= SS Melika =

History
- Port of registry: Liberia

General characteristics
- Type: Cargo ship
- Tonnage: 20,551 GRT

SS Melika was a Liberian-registered 20,551 GRT cargo vessel, which was involved in a collision with the French-registered 10,715 GRT Fernand Gilabert off the coast of Oman on 13 September 1958, causing a major maritime disaster. Fire broke out on both ships and there were 21 fatalities. Melika was abandoned but, as her engines were not stopped, she proceeded under her own power on auto-pilot for 20 miles (32 km) before being sighted by aircraft. A salvage party from HMS Puma then went on board. Subsequently, HMS Bulwark towed Melika to Muscat, where 20,000 tons of her cargo was discharged into a Royal Fleet Auxiliary tanker.

845 Naval Air Squadron Fleet Air Arm were awarded the Boyd Trophy for their participation in the salvage of Melika.
