= HMS Bulwark (R08) =

1954 Centaur-class light fleet carrier of the Royal Navy

- HMS Bulwark

History

United Kingdom
- Name: HMS Bulwark
- Ordered: 17 April 1943
- Builder: Harland & Wolff
- Laid down: 10 May 1945
- Launched: 22 June 1948
- Commissioned: 4 November 1954
- Decommissioned: April 1981
- In service: 1954–1958; 1960–1969; 1970 – April 1981
- Home port: HMNB Portsmouth
- Identification: Pennant number: R08
- Motto: "Under thy wings I will trust"
- Nickname(s): The Rusty B
- Honours and awards: Operation Musketeer
- Fate: Scrapped 1984

General characteristics
- Class & type: Centaur-class light aircraft carrier
- Displacement: 22,000 tons standard, 27,000 tons full load
- Length: 737.75 ft (224.87 m)
- Beam: 123 ft (37 m)
- Draught: 27.8 ft (8.5 m)
- Propulsion: 4 boilers, 2 shafts
- Speed: 28 knots (52 km/h; 32 mph)
- Range: 7,000 nautical miles (13,000 km; 8,100 mi) at 18 knots (33 km/h; 21 mph)
- Complement: 850 (+ 200 Naval Air Squadron + 800 Royal Marines Commando)
- Aircraft carried: As a commando carrier: 16 Wessex V helicopters of 845 or 848 Naval Air Squadron

The sixth HMS Bulwark of the Royal Navy was a 22,000 ton Centaur-class light fleet aircraft carrier. Initially commissioned as a light aircraft carrier in 1954, the ship was converted into a commando carrier in 1958 and recommissioned as such in 1960. Bulwark remained in this capacity until 1979 following failed efforts to sell the ship, Bulwark re-entered service as an anti-submarine warfare carrier and remained as such until being decommissioned in 1981. The ship was scrapped in 1984.

== Construction and career ==
Bulwark was laid down by the Harland & Wolff shipyard in Belfast on 10 May 1945. She was launched on 22 June 1948, but was not commissioned into the Royal Navy until 4 November 1954.

=== 1950s ===
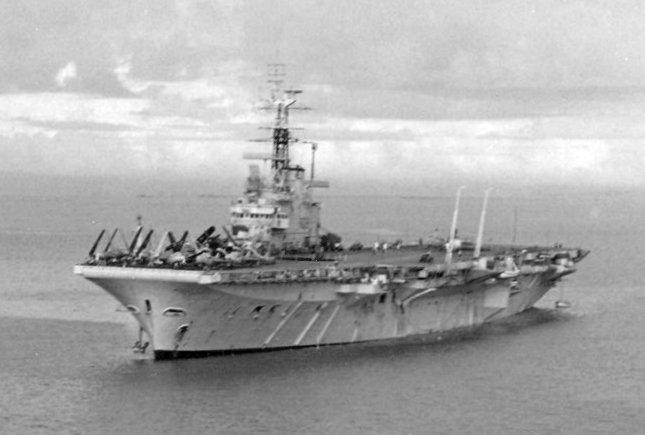
Bulwark at Singapore during the SEATO exercise "Ocean Link", 1958.

In 1956, Bulwark took part in her first combat operation, during the Suez Crisis, when she launched up to 600 sorties during Operation Musketeer. On 13 September 1958, Bulwark was exercising with the frigate Loch Killisport in the Gulf of Oman when the tankers SS Melika and Fernand Gilabe collided in the Persian Gulf and caught fire, the tankers' crews abandoning ship. Bulwark went to the aid of the two blazing tankers, with her helicopters landing fire fighting parties onto the tankers. Bulwark, with the aid of the frigate Puma, towed Melika, to Muscat. Bulwark's Whirlwind helicopter squadron, 845 Naval Air Squadron, was awarded the Boyd Trophy for the squadron's role in the rescue.

The final fixed wing complement, as embarked in 1957 (the Gannet squadron was dropped in 1958), was as follows:

- 801 Naval Air Squadron - 8 Sea Hawk FGA6 fighter-attack
- 898 Naval Air Squadron – 8 Sea Hawk FGA6 fighter-attack
- 891 Naval Air Squadron – 8 Sea Venom FAW21 night/all-weather fighter
- 820 Naval Air Squadron – 6 Gannet AS4 anti-submarine warfare
- 849 Naval Air Squadron – D flt. 4 Skyraider AEW1 airborne early warning
- 845 Naval Air Squadron – 5 Whirlwind HAS7 helicopter anti-submarine warfare
- Ships Flight 1 Dragonfly HR5 helicopter search and rescue

In 1958 she paid off at Portsmouth for conversion into a commando carrier. Her sister ship, Albion, did likewise in 1961.

=== 1960s ===
In 1960, Bulwark was recommissioned with 42 Commando Royal Marines and 848 Squadron attached to the carrier. In 1961, due to an increasing threat of invasion of Kuwait by Iraq, Bulwark landed 42 Commando in Kuwait. In the same year, she became the first Royal Navy warship since the Second World War to commission outside the UK, commissioning instead in Singapore. She also took part in the campaign against Indonesia, during the Indonesian Confrontation. In June 1966 she carried out sea trials with the Kestrel: the forerunner of the Harrier fighter aircraft made famous during the Falklands War.

In 1967, she again commissioned in Singapore Naval Dockyard (HMS Sembawang), and following her work up, proceeded to Aden to cover the withdrawal and relieve Albion. By this time, Bulwark's nickname "The Rusty B" had become firmly established.

In 1968, after service in the Arctic with 45 Commando embarked for Exercise Polar Express, the ship spent some time in dry dock in Portsmouth Dockyard for a refit. For the duration of the refit, the ship's company was accommodated in Centaur.

In Spring 1969, with commanding officer Captain J.A. Templeton-Cotill (who would later become a rear admiral and Flag Officer Malta), Bulwark left for the Mediterranean Sea and Exercise Olympic Express in the Aegean, with visits to Gibraltar, Malta, Cyprus, Salonica, Venice, Villefranche, and Toulon. For the later part of this voyage, a TV crew embarked to shoot a documentary 'Captain R.N.'. She returned to Devonport Dockyard to decommission in August 1969 for a four-month refit.

=== 1970s and 1980s ===
In January 1970, Bulwark recommissioned and sailed to Singapore via Gibraltar, Cape Town, Gan, and Brunei. After a minor refit in Singapore Naval Dockyard (to repair damage sustained in Tropical Storm Diane after leaving Cape Town), the ship sailed for Kobe, Japan (EXPO 70), Hong Kong, Jakarta and Perth Australia before returning to Plymouth.

The ship visited Liverpool from 1 July to 7 July 1971.

In September 1971 Bulwark took part in exercises in the eastern Mediterranean with 845 Squadron embarked. Whilst at anchor off Trieste she suffered a boiler room fire, in 'B' boiler room, and limped home on one set of boilers. The repairs were started in Plymouth by the dockyard but were then completed in Malta by the ships own company while involved in Operation Exit between January and end of March 1972.

In 1972, Bulwark, like her sister ship Albion, was involved in withdrawals across the declining empire. In 1972 she was headquarters ship for Operation Exit, the withdrawal from Malta, an emotional withdrawal for the Royal Navy. Bulwark lay in Grand Harbor for 11 weeks and flew more than 1,000 missions.

Later in 1972 she took part in exercises in the Caribbean Sea and visited Florida with 845 Squadron embarked. On the return journey, Bulwark had to discharge all remaining aviation fuel and transfer on to accompanying Royal Fleet Auxiliaries all ammunition to prepare to move in to dry dock after entering Plymouth. The spell in dry dock was extended due to dock yard strikes and she did not sail again until October.

In the January 1973 Bulwark sailed for exercises in the Caribbean Sea and suffered damage due to heavy storms during the 10-day crossing of the Atlantic. The first port of call was a 10-day visit to Charleston, South Carolina, which meant sailing under the Cooper Bridge. Bulwark became the largest warship to have sailed under that bridge. The following day brought a snow storm, the worst in this area for more than 80 years, which did not stop for about eight days. After the visit came the exercises in the Caribbean, with visits in between to Viaques and Puerto Rico.

Under the command of Captain Derek Bazalgette, she saw service in the Mediterranean in 1973 visiting Malta, Piraeus, Istanbul, Gibraltar and, in December 1973, Travemünde, the port of Lübeck. Owing to a delayed start date for refit, she embarked a company of Netherlands Marine Corps and spent early 1974 in the Dutch Caribbean, also visiting Cartagena, Colombia; she suffered damage during the storms of January 1974 in the eastern Atlantic. The 1974 refit was undertaken in Devonport Dockyard, during which time command transferred to Captain Johnnie R C Johnston. In 1975 she returned to the Mediterranean, visiting Gibraltar, Villefranche and Malta before returning to her home port of Plymouth in July.

In March 1976, Bulwark was withdrawn from service and placed in Reserve. Also during this year the Ministry of Defence offered Bulwark to the Peruvian Navy. After two years of negotiations finally the Royal Navy decided to keep the ship. Furthermore, she underwent a refit at Portsmouth in 1978, and was recommissioned as an anti-submarine warfare carrier on 23 February 1979, due to delays with the new aircraft carrier Invincible.

On 28 June 1979, Bulwark was involved in exercise Whiskey Venture, with 820 Squadron (flying Sea Kings) and 45 Royal Marine Commando embarked. Also during 1979, Bulwark was involved in trials of the Sea Harrier. At the start of 1980, Bulwark visited the United States of America; participating in Exercise Safe Passage off the east coast of the United States in late February. On 15 March, while alongside in Philadelphia, a fire destroyed one boiler, which could not be repaired to operational status. The carrier returned to Portsmouth on 2 April, and on 15 April embarked 45 Commando for Exercise Dawn Patrol off Sardinia. In August, Bulwark was involved in Exercise Teamwork 80 off Norway. On 9 November, a major fire damaged the forward hangar and some messdecks. Minimal repairs were performed to both areas in order for her to stay in service until HMS Invincible was commissioned in the spring of 1981.

== Decommissioning and fate ==
On 27 March 1981, Bulwark returned to Portsmouth for the final time. She was decommissioned into unmaintained reserve without any repairs being attempted to the damaged boiler or other fire damage. The carrier would however, remain intact for the next two years. During the early stages of the Falklands War it was announced that Bulwark would be reactivated and sent south to support the fleet, and then remain as a headquarters hulk at Port Stanley following the war. A rapid ship survey, however, determined that in addition to the only minimally repaired fire damage suffered in 1980, her machinery and structure had deteriorated such that it would have taken as much as eight months and a significant amount of funds to get her minimally seaworthy.

She was finally declared for disposal in April 1983 and some material was removed as potential spares for Hermes. She remained anchored in harbour until she was towed from Portsmouth to Cairnryan to be scrapped in April 1984.

== Bibliography ==
- Hobbs, David (1996). Aircraft Carriers of the Royal and Commonwealth Navies: The Complete Illustrated Encyclopedia from World War I to the Present. London: Greenhill Books. ISBN 1-85367-252-1.
