= 846 Naval Air Squadron =

Flying squadron of the Royal Navy's Fleet Air Arm

- Squadron badge
- Active: 1943–1945; 1962–1964; 1968–1975; 1976–1977; 1978–2013; 2014–present
- Country: United Kingdom
- Branch: Royal Navy
- Type: Commando Helicopter Force medium-lift squadron
- Role: Royal Marines: Tactical airlift; amphibious assault; Merlin HC4/4A pilot and aircrew training
- Part of: Fleet Air Arm; Joint Aviation Command; Commando Helicopter Force
- Home station: RNAS Yeovilton
- Nickname: 'Junglies'
- Motto: Semper instans (Latin for 'Always threatening')
- Aircraft: AgustaWestland Merlin MK4
- Decorations: Boyd Trophy 1963, 1984
- Website: Official website

Commanders
- Current commander: Commander Nicholas Charlesworth

Insignia
- Squadron Badge Description: Blue over water barry wavy of six white and blue, a man proper helmeted red holding in the sinister hand a sword gold and mounted on a Pegasus white attacking a sea serpent proper langued red (1944)
- Identification Markings: 4A+ (Avenger); JA+ (Avenger on Trumpeter September 1944); single letters (Wildcat); J:A (Wildcat September 1944); single letters (Whirlwind); single letters (Wessex); XA+ (Wessex June 1971); V plus individual letters S,Q,U,A,D,R,O,N (Wessex); then P,O,L,A,R,C,U,B,S (October 1978); VA+ (Sea King December 1979); single letter B-Z (Merlin)
- Fin Carrier/Shore Codes: A (Whirlwind); CU (Wessex); CU:VL:B:H (Wessex June 1971); VL (Sea King December 1979, later no fin code)

846 Naval Air Squadron (846 NAS), sometimes referred to as 846 Squadron, is a Fleet Air Arm (FAA) naval air squadron of the United Kingdom’s Royal Navy (RN). The squadron represents one of the two primary AgustaWestland Merlin HC4 Squadrons that constitute the Royal Navy's Commando Helicopter Force, having operated this variant since 2019.

The squadron was active in the later years of the Second World War, utilising the Grumman Avenger. During the early sixties, it flew the Westland Whirlwind, providing support for Royal Marines deployments abroad. It transitioned to the Westland Wessex using these between 1968 and 1981. Between December 1979 and the summer of 2013, 846 Squadron operated the Westland Sea King HC4 helicopter to provide troop transport and load lifting support to 3 Commando Brigade Royal Marines, notably during the Falklands conflict, the Gulf War, operations in the Adriatic and former Yugoslavia, Iraq and Afghanistan. Based at RNAS Yeovilton in Somerset, 846 NAS stood down in the summer of 2013 and its personnel, buildings and equipment were amalgamated into 845 Naval Air Squadron.

The squadron stood up on 30 September 2014 with the AgustaWestland Merlin HC3 and it now holds the Operational Conversion Flight and Maritime Counter Terrorism Role.

== History ==
=== Second World War ===
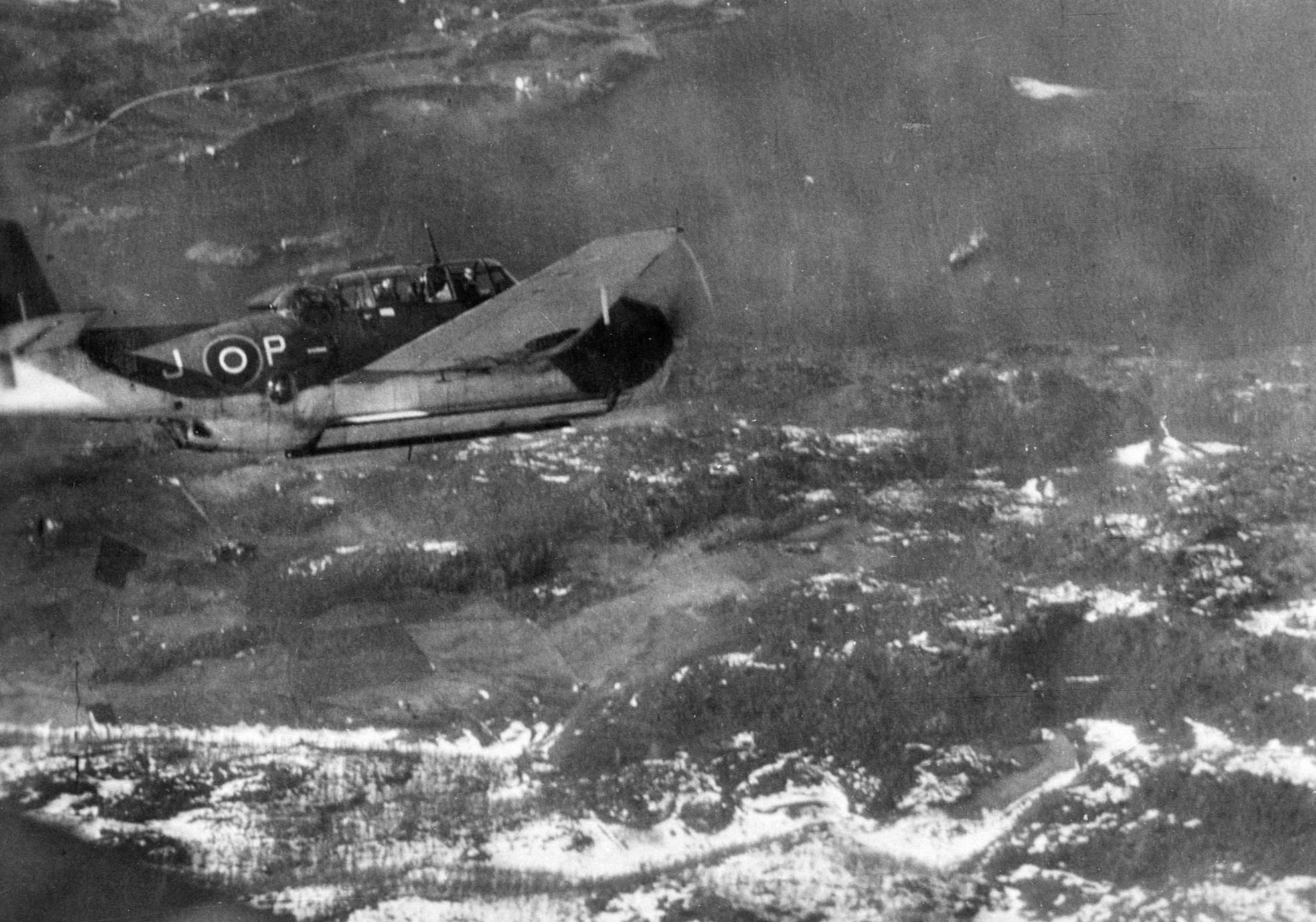
An 846 NAS Grumman Avenger from HMS Trumpeter in flight, 1944–45.

846 Naval Air Squadron was established in April 1943 at RNAS Quonset Point (HMS Saker II) located at Naval Air Station Quonset Point, Rhode Island, United States which had been loaned to the Admiralty from October 1942. It was equipped with twelve Grumman Avenger I, an American torpedo bomber aircraft. The squadron moved to RN Air Section Norfolk the following month, located at Naval Air Station Norfolk, Virginia, where lodger facilities for FAA squadrons and an Air Section were granted to the Admiralty.

Two months later the unit embarked on the Attacker-class escort carrier HMS Ravager when on 2 July, the twelve Grumman Avengers of 846 Squadron embarked to provide convoy protection during the carrier's inaugural Atlantic crossing. The vessel joined the UK-bound convoy HX.248 and on 27 July, 846 Squadron departed the carrier to the UK.

Before being assigned to sister ship HMS Tracker in January 1944, four Grumman Wildcat Mk V fighter aircraft from 1832 Squadron were added to 846 Squadron. HMS Tracker was first assigned to convoys going to Gibraltar, then to Murmansk. On the latter voyage, aircraft from 846 attacked eight German U-boats, leading to the sinking of the Kriegsmarine submarines U-355 and U-288.

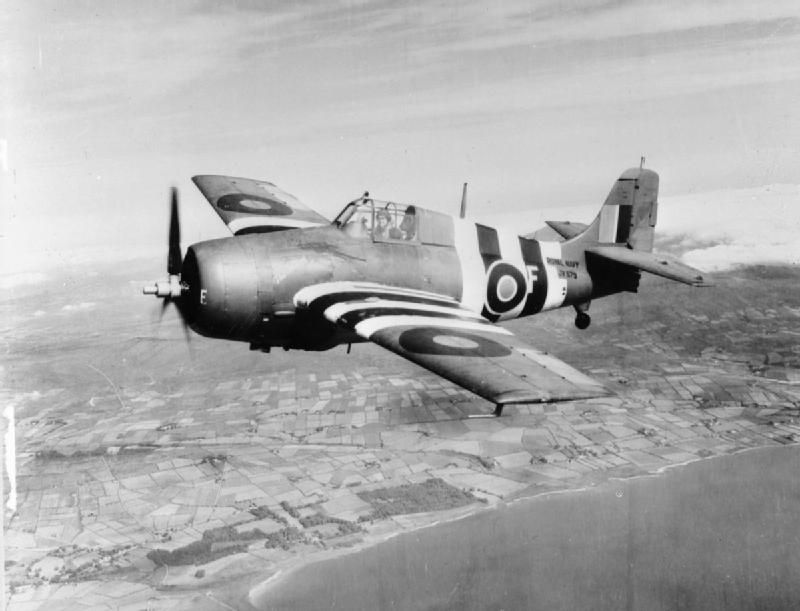
A Grumman Wildcat of 846 Squadron displaying invasion stripes

HMS Tracker was damaged in June 1944 in a collision with the Royal Canadian Navy's frigate HMCS Teme while forming part of the naval screen for the D-Day landings, and the squadron disembarked to RAF Limavady airfield, Northern Ireland, joining 15 Group, RAF Coastal Command. A month later 846 NAS was assigned to HMS Trumpeter, mainly laying mines off Norway until September 1944.

In December a detachment of five Grumman Avengers was formed and transferred to the Ruler-class escort carrier HMS Premier for a few days. The remainder of 846 NAS operated from HMS Trumpeter or RNAS Hatston in Orkney up to May 1945. On 4 May 1945, twelve Avenger and four Wildcat aircraft of the squadron took part in Operation Judgement, the last air-raid of the war in Europe. The fighter flight was disbanded after the end of hostilities in Europe.

846 NAS was then assigned to the 4th Carrier Air Group and should have deployed to the Far East aboard the fleet carrier HMS Illustrious. However, a change of plans led to the squadron becoming a trials unit. It was renumbered 751 NAS and was disbanded at RNAS Machrihanish (HMS Landrail), Argyll and Bute, in September 1945.

=== Borneo ===
846 NAS was reformed in 1962 as a Commando squadron equipped with the Westland Whirlwind HAS.7. It was deployed to Borneo aboard the commando carrier HMS Albion and flew in support of actions against guerrillas during the Indonesia–Malaysia confrontation. British Army units gave 846 NAS the nickname 'Junglies' in Borneo, which the squadron has kept until today.

=== Wessex (1968-1981) ===
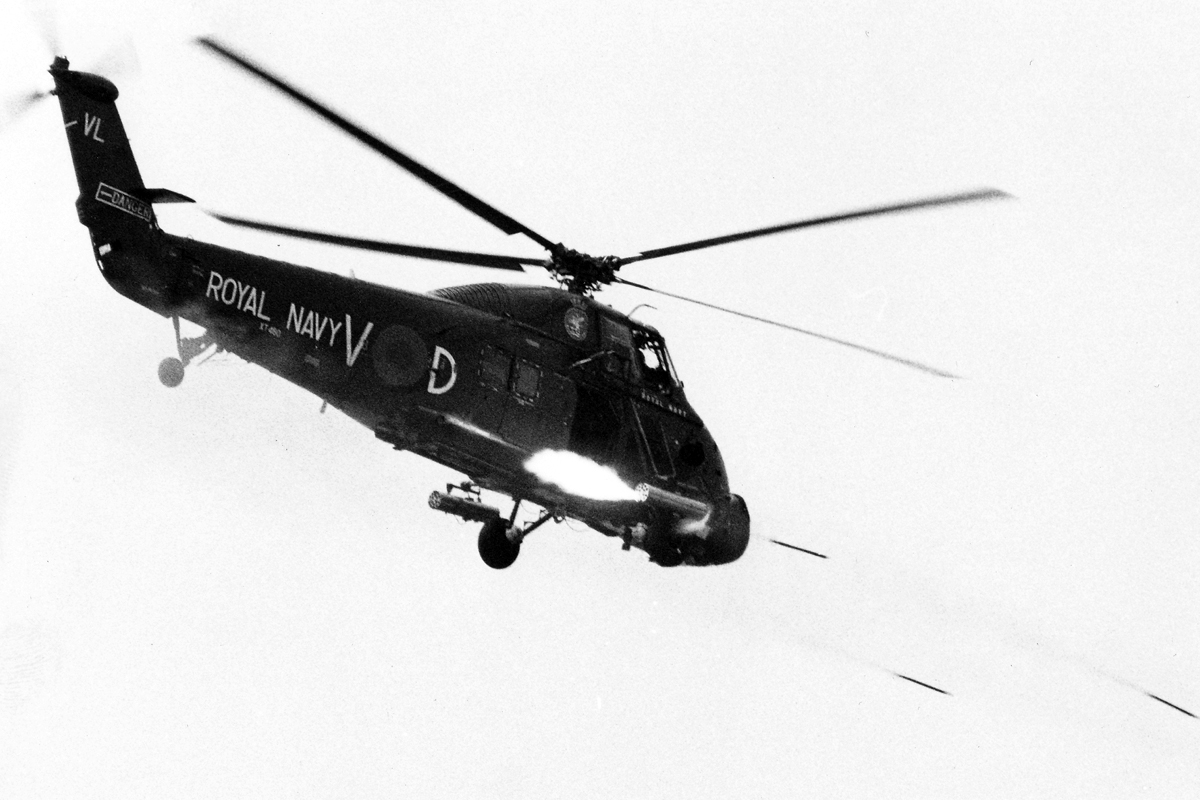
Westland Wessex HU.5, 846 Squadron

The Westland Wessex HU.5 was developed to fulfil the operational needs of the Royal Marine Commandos, providing a helicopter capable of transporting twelve or more fully-armed combat personnel into action from the deck of an aircraft carrier or commando carrier to commence an assault on an enemy beachhead. Additionally, the Wessex HU.5 possessed the ability to target ground installations using wire-guided air-to-surface missiles or to function as a 'gunship'. Artillery, Land Rovers, or large quantities of fuel and ammunition could similarly be suspended beneath the aircraft and dropped from a hovering position.

In July 1968, 846 was reformed at RNAS Culdrose (HMS Seahawk), Cornwall, as the Commando headquarters and trials squadron, equipped with four Wessex HU.5 helicopters. During the Gibraltar discussions regarding the future of Rhodesia, it embarked on the name ship of her class the dock-landing ship HMS Fearless in October. Subsequently, in February 1969, the squadron travelled to Norway aboard the helicopter support ship RFA Engadine for cold weather trials, with similar detachments dispatched in the following two winters. In February 1972, four aircraft were stationed on the Centaur-class light aircraft carrier converted into a commando carrier HMS Bulwark amid the British withdrawal from Malta, and in May, 846 relocated to RNAS Yeovilton (HMS Heron), Somerset. The squadron assumed responsibility for the three aircraft in the ammunition, explosives and stores supply ship RFA Regent, the armament stores ship RFA Resource and the Tide-class replenishment oiler RFA Tidespring, transferring the remaining Flights, personnel, and duties to 707 Squadron when 846 disbanded at RNAS Yeovilton in December 1975.

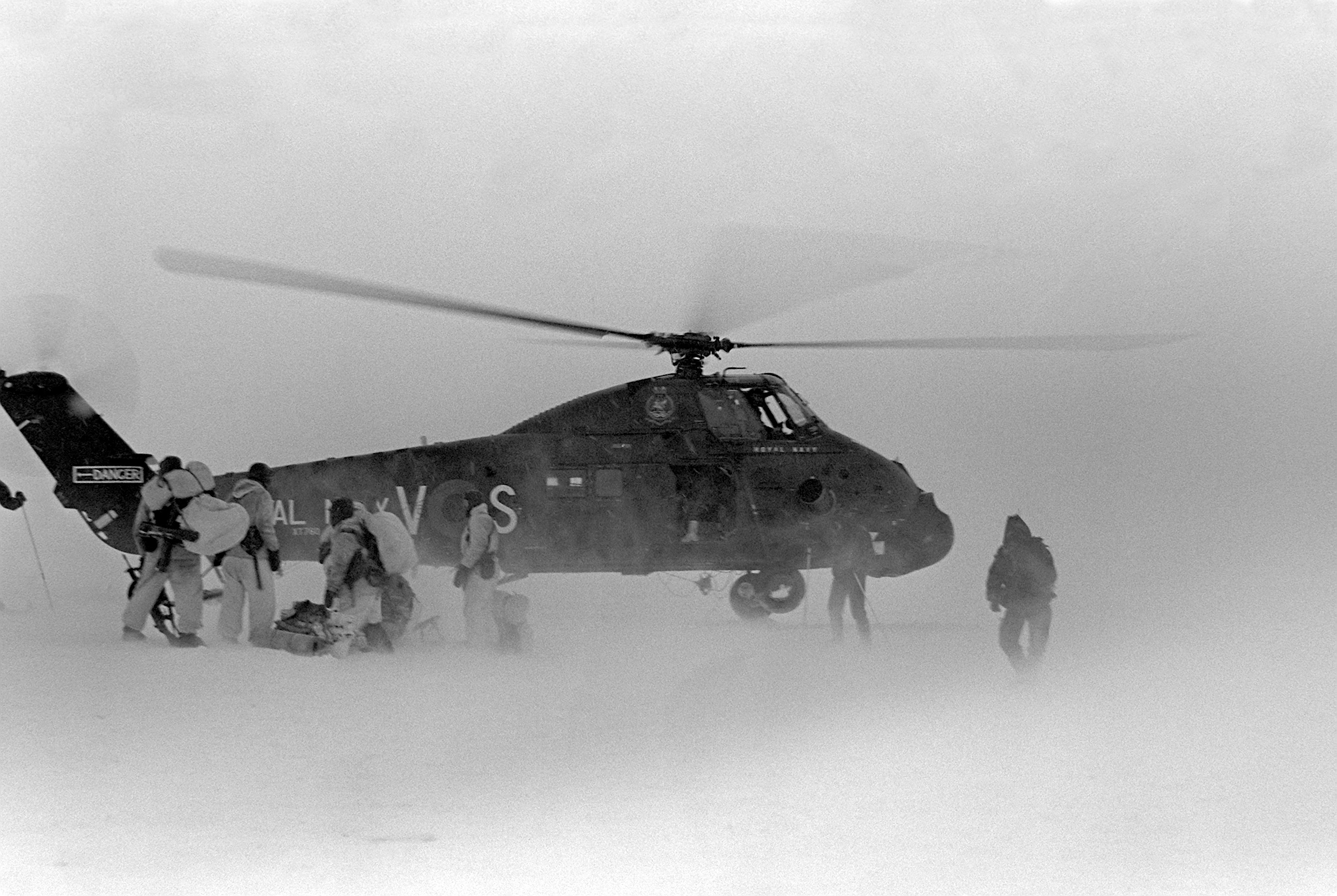
Westland Wessex HU.5 of 846 Squadron during a joint forces cold weather airlift exercise on 1 February 1981

In April 1976, 846 Squadron was reformed at RNAS Yeovilton from the remnants of a disbanded 848 Squadron, establishing itself as a Commando squadron equipped with eight Wessex HU.5 helicopters. Throughout the year, various detachments occurred, including the deployment of four helicopters to the Mediterranean aboard HMS Fearless in October. Early in 1977, helicopters were sent to northern Norway for exercises, with the squadron being embarked on two Round Table-class landing ship logistics vessels, RFA Sir Galahad and RFA Sir Tristram, before joining the Centaur-class light fleet carrier HMS Hermes in June for two exercises. The squadron ceased to function as an independent entity in September 1977 when it was merged with 845 Squadron at RNAS Yeovilton.

In October 1978, 846 was reformed at RNAS Yeovilton as a Commando squadron, equipped with twelve Wessex HU.5 helicopters. In January 1979, it was assigned to HMS Hermes; however, the subsequent month saw the first of several detachments being deployed aboard HMS Bulwark. The squadron ultimately re-joined HMS Hermes in June, but was soon re-assigned to HMS Bulwark, where it commenced a gradual transition to Sea King HC.4 helicopters in December. In April 1980, the entire squadron embarked on HMS Bulwark for a training exercise, and in September, a portion of the squadron travelled to northern Norway for another exercise, followed by a visit to Hamburg. Additional visits to northern Norway occurred in early 1981, and to Denmark in September, with the final Wessex HU.5 departing in October.

=== Sea King (1979-2013) ===
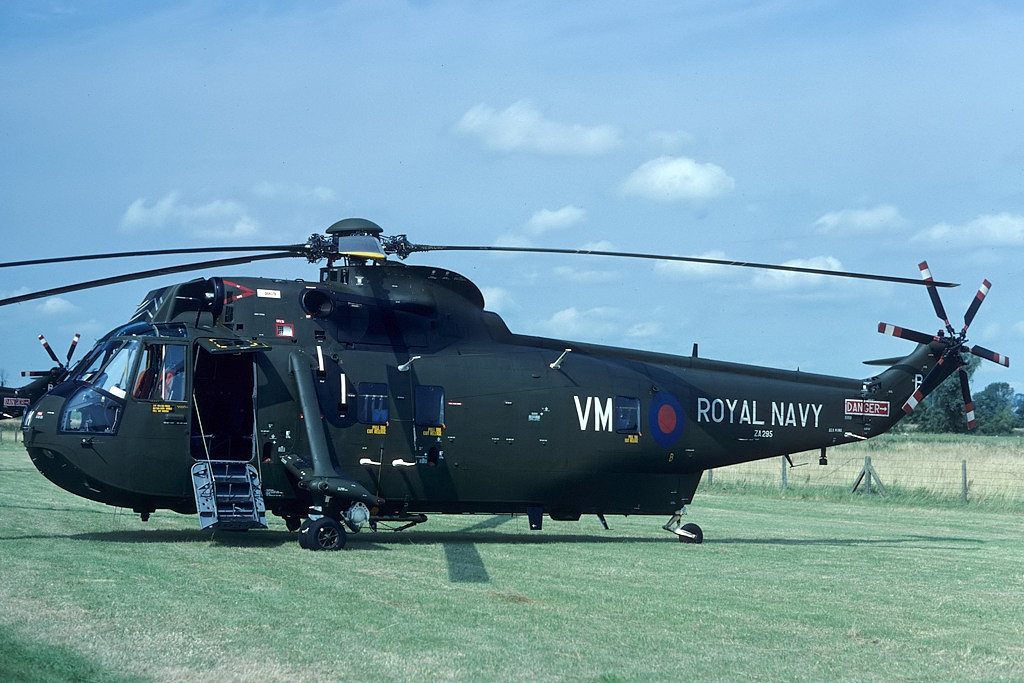
Westland Sea King HC.4, of 846 Squadron

Beginning in November 1979, a new iteration of the Westland Sea King, designated the HC.4, was introduced into service with the Fleet Air Arm. Configured as a troop transport and logistical support aircraft, the Sea King HC.4 conducted its inaugural flight at RNAS Yeovilton on 26 September 1979. Primarily designed to replace the Wessex HU.5 as the principal lift helicopter for the Royal Marines, the Sea King H.C.4 had a lifting capacity of 8,000 lb, significantly surpassing the 2,700 lb capacity of its predecessor. The Sea King H.C.4 was designed to accommodate twenty-seven fully equipped Royal Marine commandos or other personnel and was capable of operating in both arctic and tropical environments.

==== Falklands War (1982) ====
In April 1982, 846 NAS embarked aboard the carrier HMS Hermes as part of the Royal Navy task force in the Falklands War. During the war 846 NAS Sea King's flew over 2800 hours, completed 10,000 individual troop moves and transported more than 81,600 t of freight. Throughout a significant campaign, the squadron provided support to ground troops and participated in various covert operations, which included the deployment of forty-five Special Forces personnel on Pebble Island on 14 May. There, they successfully destroyed or severely damaged eleven Argentine aircraft, while one helicopter undertook a one-way mission that concluded in Chile. During the campaign, thirteen Sea King H.C.4s from 846 Squadron played a crucial role during the landings at San Carlos and conducted night operations alongside the Special Boat Service (SBS) and the Special Air Service (SAS).

In 1983, detachments were deployed aboard the carriers HMS Hermes and HMS Invincible. Between November 1983 and March 1984, a detachment of three Sea Kings was deployed aboard HMS Fearless and RFA Reliant to the coast of Lebanon supporting British troops involved in peacekeeping operations in Lebanon during the Lebanese Civil War and took part in the eventual withdrawal of British troops and the evacuation of civilians from Beirut, airlifting 521 civilians on 10 March 1994. The squadron was awarded the Boyd Trophy for these operations.

==== Gulf War ====
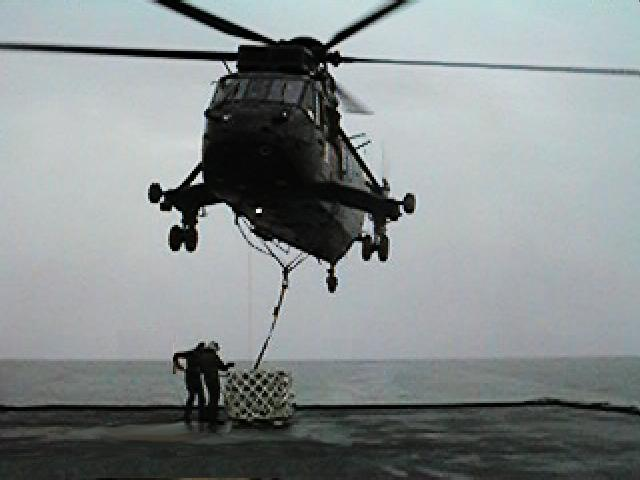
A Sea King of 846 NAS lifting load during exercise "Ocean Wave '97".

The squadron was stationed in the Persian Gulf on RFA Fort Grange, RFA Olna, and RFA Argus during the Gulf War from October 1990 to April 1991. Upon their return, they were promptly redeployed, this time to Silopi in southern Turkey, to provide support for UN assistance to the Kurds in northern Iraq, before returning to the UK in June 1991. An element of 846 NAS also remained in theatre post Gulf War to assist with mine clearance operations, alongside an element from 845 NAS. These aircraft were then deployed to Bangladesh aboard RFA Fort Grange to assist with the relief effort after the 1991 Bangladesh cyclone as part of Operation Manna.

==== Yugoslav Wars ====
In January 1993, 846 NAS was deployed until March aboard the carrier HMS Ark Royal to the Adriatic as part of UN operations in Yugoslavia. Shortly after returning to the UK the squadron was deployed to Northern Ireland to replace 707 NAS to provide support to security forces. It returned to the Balkans to provide air support for Multi-National Division-SW (SFOR), which was then commanded by the British, in Bosnia. This deployment lasted until 2002.

==== Afghanistan ====
Since 2007, the 10 Sea King HC4/HC3i helicopters of 846 NAS were committed to the Kandahar and Helmand provinces in Afghanistan in support of 3 Commando Brigade Royal Marines.

=== Merlin (2014-present) ===
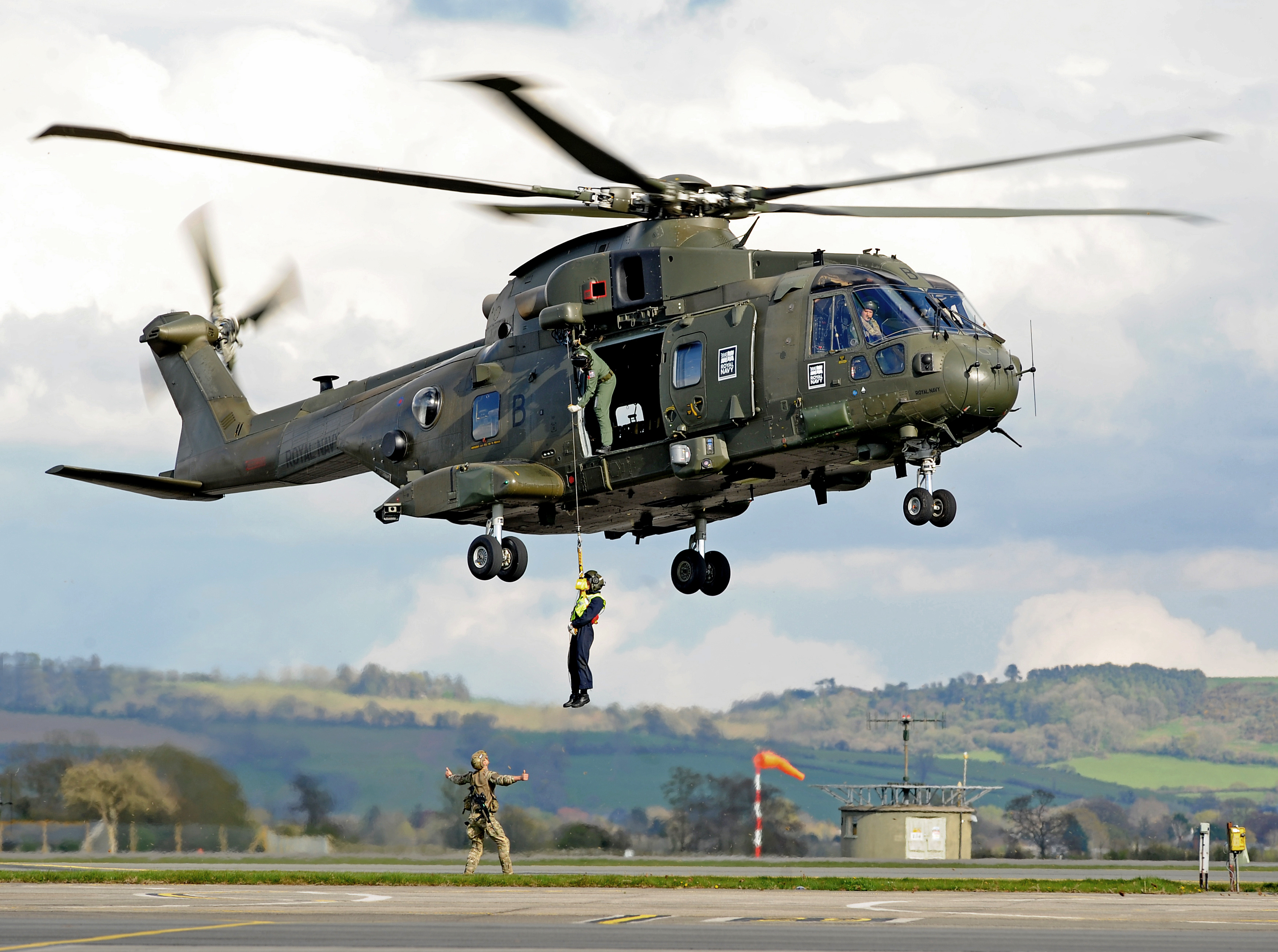
A Merlin MK3 previously operated by 846 NAS.

846 NAS re-equipped with the AgustaWestland Merlin MK3 on 30 September 2014 at RAF Benson. The squadron moved back to its usual home of RNAS Yeovilton in March 2015. As of 12 March 2019 846 NAS had received the first of its Merlin MK4 helicopters.

== Affiliations ==
- Sherborne School CCF
- King's School, Bruton CCF
- Cardiff URNU
- 1st Battalion, Argyll and Sutherland Highlanders
- 751 Squadron, Portuguese Air Force

== Aircraft operated ==
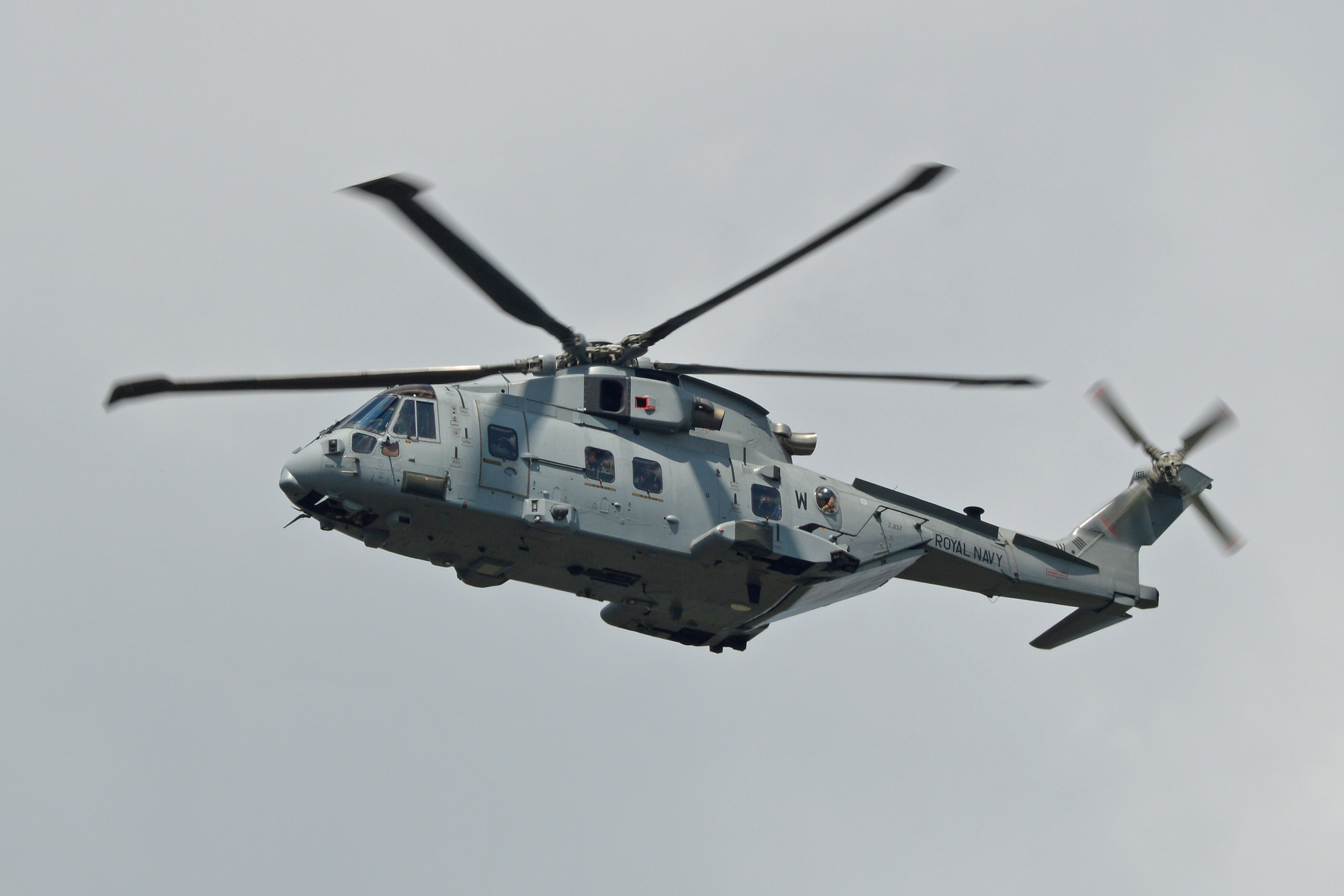
Merlin HC4

The squadron operated a variety of different aircraft and versions:

- Grumman Avenger Mk.I torpedo bomber (April 1943 - June 1945)
- Grumman Wildcat Mk V fighter aircraft (December 1943 - September 1944)
- Grumman Avenger Mk.II torpedo bomber (June - September 1945)
- Grumman Wildcat Mk VI fighter aircraft (September 1944 - May 1945)
- Westland Whirlwind HAS.7 anti-submarine warfare (ASW) helicopter (May 1962 - October 1964)
- Westland Wessex HU.5 troop transporter helicopter (July 1968 - December 1975, April 1976 - September 1977, October 1978 - October 1981)
- Westland Sea King HC.4/Westland Commando commando assault and utility transport helicopter (December 1979 - January 2013)
- AgustaWestland A109A Hirondu utility helicopter (June - July 1982)
- Westland Sea King HAS.6(CR) ASW helicopter converted into the utility role (March 2004 - March 2010)
- AgustaWestland Merlin HC3 transport helicopter (October 2014 - December 2022)
- AgustaWestland Merlin HC4 transport helicopter (March 2019 - present)

== Battle honours ==
The following Battle Honours have been awarded to 846 Naval Air Squadron:

- Atlantic 1944
- Arctic 1944–45
- Norway 1944–45
- Normandy 1944
- Falklands 1982
- Kuwait 1991

== Commanding officers ==
List of commanding officers of 846 Naval Air Squadron:

1943 - 1945

- Lieutenant Commander(A) R.D. Head, DSC, RN, from 1 March 1943
- Lieutenant Commander C.L.F. Webb, RN, from 7 October 1944
- Lieutenant Commander J.S.L. Crabbe, RN, from 9 May 1945
- Lieutenant Commander(A) D.J. Bunyan, RNVR, from 16 June 1945
- disbanded - 22 September 1945

1962 - 1964

- Lieutenant Commander D.F. Burke, DSC, RN, from 8 May 1962
- Lieutenant Commander J.H. Stuart-Jervis, RN, from 7 April 1964
- disbanded - 19 October 1964

1968 - 1975

- Lieutenant Commander D.J. Lickfold, MBE, RN, from 29 July 1968
- Lieutenant Commander B.C. Sarginson, MBE, RN, from 3 November 1969
- Lieutenant Commander N.S. Foster, RN, from 1 September 1970
- Lieutenant Commander J.S. Kelly, MBE, RN, from 6 March 1972 (Commander 30 June 1972)
- Lieutenant Commander J.J.D. Knapp, RN, from 30 July 1973
- Lieutenant Commander B.G. Skinner, RN, from 12 February 1975 (Commander 30 June 1975)
- disbanded - 17 December 1975

1976 - 1977

- Lieutenant Commander J.J.D. Knapp, RN, from 1 April 1976
- Lieutenant Commander D.A. Goodenough-Bayly, RN, from 14 October 1976
- disbanded - 5 September 1977

1978 - 2013

- Lieutenant Commander R.P. Seymour, AFC, RN, from 4 September 1978
- Lieutenant Commander T.J. Yarker, RN, from 5 June 1980
- Lieutenant Commander S.C. Thornewill, DSC, RN, from 15 December 1981
- Lieutenant Commander N. McMillan, RN, from 29 October 1982
- Lieutenant Commander N.G.T. Harris, RN, from 19 June 1984
- Lieutenant Commander J.P.K. Rooke, RN, from 4 December 1985
- Lieutenant Commander T.J. Eltringham, RN, from 22 June 1987
- Lieutenant Commander L.A. Port, MBE, RN, from 7 July 1989
- Lieutenant Commander N.J. North, DSC, RN, from 10 April 1992
- Lieutenant Commander F.W. Robertson, RN, from 15 March 1994
- Lieutenant Commander C.D. Brown, RN, from 13 September 1996
- Lieutenant Commander R.W. King, RN, from 2 October 1998
- Lieutenant Commander J.D.A. Burgess, RN, from 4 August 2000
- Lieutenant Commander N.J. Thompson, RN, from 14 January 2003 (Commander 1 April 2004)
- Commander M.V. Carretta, RN, from 26 April 2005
- Commander N.R. Griffin, MBE, RN, from 25 April 2008
- Lieutenant Colonel J.F. Roylance, RM, from 27 July 2010
- Commander R.S. Harrison, MBE, RN, from 4 June 2012
- disbanded - 31 May 2013

2014 - present

- Lieutenant Colonel D.B. Stafford, MBE, RM, from 30 September 2014
- Lieutenant Colonel W.A. Penkman, RM, from 18 July 2016

Note: Abbreviation (A) signifies Air Branch of the RN or RNVR.

== See also ==
- Falklands War order of battle: British naval forces
