= Iwan Raikes =

Royal Navy Vice-Admiral (1921-2011)

Vice-Admiral Sir Iwan Raikes KCB CBE DSC DL
- Born: 21 April 1921
- Died: 27 December 2011 (aged 90)
- Military career
- Allegiance: United Kingdom
- Branch: Royal Navy
- Service years: 1935–1977
- Rank: Vice-Admiral
- Commands: HMS H43; HMS Varne; HMS Virtue; HMS Talent; HMS Aeneas; HMS Loch Insh; HMS Kent
- Conflicts: World War II
- Awards: Knight Commander of the Order of the Bath; Commander of the Order of the British Empire; Distinguished Service Cross

Sir Iwan Geoffrey Raikes (21 April 1921 – 27 December 2011) was a former Royal Navy officer who became Naval Secretary.

== Naval career ==
Born the son of Admiral Sir Robert Raikes and educated at the Royal Naval College, Dartmouth, Raikes joined the Royal Navy in 1935 and decided to specialise in submarines. He served in World War II and commanded the submarines HMS H43 and HMS Varne.

After the War he commanded the submarines HMS Virtue, HMS Talent and HMS Aeneas and then the frigate HMS Loch Insh. He was appointed deputy director of Undersurface Warfare in 1962, Director of Plans and Operations on the staff of Commander-in-Chief, Far East in 1965 and Captain of the destroyer HMS Kent in 1968. Promoted to rear-admiral, he went on to be Naval Secretary in 1970; after being promoted to vice-admiral he became Flag Officer First Flotilla in 1973 and Flag Officer Submarines and Commander of Submarines, Eastern Atlantic Area in 1974 before retiring in January 1977.

In retirement he became Chairman of the United Usk Fishermen's Association as well as Deputy Lieutenant of Powys. He died on 27 December 2011.

== Family ==
In 1947 he married (Cecilia) Primrose Hunt; they have one son and one daughter. Lady Raikes died in 2022.

Military offices
Preceded by David Dunbar-Nasmith	Naval Secretary; 1970–1972	Succeeded by Gordon Tait
Preceded by Anthony Troup	Flag Officer Submarines; 1974–1976	Succeeded by John Fieldhouse
