= Commando Helicopter Force =

Element of the British Royal Navy and Joint Aviation Command

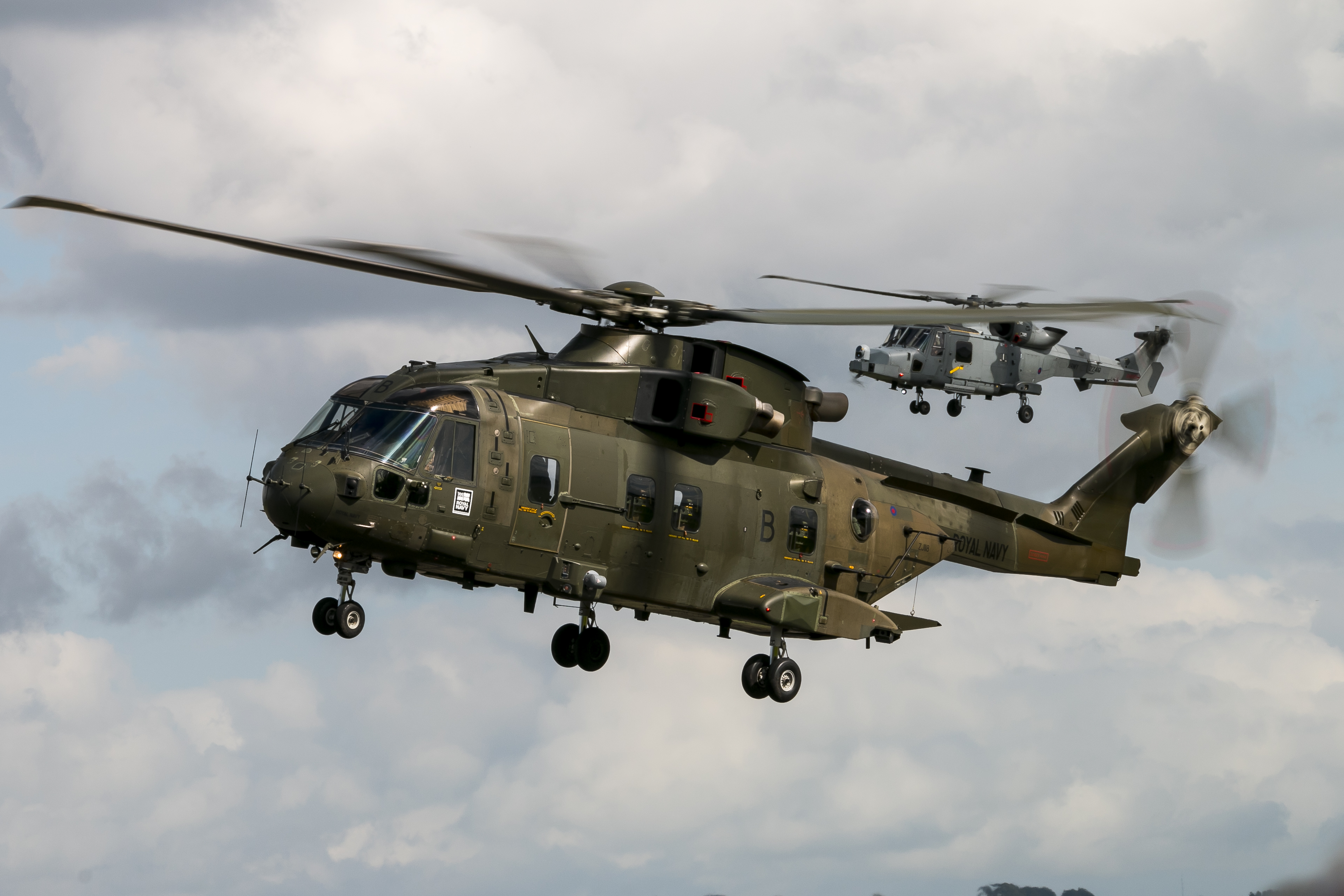
- Commando Helicopter Force Merlin HC3/3A and Wildcat AH1
- Active: 1997 – present
- Country: United Kingdom
- Branch: Royal Navy
- Type: Force headquarters
- Role: Air support to the UK Commando Force
- Size: c. 700 personnel
- Part of: Fleet Air Arm; Joint Aviation Command
- Home station: RNAS Yeovilton
- Nickname: The Junglies
- Aircraft: Merlin HC4/4A; Wildcat AH1
- Website: Official website

Commanders
- Current commander: Colonel Will Penkman Royal Marines

Commando Helicopter Force (CHF) is a unit of the Royal Navy Fleet Air Arm and an element of the Joint Aviation Command of the British Armed Forces. Its primary role is to provide helicopter support to the UK Commando Force and other UK force elements in the amphibious environment. CHF uses a combination of transport helicopters based at Royal Naval Air Station Yeovilton in Somerset, England.

Endearingly referred to as 'The Junglies' due to their activities in Borneo throughout the 1960s, the Commando Helicopter Force comprises three squadrons: 845, 846, and 847 Naval Air Squadrons. Collectively, they operate the AW-101 Merlin HC4/4A and the AW-159 Wildcat AH1 to deliver air support to the UK Commando Force and various other UK forces. Their roles encompass battlefield reconnaissance, joint fire support, and the training of aircrew and engineers for frontline operations, with expertise in maritime, Arctic, and desert environments.

== History ==
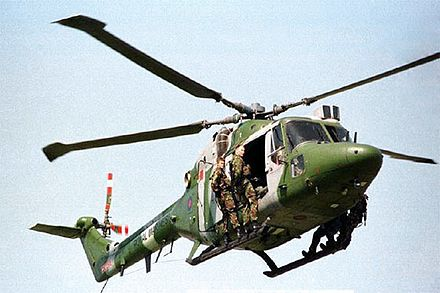
A Lynx AH7 of the type previously used by the Commando Helicopter Force

The Commando Helicopter Force was formed in 1997 to consolidate command and control of the various Fleet Air Arm and Royal Marines helicopter squadrons which supported 3 Commando Brigade under Flag Officer Naval Aviation.

In 1999, CHF merged with various Royal Air Force (RAF) and Army Air Corps force elements under the Joint Helicopter Command, whilst maintaining its identity as a formed unit.

Elements of the force have operated in Northern Ireland (until 2002), Sierra Leone in 2000 and Bosnia; and it was an element of the amphibious force for Operation Telic, the British involvement in the 2003 invasion of Iraq, notably supporting the landings to secure the Al-Faw Peninsula. CHF was also a major part of Joint Helicopter Command's contribution to Operation Herrick in Afghanistan.

Following the Strategic Defence and Security Review of 2010, the decision was made to transfer all RAF Merlin HC3 helicopters to the Royal Navy under the command and control of Commando Helicopter Force. On 30 September 2014, the aircraft were formally handed over from the RAF to the Royal Navy; with the first Royal Navy Merlin squadron, 846 Naval Air Squadron, standing up concurrently and relocating from RAF Benson to RNAS Yeovilton on 26 March 2015 and 845 Naval Air Squadron doing likewise the year after.

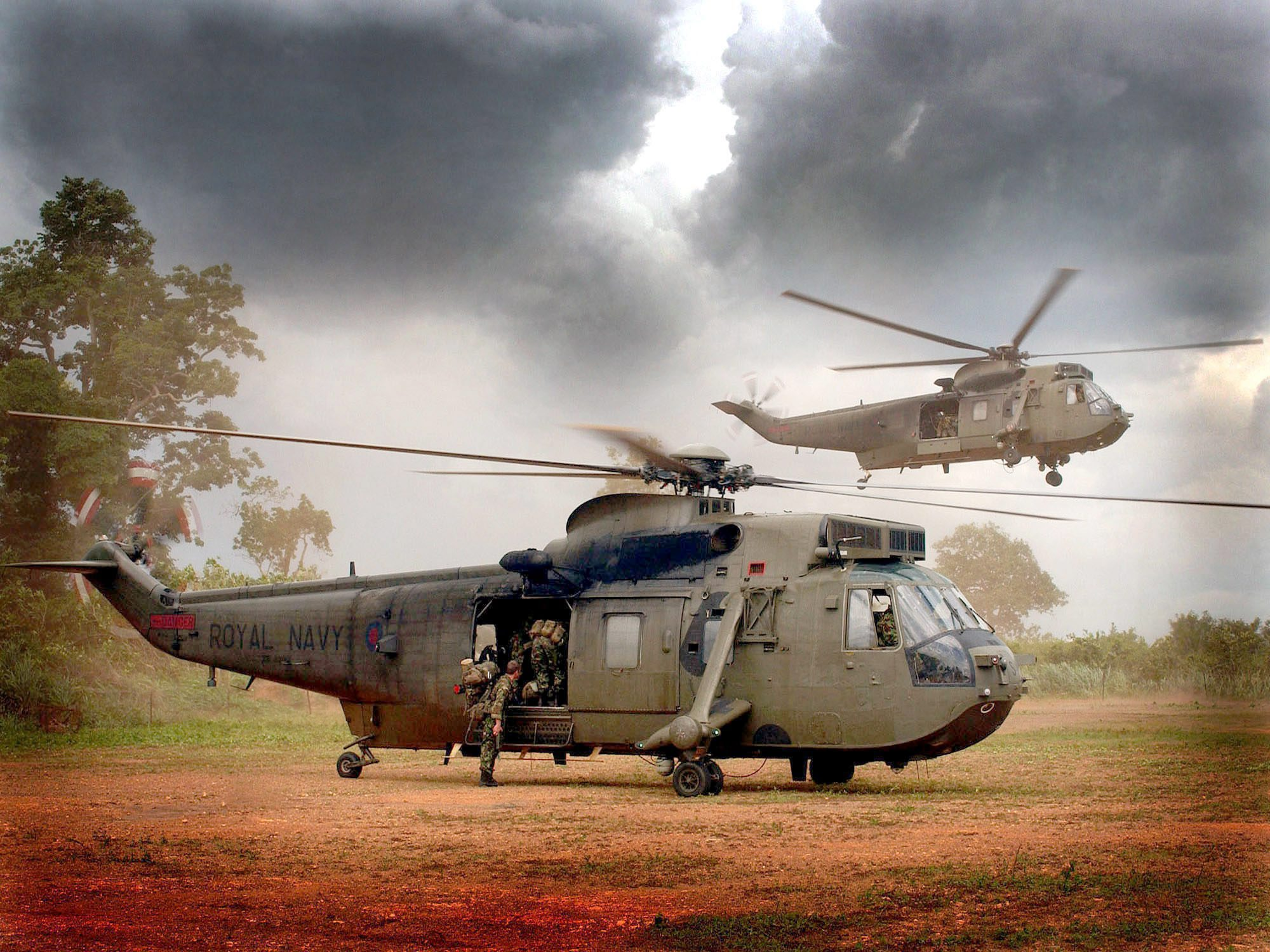
Sea King HC4 'Junglies' from 846 Naval Air Squadron insert Royal Marines into the Birrim forest Ghana during 2004

The Merlin HC3 replaced the ageing Sea King HC4 as CHF's medium-lift transport aircraft when the Sea King HC4 retired on 31 March 2016.

As part of the transfer of service, the Merlin HC3 underwent an upgrade to the HC4 standard which includes a full mid-life upgrade of the airframe and avionics; and 'marinised' or more accurately optimised the aircraft for ship-borne amphibious operations.

== Location ==
It is based at Royal Naval Air Station Yeovilton in Somerset, England; aircraft are regularly deployed with UK Commando Forces, overseas and to the ships of the Joint Expeditionary Force (Maritime) (JEF(M)).

Aircraft of the Commando Helicopter Force can be accommodated on the Queen Elizabeth class aircraft carriers as well as some vessels of the Royal Fleet Auxiliary.

== Command and control ==
CHF is a Fleet Air Arm asset and as such remains under the Full Command (FULLCOM) of the First Sea Lord, whilst Operational Command (OPCOM) is delegated to the Joint Aviation Command, under Army HQ, who will task assets in accordance with Permanent Joint Headquarters (PJHQ) or Front Line Command requirements.

== Organisation ==
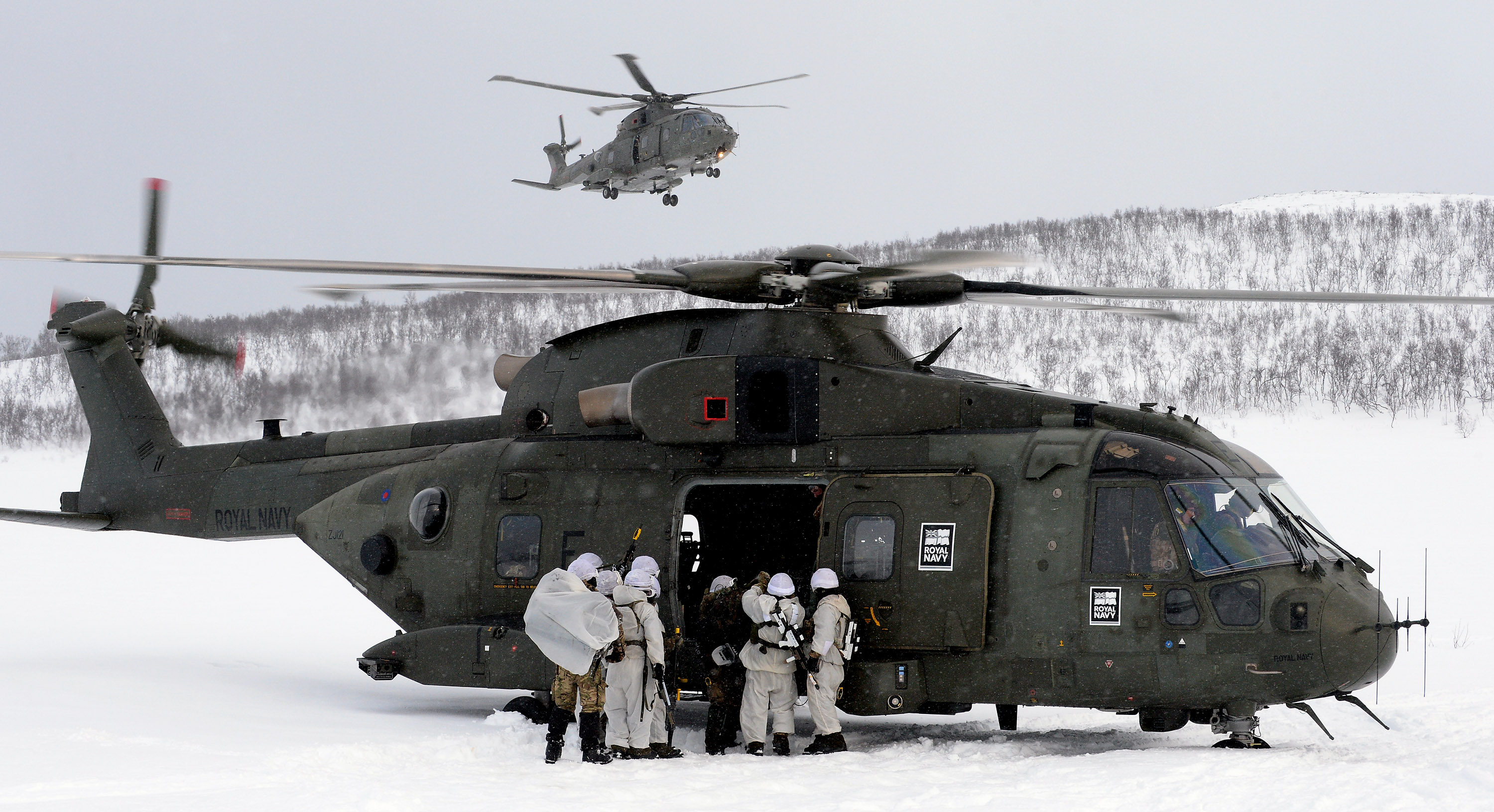
Two Commando Helicopter Force Merlin HC3 from 846 Naval Air Squadron on exercise with Royal Marine Commando's near Harstad in Norway

The Commando Helicopter Force has three Naval Air Squadrons with separate roles:

- 845 Naval Air Squadron – Medium-lift front line operational flights (A/B/C) – Merlin HC4
- 846 Naval Air Squadron – Medium-lift Operational Conversion Flight (OCF) and Maritime Counter Terrorism Air Group (MAG) – Merlin HC4/4A
- 847 Naval Air Squadron – Light-lift and battlefield reconnaissance – Wildcat AH1

An Aviation Combat Service Support (ACSS) Squadron and Commando Mobile Air Operations Team (Cdo MAOT) also form part of CHF.

845 and 846 NAS received Merlin HC3/3As to replace the retiring Sea Kings HC4s in 2014 and 2015. 846 NAS took their Merlin HC3s on 30 September 2014; 845 NAS followed on 9 July 2015. These are being upgraded to the Merlin Mk4/Mk4A as part of the Merlin Life Sustainment Programme (MLSP). The Merlin HC4 has a grey colour scheme, not the dark green colour of the "Junglie" Sea Kings.

Concurrently, 847 NAS has come to the end of the process of upgrading to the AgustaWestland AW159 Wildcat.

=== 845 Naval Air Squadron ===
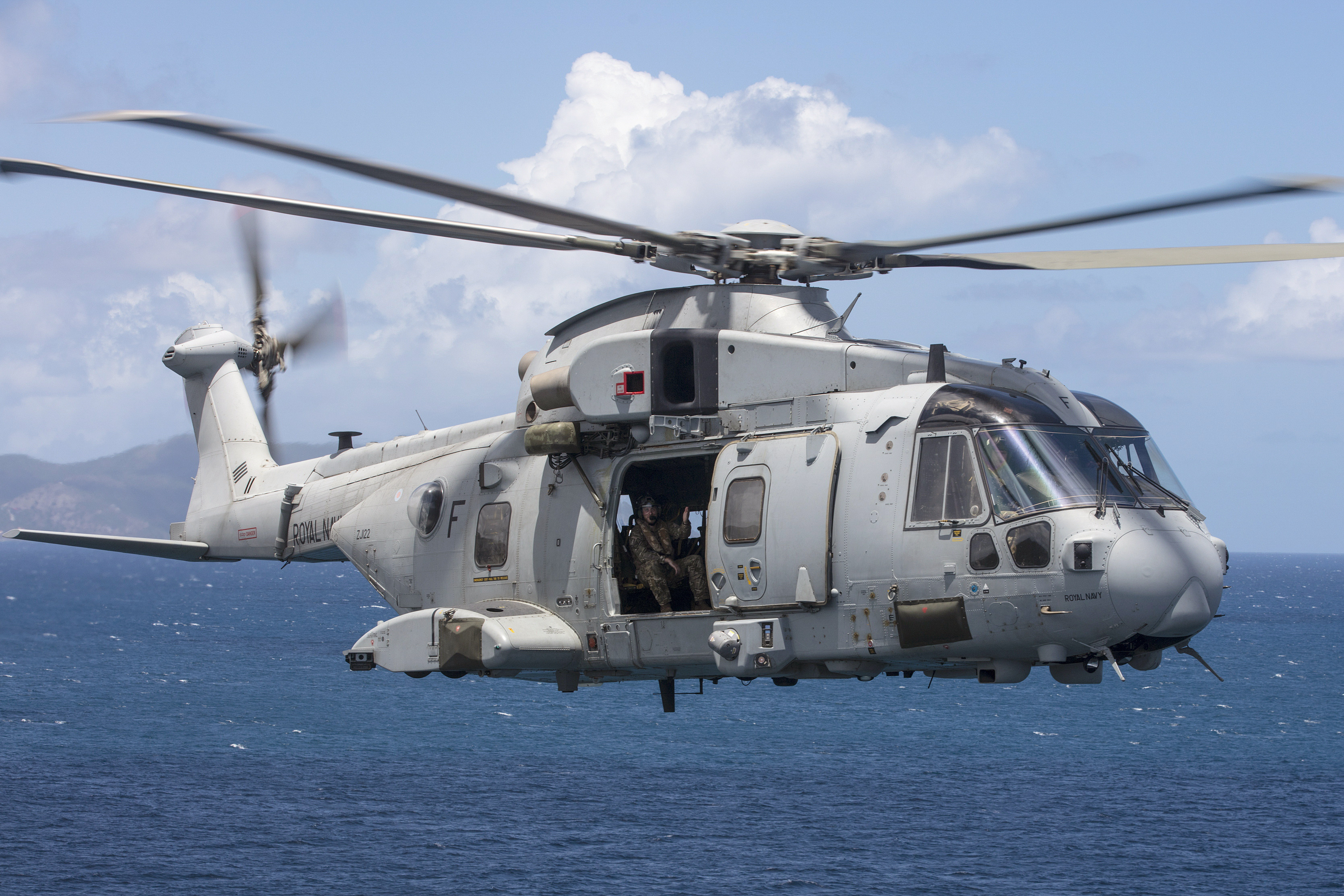
A Merlin HC4 wearing the current grey colour scheme used by the Commando Helicopter Force

845 NAS operated the Westland Sea King HC4 helicopter; a variant that has been specially modified for medium-lift transport and flying in all sorts of weather conditions and terrains. 845 had at least two of it Sea Kings deployed to the Bosnian theatre since 1992. Besides Bosnia, they have operated in Albania, Egypt, Honduras, Nigeria, Sierra Leone, Iraq and Afghanistan. 845 NAS was temporarily stationed at RAF Benson in Oxfordshire as part of the Merlin transition until it relocated back to RNAS Yeovilton on 20 June 2016.

=== 846 Naval Air Squadron ===
846 NAS operates with 845 NAS, but did not see action in Bosnia, being more focused on the Northern flank of the NATO theatre. Until recently, 846 maintained a base in Northern Ireland that allowed it to become very proficient in cold weather and winter operations. However, squadron operations are not limited to northern flying conditions and it has operated in South East Asia, Australia, the United States, and Germany. Two of the squadron's aircraft were sent to Turkey following the major earthquake it suffered in November 1999. 846 NAS was temporarily stationed at RAF Benson in Oxfordshire as part of the Merlin transition until it relocated back to RNAS Yeovilton on 26 March 2015.

In March 2016, 846 NAS was given the role of Maritime Counter Terrorism after the disbandment of 848 Naval Air Squadron and its Sea King HC4 helicopters.

=== 847 Naval Air Squadron ===
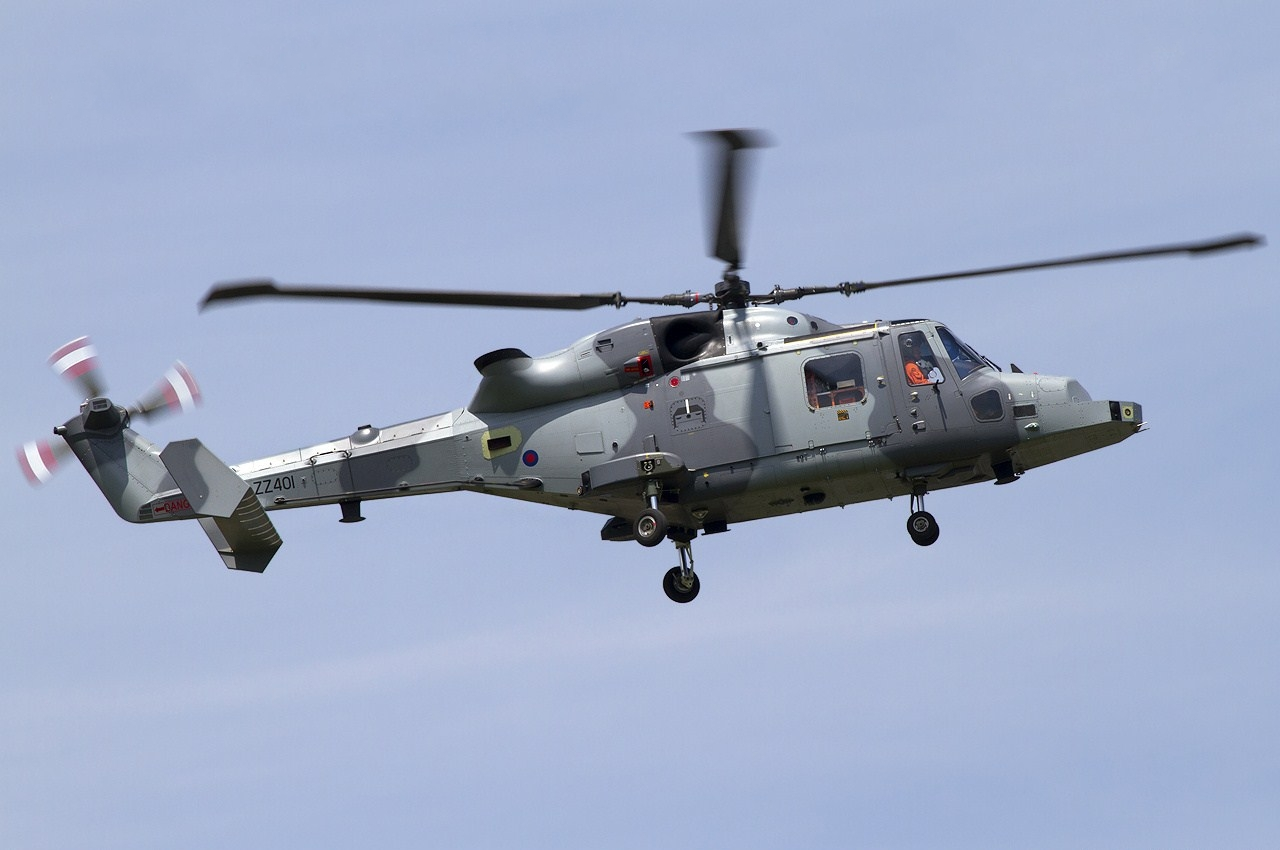
A Wildcat AH1 of the Commando Helicopter Force

847 NAS operates Wildcat AH1 helicopters, in light transport, control of joint fires, and reconnaissance roles.

== Decommissioned Unit ==
=== 848 Naval Air Squadron ===
848 Naval Air Squadron was the Commando Sea King HC4 training unit for the CHF, and trained not only the aircrews but also the ground crews. In addition to the skills necessary to fly their missions, Commando Helicopter Force members are trained in small-arms use as well as tactics and survival fieldcraft. Being a naval unit that was directly tasked with supporting the Royal Marines, trainees are also schooled in shipboard and amphibious assault operations. A special unit within 848 Squadron, M Flight, was tasked with supporting the Special Boat Service (SBS) in their operations. 848 NAS disbanded in 2013 but then reformed on 1 May 2015 to continue operating the Sea Kings, maintaining operational capability within the CHF while 845 NAS converted to the Merlin, until the Sea King reached its planned out of service date on 31 March 2016. 848 NAS disbanded 24 March 2016.

== Personnel ==
Aircrew, recruited from the Fleet Air Arm and Royal Marines, join the force having completed training in helicopter operations under No. 1 Flying Training School at RAF Shawbury.

== See also ==
- List of aircraft units of the Royal Navy
