= John Fieldhouse, Baron Fieldhouse =

Royal Navy Admiral of the Fleet (1928–1992)

Admiral of the Fleet The Right Honourable The Lord Fieldhouse GCB GBE
- Born: 12 February 1928; Leeds, West Riding of Yorkshire, England
- Died: 17 February 1992 (aged 64); Southampton, Hampshire, England
- Military career
- Allegiance: United Kingdom
- Branch: Royal Navy
- Service years: 1941–1989
- Rank: Admiral of the Fleet
- Commands: Chief of the Defence Staff; First Sea Lord; Commander-in-Chief Fleet; Flag Officer Submarines; Flag Officer, Second Flotilla; Standing Naval Force Atlantic; HMS Diomede; 10th Submarine Squadron; HMS Dreadnought; HMS Walrus; HMS Tiptoe; HMS Acheron; HMS Subtle
- Conflicts: Second World War; Aden Emergency; Falklands War
- Awards: Knight Grand Cross of the Order of the Bath; Knight Grand Cross of the Order of the British Empire
- Other work

Member of the House of Lords
- Lord Temporal
- Life peerage 26 February 1990 – 17 February 1992

Personal details
- Party: Crossbencher

Admiral of the Fleet John David Elliott Fieldhouse, Baron Fieldhouse, GCB, GBE (12 February 1928 – 17 February 1992) was a Royal Navy officer. He commanded five submarines and a frigate before achieving higher command from the 1970s. Following the invasion of the Falkland Islands by Argentine forces in April 1982, Fieldhouse was appointed Commander of the Task Force (designated Task Force 317) given responsibility for "Operation Corporate", the mission to recover the Falkland Islands. The campaign ended in the surrender of Argentine forces in June 1982. He became First Sea Lord and Chief of Naval Staff in December that year and, in that role, persuaded the British Government to fund the replacement of ships lost in the Falklands War. He went on to be Chief of the Defence Staff from 1985 until his retirement in 1988.

== Early life ==
Born in Leeds to Sir Harold Fieldhouse, who had been secretary of the National Assistance Board, and Mabel Elaine Fieldhouse (née Elliott), Fieldhouse was educated at the Royal Naval College, Dartmouth.

== Naval career ==
Fieldhouse joined the Royal Navy as a cadet in 1944. He was promoted to midshipman on 1 September 1945 and posted to the cruiser HMS Norfolk in November. Promoted to sub-lieutenant on 1 May 1947, he joined the Submarine Service in 1948 and was posted to the submarine HMS Thule in March 1949. He was promoted to lieutenant on 1 October and subsequently served in the submarines HMS Astute, HMS Aeneas and then HMS Totem. He completed the Submarine Command Course in 1955.

Fieldhouse took command of his first submarine, HMS Subtle, in January 1956 and went on to command the submarine HMS Acheron in March. Promoted to lieutenant commander on 1 October 1957, he took command of the submarine HMS Tiptoe in June 1958 and then joined the Department of Nuclear Science and Engineering at the Royal Naval College, Greenwich. He went on to command the submarine HMS Walrus from January 1961 and was promoted to commander on 31 December. In July 1964 he took command of HMS Dreadnought, the Royal Navy's first nuclear submarine. He attended the Joint Service Defence College in 1966, after which he became second-in-command of the aircraft carrier HMS Hermes. With Hermes, Fieldhouse was involved in the preparation for the British withdrawal from Aden during the Aden Emergency. Promoted to captain on 31 December 1967, he moved to Faslane Naval Base, Scotland to command the 10th Submarine Squadron of Resolution-class submarines. From October 1970, he commanded HMS Diomede, a frigate, as part of his overall command of the 3rd Frigate Squadron.

In 1972, with his promotion to commodore, Fieldhouse took command of the Standing Naval Force Atlantic. He then moved to the Ministry of Defence, initially as deputy director of Naval Warfare and then, from November 1973, as Director of Naval Warfare. He was appointed Flag Officer, Second Flotilla in December 1974, promoted to rear admiral on 7 January 1975, and became Flag Officer Submarines as well as NATO Commander Submarines Eastern Atlantic in November 1976. He was promoted to vice admiral on 1 April 1978, and became Controller of the Navy in January 1979. He was appointed a Knight Commander of the Order of the Bath in 1980 New Year Honours.

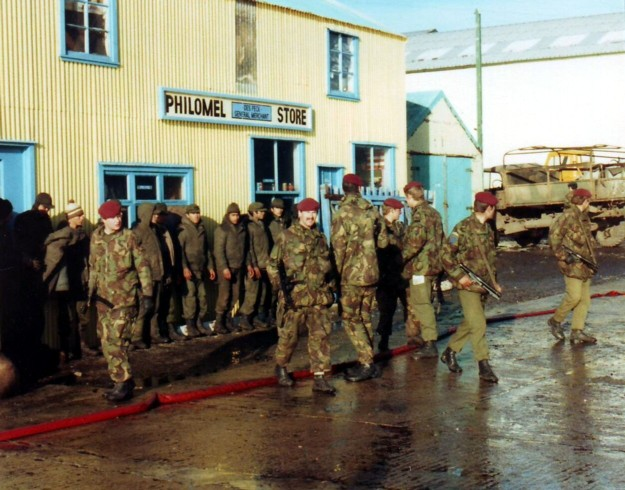
Argentine soldiers surrendering at the end of the Falklands War which Fieldhouse had directed from the Northwood Command Centre

Fieldhouse became Commander-in-Chief Fleet and NATO Commander-in-Chief, Channel and Commander-in-Chief Eastern Atlantic in April 1981, and received promotion to full admiral on 23 July 1981. Following the invasion of the Falkland Islands by Argentine forces in April 1982, Fieldhouse was appointed Commander of the Task Force (designated Task Force 317) given responsibility for "Operation Corporate", the mission to recover the Falkland Islands. He conducted the campaign, which ended in the surrender of Argentine forces in June 1982, from the Northwood Command Centre. He was advanced to Knight Grand Cross of the Order of the Bath in the 1982 Birthday Honours and appointed a Knight Grand Cross of the Order of the British Empire on 11 October 1982 "in recognition of service within the operations in the South Atlantic".

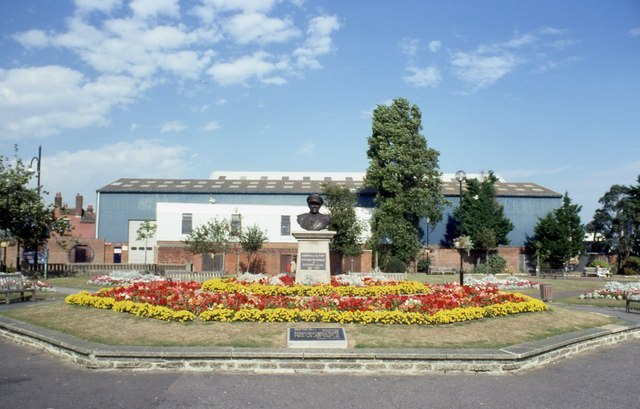
Bust of Fieldhouse in the Falklands Gardens, Gosport

Fieldhouse became First Sea Lord and Chief of Naval Staff on 1 December 1982: in that role he persuaded the British Government to fund the replacement of ships lost in the Falklands War. He was promoted to Admiral of the Fleet on 2 August 1985 and became Chief of the Defence Staff later that month. He stepped down as Chief in December 1988, and retired from the Navy in May 1989.

== Later life ==
Fieldhouse was made a life peer as Baron Fieldhouse, of Gosport in the County of Hampshire in 1990. In retirement he became a consultant to Vosper Thornycroft plc and his interests included sailing. In 1992 he had a major heart operation in Southampton General Hospital, subsequent to which he caught an infection and died there on 17 February 1992 at the age of 64.

== Family ==
In 1953 Fieldhouse married Margaret (Midge) Cull; they had a son and two daughters.

== Sources ==
- Heathcote, Tony (2002). The British Admirals of the Fleet 1734 – 1995. Pen & Sword Ltd. ISBN 0-85052-835-6.

Military offices
Preceded by Sir Iwan Raikes	Flag Officer Submarines; 1976–1978	Succeeded by Robert Squires
Preceded by Sir Richard Clayton	Controller of the Navy; 1979–1981	Succeeded by Sir Lindsay Bryson
Preceded by Sir James Eberle	Commander-in-Chief Fleet; 1981–1982	Succeeded by Sir William Staveley
Preceded by Sir Henry Leach	First Sea Lord; 1982–1985	Succeeded by Sir William Staveley
Preceded by Sir Edwin Bramall	Chief of the Defence Staff; 1985–1988	Succeeded by Sir David Craig
