= Richard Clayton (Royal Navy officer) =

Royal Navy Admiral (1925–1984)

Admiral Sir Richard Clayton GCB
- Born: 9 July 1925
- Died: 15 September 1984 (aged 59)
- Military career
- Allegiance: United Kingdom
- Branch: Royal Navy
- Service years: 1942 – 1981
- Rank: Admiral
- Commands: HMS Puma; Gibraltar Dockyard; HMS Kent; HMS Hampshire; Commander-in-Chief Naval Home Command
- Conflicts: World War II; Suez Crisis
- Awards: Knight Grand Cross of the Order of the Bath

Admiral Sir Richard Pilkington Clayton GCB (9 July 1925 – 15 September 1984) was Commander-in-Chief Naval Home Command.

== Naval career ==
Clayton joined the Royal Navy in 1942 and served as a midshipman on HMS Cumberland until 1943 when he was on various destroyers of the Home Fleet. He also served on HMS Striker during the Suez Crisis in 1956.

He became commanding officer of HMS Puma in 1958 and executive officer on HMS Lion in 1962. He became captain of the Gibraltar Dockyard in 1967 and then commanded HMS Kent and then HMS Hampshire in the late 1960s. He was appointed flag officer Second Flotilla in 1973 and senior naval member on directing Staff at the Royal College of Defence Studies in 1975.

He was appointed Controller of the Navy in 1975, was promoted to full admiral on 28 March 1978, and became commander-in-chief Naval Home Command in 1979. He retired in 1981.

In retirement he became a director at GEC and was a governor of Rendcomb College. He died in a motor cycling accident in September 1984.

== Honours ==
Clayton was appointed a Knight Commander of the Order of the Bath (KCB) in the 1978 New Year Honours, and promoted to Knight Grand Cross of the Order (GCB) in the 1980 Birthday Honours.

Military offices
Preceded by Sir Anthony Griffin	Controller of the Navy; 1975–1979	Succeeded by Sir John Fieldhouse
Preceded by Sir David Williams	Commander-in-Chief Naval Home Command; 1979–1981	Succeeded by Sir James Eberle
