= 845 Naval Air Squadron =

Flying squadron of the Royal Navy's Fleet Air Arm

- Badge
- Active: 1943–1945; 1955–1959; 1962 – present
- Country: United Kingdom
- Branch: Royal Navy
- Type: Commando Helicopter Force medium-lift squadron
- Role: Royal Marines: Tactical airlift; amphibious assault
- Part of: Fleet Air Arm; Joint Aviation Command; Commando Helicopter Force
- Naval Air Station: RNAS Yeovilton
- Nickname: 'Junglies'
- Mottos: Audio hostem (Latin for 'I hear the enemy')
- FAA battle honours: East Indies 1940-45; Falkland Islands 1982; Kuwait 1991; Al Faw 2003
- Website: Official website

Commanders
- Current commander: Commander Thomas Burrows

Aircraft flown
- Utility helicopter: AgustaWestland Merlin HC4

845 Naval Air Squadron is a squadron of the Royal Navy's Fleet Air Arm. Part of the Commando Helicopter Force, it is a specialist amphibious unit operating the AgustaWestland Commando Merlin HC4 helicopter and provides troop transport and load lifting support to the United Kingdom Commando Force and wider elements of the Royal Marines. In 2012, the squadron celebrated 50 years since it was awarded "commando" status.

The squadron is based at RNAS Yeovilton (HMS Heron) in Somerset.

== Role ==
The primary role of the squadron is to support the Royal Marines in amphibious assaults and wartime environments. It conducts medium-lift frontline operations in a variety of environments including desert, arctic, jungle and maritime. The squadron mainly conducts troop carrying, load-lifting, and maritime interdiction missions but can also perform CASEVAC and deployed SAR duties. They are the spearhead of the Commando Helicopter Force, held at high-readiness, and are a key part of the Royal Navy's expeditionary wartime capability.

== History ==
=== Beginnings ===
845 NAS formed on 1 January 1943, at USNAS Quonset Point, as a Torpedo Bomber Reconnaissance Squadron (TBRS) flying the new Grumman Avenger, designed as a much needed replacement for the ageing Fairey Swordfish. The squadron took part in its first active service by dive bombing an oil refinery at Surabaya, Java, in May 1944. For the following year, the squadron saw action over Malaya, Ceylon, and Sumatra before being disbanded in 1945.

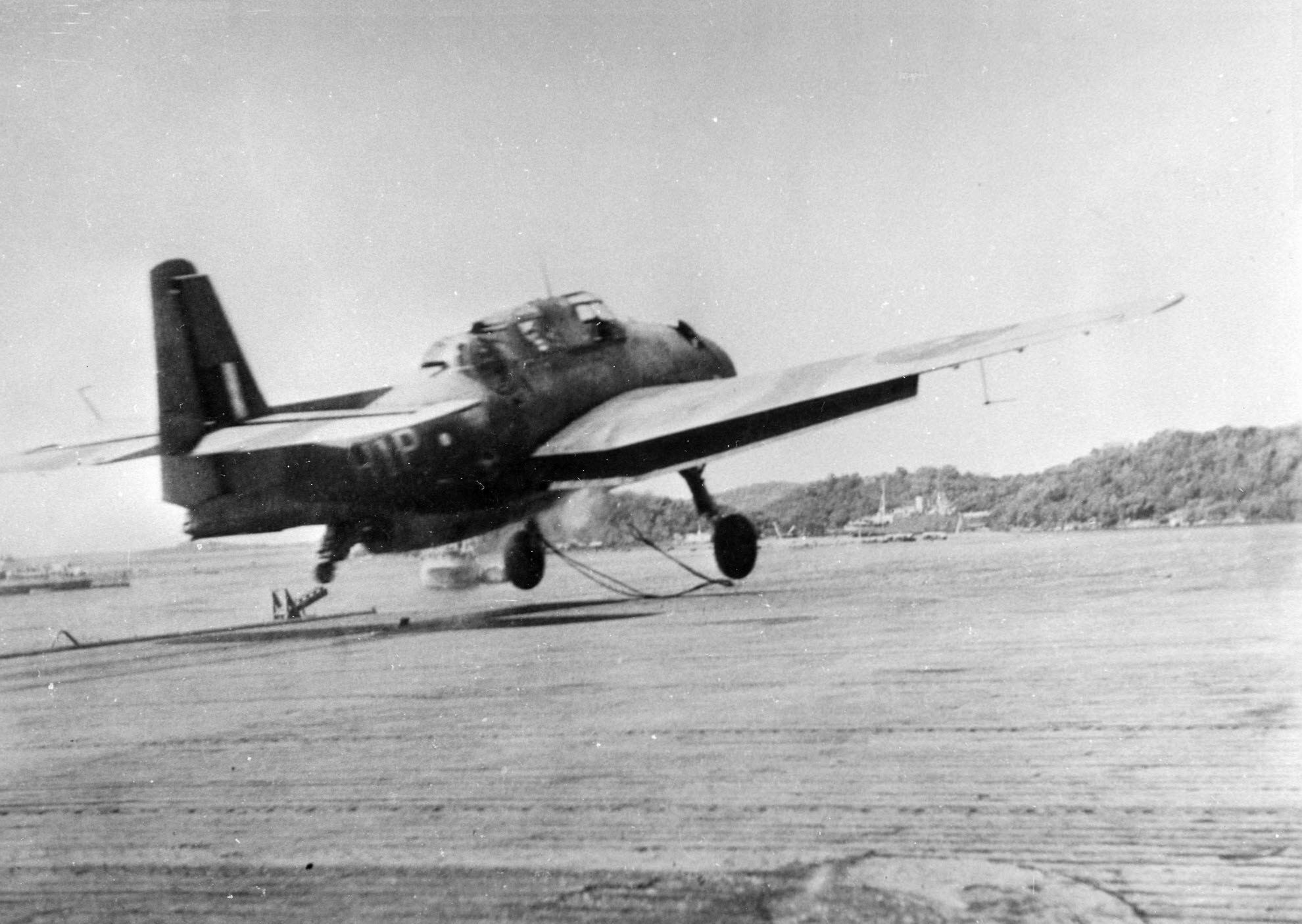
A Grumman Avenger from 845 Naval Air Squadron taking off from HMS Empress (D42) near the coast of Ceylon c. 1945

845 reformed on 15 March 1955, at Gosport to be an Anti Submarine unit flying the newly proved Westland Whirlwind HAS.22's, with which it saw service on several ships in the Mediterranean and Indonesia. Its job was to prove the new sonar technology and the navigational reliability of the Whirlwind. After returning to the UK, the squadron was disbanded briefly in October, before being reformed on 14 November 1955. In April 1956, the squadron deployed on Ocean and Theseus to partake in the fleet review and various training exercises. Much training was conducted with the Royal Marines in the vicinity of Malta and put them in great stead for the approaching Suez Crisis.

Although politically a failure, militarily, and particularly for the Navy, the Suez episode was a huge success. 845 NAS were involved in landing 515 Marines and 89 tons of equipment in history's 'first vertical assault'. Several aircraft were damaged from small arms fire, with one ditching on the way back to Theseus. Thankfully, all survived. The lessons of the Suez Crisis were not lost on the Government, which set about establishing amphibious forces capable of rapid deployment and response. The backbone of these forces would be helicopters operating from large ships designed for amphibious warfare.

Having re-equipped with Whirlwind HAS.7's, the squadron joined Bulwark for a commission in the Middle and Far East in late 1957. During this time, the squadron was involved in various exercises and troop moves as a result of the deteriorating situation in Aden. Shortly after this, the squadron was heavily involved in a salvage operation when two ships collided and caught fire in the Persian Gulf. A fire party was boarded and the wounded evacuated in 845 NAS helicopters. For its part in this long and difficult operation, the squadron was awarded the Boyd Trophy for the Navy's most outstanding piece of aviation in the year. During the 1950s, 845 NAS was the only squadron to operate as a front line ASW unit and was responsible for developing most of the doctrine used by today's ASW squadrons.

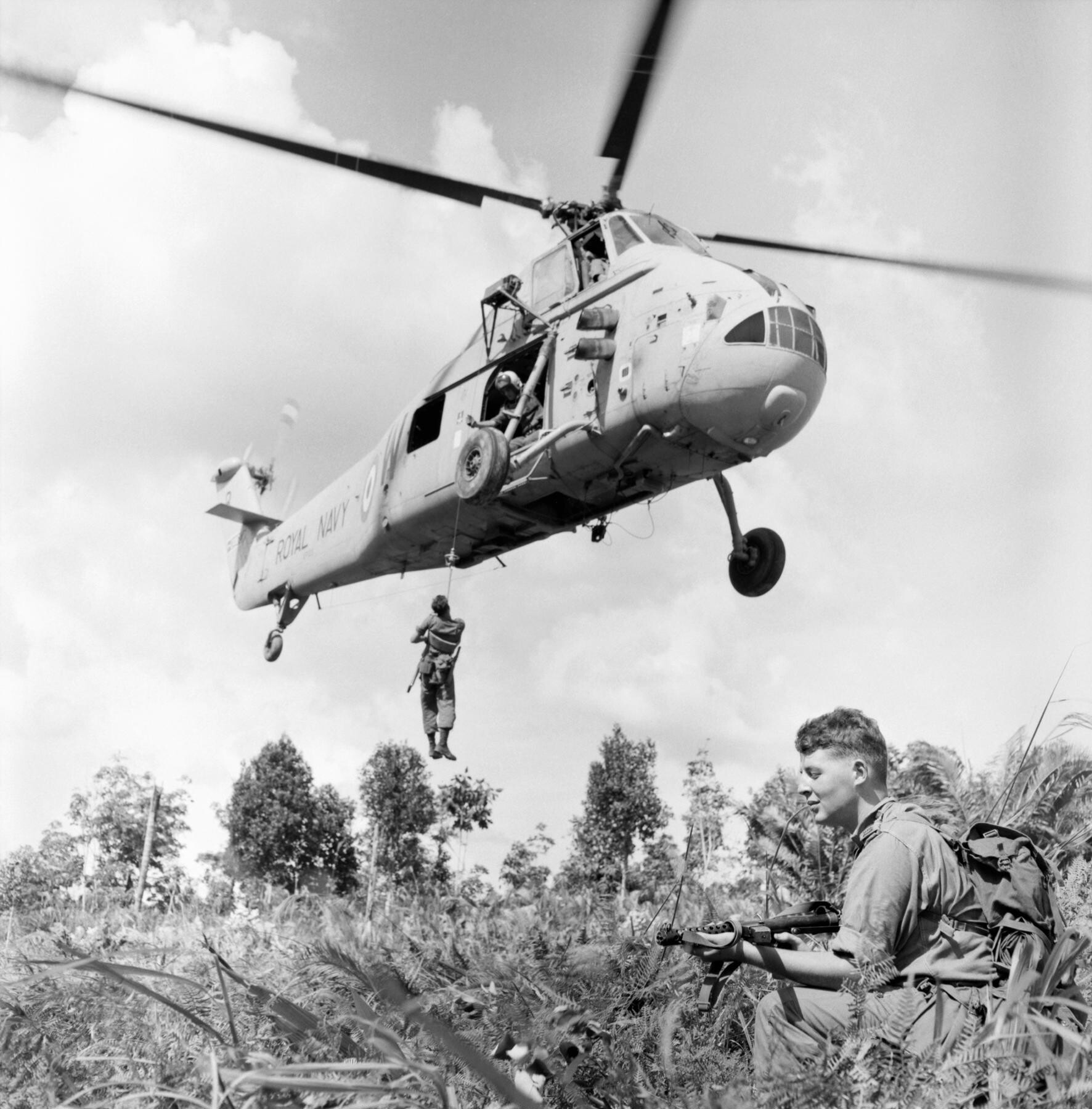
A Westland Wessex HAS.3 of 845 Naval Air Squadron operating during 1964 in Borneo, during the Indonesian Confrontation

After disbanding yet again in mid-1959, the squadron was reformed on 10 April 1962, as a Commando Helicopter Squadron with Westland Wessex HAS.1's. It was the first commando squadron to have these helicopters. While embarked aboard Albion later that year, the ship was ordered to make best speed for Singapore to help quell the rebellion in Brunei and the subsequent Indonesian inspired insurrection. Troops were landed in Borneo and the squadron was immediately committed to supporting British Forces ashore. They alone facilitated troops in being able to patrol vast areas of the jungle while operating from the most basic of clearings. In 1964, the squadron won the Boyd Trophy for a second time as a result of this operation, and the nickname 'Junglies' was born. After being relieved in 1965, by 848 Squadron, 845 returned to Culdrose, to re-equip with the new twin-turbine Wessex HU.5, B Flight of 845 returned to Borneo, in June 1966, and were the last Junglies. Bulwark embarked B Flight in October 1966, in Labuan.

After a few quiet years involving exercises all round the globe and the inclusion of Lieutenant The Prince of Wales (now King Charles III) in Red Dragon flight, the Ministry of Defence announced that a permanent presence was to be established in Northern Ireland, which resulted in a six weeks rolling roulement for all commando aircrew. Its aircraft were some of the first to render help to the mortar devastated Forkhill Special Forces base. In one month alone the Squadron flew 80% of all support helicopter task hours with just one third of the available assets.

In November 1971, the squadron prepared to abandon ship and evacuate Bulwark when a serious boiler room fire broke out while off the coast of (then) Jugoslavia. An area of flight deck aft from the rear hangar lift was all that could be used for flying because the crew were mustered for Emergency Stations on the flight deck. Plans for how to launch 21 aircraft from three spots in quick succession were rapidly made. The fire was brought under control and the squadron was stood down. One Marine Engineering Mechanic died in the fire. In January 1972, 845 embarked on Bulwark for Operation Exit, the withdrawal from Malta. Bulwark lay in Grand Harbour for 11 weeks and flew more than 1,000 missions. Prince Charles (now Charles III) served in the squadron in the 1970s.

=== Falklands ===
April 1982 brought the Argentine invasion of the Falkland Islands, which resulted in all crews being recalled from Ireland on 4 May to be on 24 hours notice. Others had already departed to the South Atlantic with the rest of the task force. After initially being tasked with resupplying the convoy while passing the Ascension Islands, the squadron inserted SAS troops into South Georgia, which preceded its recapture. The squadron continued to assist ground troops during the war before the white flag was eventually raised over Port Stanley.

=== 1990s ===
After the Falklands War, 845 NAS caught up with its sister squadron 846 in being equipped with the Sea King HC4 helicopter. Since then, 845 NAS has trained hard to be the UK's main contingency force capable of operating around the world. 1990 brought Operation Granby, which saw a force normally used to operating in Arctic conditions, deployed to the Arabian deserts of the Gulf. Consequently, the squadron was heavily involved in the First Gulf War, before returning to the UK and re-establishing a presence in Northern Ireland between 1992 and 2002.

The 1990s also saw 845 NAS deploy on operations in Bosnia during the Yugoslav Wars. It supported UNPROFOR and NATO peacekeeping missions in the country, providing transportation and evacuating refugees and casualties. The first British helicopter squadron into Bosnia, 845 NAS was also the last squadron to leave in 2005.

=== 2000s ===
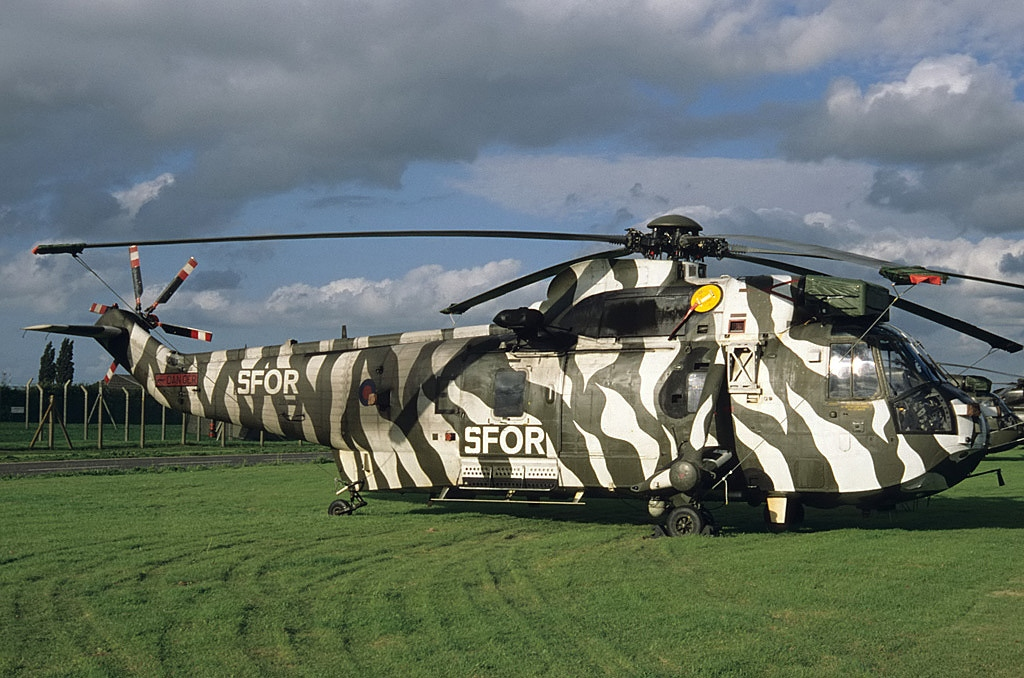
A Sea King HC4 of 845 Naval Air Squadron wearing Stabilisation Force (SFOR) markings from operations in Bosnia and Herzegovina

Besides Bosnia, the squadron was also called to the initial deployment to Afghanistan after the 11 September attacks, on Operation Oracle.

During the same period, 845 NAS also met commitments in Sierra Leone, and in 2003 took the first troops into Iraq during the assault on the Al-Faw Peninsula. Having left Iraq in 2007, the squadron then deployed to Afghanistan where they have been operating in Helmand Province and primarily based at Camp Bastion.

=== 2010s ===
In October 2011, they returned from Afghanistan to their base in Somerset. Back in the UK, the squadron provides aviation support to infantry training, and takes part in numerous amphibious exercises, thereby ensuring that the UK is able to effectively operate in the littoral environment and so is prepared for any contingency. This was shown in 2011 during Operation Ellamy in and around Libya.

845 received its Merlin Helicopters from the former 28 (Army Cooperation) Squadron RAF in July 2015 and participated in Exercise Black Alligator from mid-August to early October 2015.

In June 2019 the squadron embarked on RFA Argus for a deployment to the Baltic Sea as part of the Joint Expeditionary Force. The squadron practised amphibious landings alongside the Wildcats of 847 NAS as part of exercise Baltic Protector in the Baltic Sea.

It is stated that it is one of the FAA squadrons for the Joint Expeditionary Force (Maritime).

=== 2020s ===
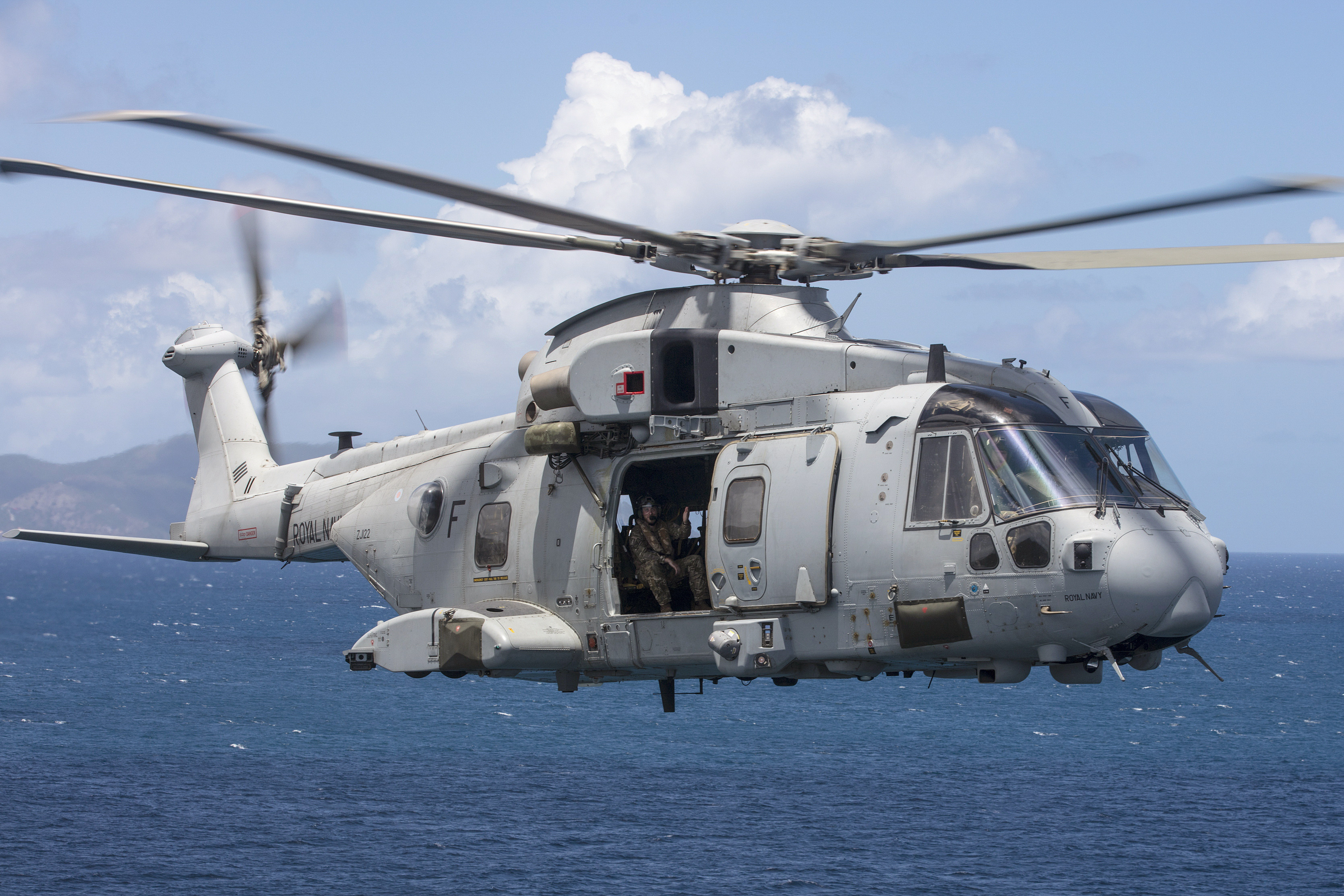
An AgustaWestland Merlin HC4 of 845 Naval Air Squadron in the Caribbean during 2020

In 2020 the squadron was activated to deploy to the Caribbean as part of Atlantic Patrol Tasking North (APT (N)). Embarked in RFA Argus the squadron spent eight months in the region to provide support to British Overseas Territories during the hurricane season, whilst also working in conjunction with the United States Coastguard in counter narcotic operations. During B Flight’s tenure in the area the squadron, alongside the United States Military, provided disaster relief to Honduras in the wake of Hurricanes Eta and Iota that hit in late November.

In April 2021 B Flight deployed as part of the Royal Navy’s Carrier Strike Group’s maiden deployment, Operation Fortis.

In January 2022, A Flight deployed to Royal Norwegian Air Force (RNoAF) Bardufoss alongside 847 Naval Air Squadron and the United States Marine Corps to participate in the NATO exercise, Cold Response.

From September to December 2022, B Flight embarked in RFA Argus alongside 847 Naval Air Squadron for Littoral Response Group South (LRG(S)). The task group provided a sustained presence and reassurance whilst working with numerous NATO partners and regional allies in the Mediterranean and North Africa. Whilst on Exercise Lion Strike in Montenegro, personnel from the squadron happened across a stray puppy which they sought to adopt and bring back to the UK. Through social media campaigning the squadron raised over £6000 and began the processes to bring ‘KT’ the puppy (named after her love for cable ties) home.

== Aircraft operated ==
The squadron operated a variety of different aircraft and versions:

- Grumman Avenger I
- Grumman Wildcat V
- Westland Whirlwind HAS22, HAR3 & HAS7
- Westland Wessex HAS1 & HU5
- Hiller HT 2
- Westland Wasp HAS1
- Westland Sea King HC4
- AgustaWestland Merlin HC3/3A
- AgustaWestland Commando Merlin HC4 (current)

== Battle honours ==
845 Naval Air Squadron has received the following battle honours:

- East Indies 1940-45
- Falkland Islands 1982
- Kuwait 1991
- Al Faw 2003

== See also ==
- Exercise Strikeback
