= HMS Aeneas =

Royal Navy submarine

- Amphion-class submarine HMS Aeneas

History

United Kingdom
- Name: HMS Aeneas
- Namesake: Aeneas
- Builder: Cammell Laird
- Laid down: 10 October 1944
- Launched: 25 October 1945
- Commissioned: 31 July 1946
- Identification: Pennant number P427
- Fate: Sold for scrap on 14 November 1974

General characteristics
- Class & type: Amphion-class submarine
- Displacement: 1,385/1,620 tons (surface/submerged)
- Length: 279 ft 3 in (85.12 m)
- Beam: 22 ft 4 in (6.81 m)
- Draught: 18 ft 1 in (5.51 m)
- Depth: 500 feet (150 m)
- Propulsion: 2 × 4,400 bhp (3,300 kW) Vickers supercharged diesel engine, 2 × 1,250 hp (930 kW), two shafts
- Speed: 18.5 knots (34.3 km/h; 21.3 mph) surfaced; 8 knots (15 km/h; 9.2 mph) submerged
- Range: 10,500 nautical miles (12,100 mi; 19,400 km) at 11 knots (13 mph; 20 km/h) surfaced; 16,000 nautical miles (18,000 mi; 30,000 km) at 8 knots (9.2 mph; 15 km/h) submerged
- Test depth: 600 ft (180 m)
- Complement: 61 (6 officers and 5 sailors)
- Armament: 10 × 21 inch (533 mm) torpedo tubes; 18 mines; 1 × 4 in (102 mm) MK XXIII main deck gun, 3 × 0.303 in (7.70 mm) machine gun, 1 × Oerlikon 20 mm gun

HMS Aeneas (P427) was a British Amphion-class submarine of the Royal Navy, built by Cammell Laird and launched on 9 October 1945. She was named after the hero Aeneas from Greek mythology.

== Design ==
The Amphion-class or A class submarines were designed after the T-class submarines. They were designed to serve in the Pacific campaign, but most of them weren't completed before the campaign ended. The Amphion-class submarines displaced 1385 tons surfaced and 1620 tons submerged. Their surface speed was 18.5 knots (34.3 km/h; 21.3 mph), and their submerged speed was 8 knots (15 km/h; 9.2 mph). The submarines were powered by diesel electric propulsion and two shafts. The crew strength onboard was 6 officers and 55 sailors. The submarines had ten 21 in (530 mm) torpedo tubes and carried a total of 20 torpedoes. There were four torpedo tubes on the bow, two on the bow exterior, two on the stern and two on the stern exterior. There were three 0.303 machine guns and one Oerlikon 20mm cannon which served as the anti-aircraft guns. The main deck gun was the QF 4-inch Mk XXII, which was later replaced with the QF 4-inch naval gun Mk XXIII.

Aeneas was fitted with 2-shaft Vickers supercharged diesel engines which produced 4,400 bhp (3,300 kW). Aeneas also had 2 electric motors which produced 1,200 shp (890 kW). Aeneas was 279 feet 3 inches (85.12 m) long overall, had a beam of 22 feet 3 inches (6.78 m) and a draught of 17 feet 3 inches (5.26 m). The ship could carry 165 tons of fuel as a normal load and 219 tons of fuel as its maximum load. 60 tons were stored in internal tanks and 100 tons in external tanks, an extra 54 tons could be stored in the main tanks. Aeneas had a tinplated, circular-welded pressure hull, almost equivalent to a double hull. This allowed the ship to dive to a maximum operstional depth of 500 feet (150 m) and a test depth of 600 feet (180 m), though they would be moderately damaged below 200–300 feet (61–91 m). The Amphion-class submarines were planned to be fitted with submarine snorkels (snorts), however, they were not fitted on all ships at first.

== Service history ==
Aeneas was ordered on 7 April 1943 and built by Cammell Laird in Birkenhead. She was laid down on 28 April 1944, launched on 5 October 1945 and commissioned on 31 July 1946.

In 1950, engineers from Harwell Laboratory visited Aeneas and HMS Ambush at Fort Blockhouse in Gosport to learn about features required in submarines. The Harwell engineers were then developing nuclear submarines. They discovered space constraints on submarines and the need to keep sound levels low.

After World War II and before 1961, Aeneas was commanded by Iwan Raikes, who would later become a Vice-Admiral. From 1951 to 1952, Lieutenant (later Admiral of the Fleet) John Fieldhouse, Baron Fieldhouse served on the Aeneas.

Aeneas took part in the Coronation Review of the Fleet to celebrate the Coronation of Queen Elizabeth II in 1953.

Aeneas played the part of the M1 submarine in the 1967 James Bond film You Only Live Twice.

In 1972, Aeneas was loaned to Vickers for trials of the Submarine-Launched Airflight Missile (SLAM) system. The SLAM was a system which used Shorts Blowpipe missiles to attack helicopters participating in anti-submarine warfare. The submarine would rise to periscope depth and the periscope would be used to spot the target. However, the SLAM system was not developed further because it was not operable in the night.

From 7 to 18 January 1972, Aeneas participated in Exercise Vendetta, along with HMS Dreadnought, HMS Ocelot, HMS Osiris and HMS Opposum. Aeneas was placed on the disposal list by the UK government in 1973.

On 26 September 2012, at the company's Le Mourillon plant, DNCS announced plans to design and build a submarine canister-based air defence weapon based on MBDA's Mistral. The concept is based on the British SLAM, Submarine Launched Airflight Missile, (Note: Not to be confused with the American SLAM Stand off Land Attack Missile) which was based on the Blowpipe developed by Vickers in the 1970s, and used onboard Aeneas.

The ship was sold on 14 November 1974 and scrapped at Dunston on Tyne.

== Bibliography ==
- Boniface, Patrick (2003). Dreadnought: Britain's First Nuclear Powered Submarine. Cornwall: Periscope Publishing. ISBN 9781904381099.
- Campbell, N. J. M (1980). "Great Britain". Conway's All The World's Fighting Ships, 1922-1946. London: Conway Maritime Press. pp. 2–85. ISBN 9780851771465.
- Heathcote, T. A. (2002). The British Admirals of the Fleet 1734 – 1995: A Biographical Dictionary. Barnsley, South Yorkshire: Pen & Sword. ISBN 9781473812703.
- Jinks, James; Hennessy, Peter (2015). The Silent Deep: The Royal Navy Submarine Service Since 1945. London: Penguin UK. ISBN 9780141973708.
- Jones, Gareth Michael (2022). The Development of Nuclear Propulsion in the Royal Navy, 1946-1975. London: Palgrave Macmillan. doi:10.1007/9783031051296. ISBN 9783031051296.
- Keleny, Anne (19 January 2012). "Vice-Admiral Sir Iwan Raikes: Decorated submariner". The Independent.
