= HMS Kent (D12) =

Batch-1 County-class destroyer of the Royal Navy commissioned in 1963

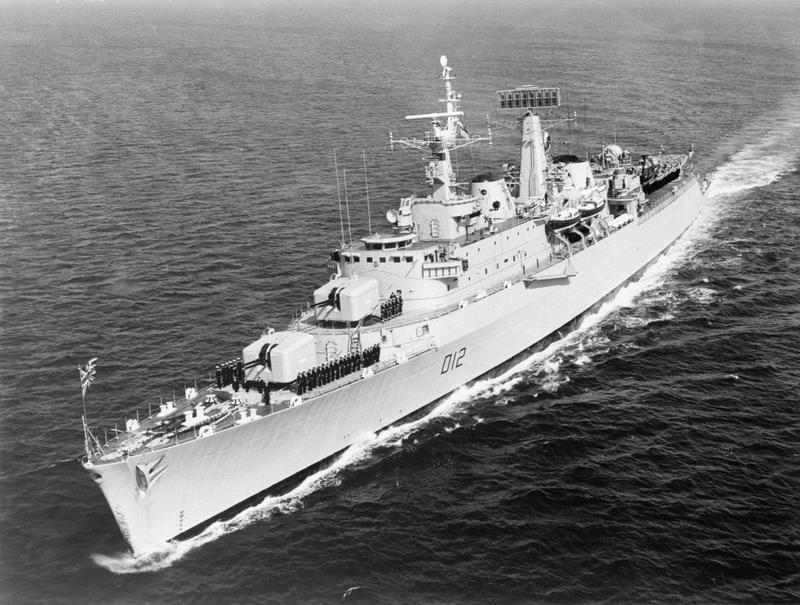
- HMS Kent, c. 1963 (IWM)

History

United Kingdom
- Name: HMS Kent
- Namesake: Kent
- Ordered: 6 February 1957
- Builder: Harland & Wolff, Belfast
- Laid down: 1 March 1960
- Launched: 27 September 1961
- Commissioned: 15 August 1963
- Decommissioned: 1980
- Stricken: 1993
- Identification: Pennant number: D12
- Fate: Sold for scrap in 1998

General characteristics
- Class & type: County-class destroyer
- Displacement: 6,200 tons (6,800 tons full load)
- Length: 158.6 m (520 ft 4 in)
- Beam: 53 ft (16 m)
- Draught: 20 ft (6.1 m)
- Propulsion: COSAG (Combined steam and gas) turbines, 2 shafts
- Speed: 31.5 knots (58.3 km/h)
- Range: 3,500 nautical miles (6,500 km)
- Complement: 470
- Armament: 1× Sea Slug GWS.2 twin-arm SAM launcher(36 missiles); 2× Sea Cat GWS.21 twin-arm SAM launcher(60 missiles); 4× 4.5 in (114 mm) /45 DP (2× twin gunned turret); 2× 20 mm AA; 2× triple-tubes for 12¾ inch (324 mm) ASW torpedo
- Aircraft carried: 1× Lynx or Wessex helicopter
- Aviation facilities: Flight deck and enclosed hangar for embarking one helicopter

HMS Kent was a batch-1 County-class destroyer of the Royal Navy. She and her sisters were equipped with the Sea Slug Mk-1 medium-range surface-to-air missile SAM system, along with the short-range Sea Cat SAM, two twin 4.5-inch gun turrets, two single 20mm cannon, ASW torpedo tubes, and a platform and hangar that allowed her to operate one Wessex helicopter. The County class were large ships, with good seakeeping abilities and long range, and were ideal blue-water ships for their time.

== Construction and design ==
Kent was one of two County-class destroyers ordered under the British Admiralty's 1956–57 shipbuilding programme. She was laid down at Harland & Wolff's Belfast shipyard on 1 March 1960 and launched by Princess Marina, Duchess of Kent on 27 September 1961. The ship was completed on 15 August 1963.

Kent was 521 feet 6 inches (158.95 m) long overall and 505 feet (153.92 m) between perpendiculars, with a beam of 54 feet (16.46 m) and a draught of 20 feet 6 inches (6.25 m). Displacement was 6,200 long tons (6,300 t) normal and 6,800 long tons (6,900 t) deep load. The ship was propelled by a combination of steam turbines and gas turbines in a Combined steam and gas (COSAG) arrangement, driving two propeller shafts. Each shaft could by driven by a single 15,000 shaft horsepower (11,000 kW) steam turbine (fed with steam at 700 pounds per square inch (4,800 kPa) and 950 °F (510 °C; 783 K)) from Babcock & Wilcox boilers) and two Metrovick G6 gas turbines (each rated at 7,500 shaft horsepower (5,600 kW)), with the gas turbines being used for high speeds and to allow a quick departure from ports without waiting for steam to be raised. Maximum speed was 30 knots (35 mph; 56 km/h) and the ship had a range of 3,500 nautical miles (4,000 mi; 6,500 km) at 28 knots (32 mph; 52 km/h).

A twin launcher for the Seaslug anti-aircraft missile was fitted aft. The Seaslug GWS1 was a beam riding missile which had an effective range of about 19 mi; 31 km. Up to 39 Seaslugs could be carried horizontally in a magazine that ran much of the length of the ship. Close-in anti-aircraft protection was provided by a pair of Seacat missile launchers, while two twin QF 4.5 inch Mark V gun mounts were fitted forward. A helicopter deck and hangar allowed a single Westland Wessex helicopter to be operated.

A Type 965 long-range air-search radar and a Type 278 height-finding radar was fitted on the ship's mainmast, with a Type 992 surface/low level air search and target indication radar and an array of ESM aerials were mounted on the ship's foremast. Type 901 fire control radar for the Seaslug missile was mounted aft. Type 184 sonar was fitted.

== Operational service ==
After her commissioning and work-up, Kent spent the balance of her career as an escort to the Royal Navy's aircraft carrier fleet. She deployed at various times with Victorious, Eagle, and Hermes in the Atlantic, Indian, and Pacific Oceans. She was hard worked throughout the 1960s, along with her batch-1 County sister ships, as they were the only guided missile-armed destroyers in the fleet until the latter half of the 1960s.

One role was as host ship for the Withdrawal from Empire negotiations in Gibraltar (citation needed). She suffered a fire during refitting in 1976 but was soon repaired and was present for the Silver Jubilee fleet review of 1977.

In the late 1960s all four of the batch-1 County-class vessels were planned to be upgraded with the superior Sea Slug Mk-2 system, but the upgrades were cancelled in 1967–68 because the amount of time the ships would be out of the operational fleet while being refitted. However, some batch-2 improvements were made during mid life refits, including upgrading the Seacat system from GWS21 to GWS22 and fitting Type 992Q target indicator radar instead of Type 992. Kent was refitted from June 1969 to December 1972.

== Decommissioning and harbour service ==
Kent was decommissioned in the summer of 1980, after only 17 years of active service and became the replacement for HMS Fife and Fleet Training Ship (FTS), moored to the lower end of Whale Island outboard of the defunct support ship HMS Rame Head opposite Fountain Lake, Portsmouth Naval Base. At the beginning of the Falklands War, she was surveyed for possible recommissioning (her large size, helicopter deck and four 4.5-inch guns would have made her a good command and shore bombardment ship), but her two years of neglect left her in such a state that extensive repairs would be necessary to render her seaworthy, and no work was started.

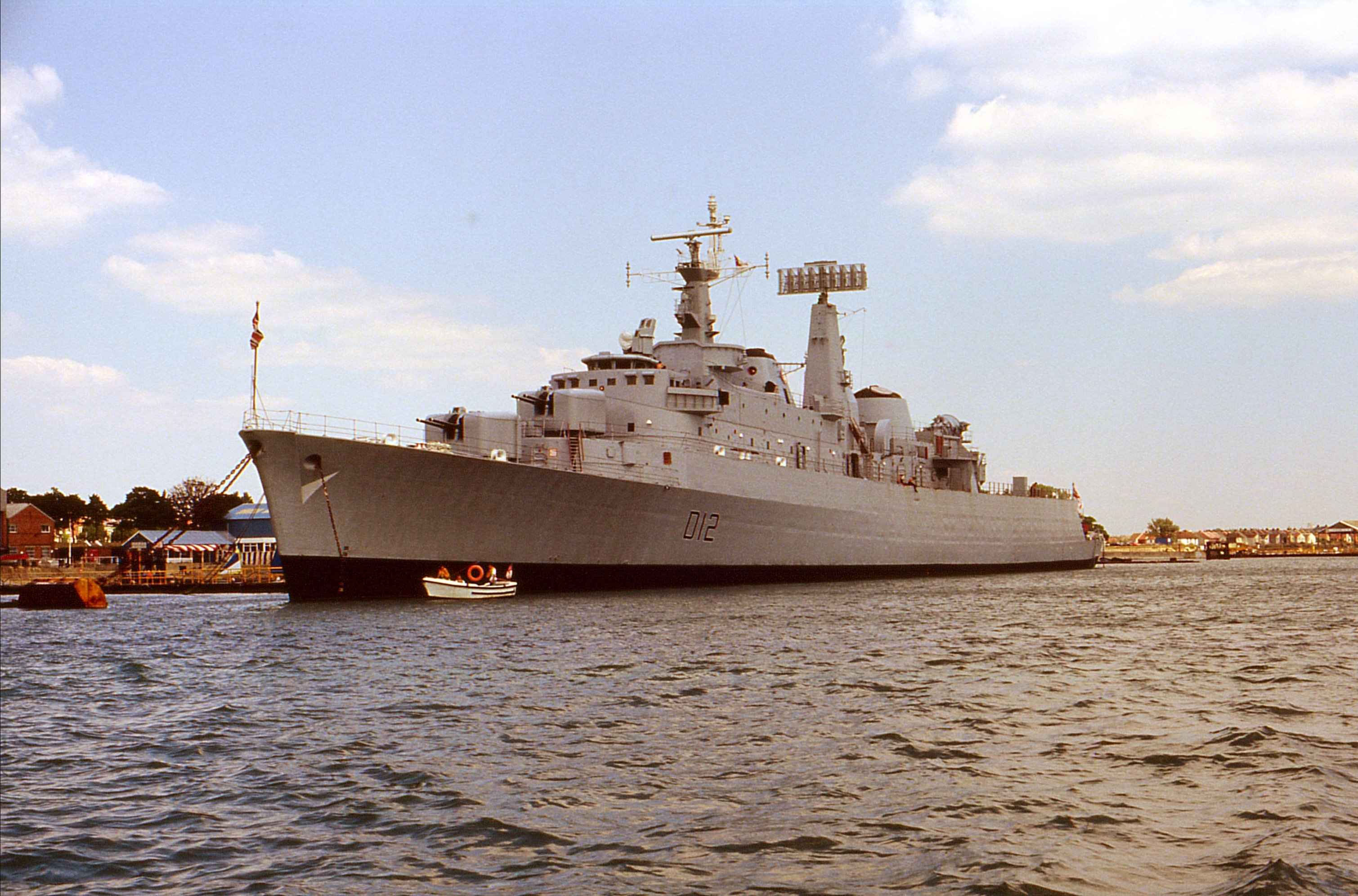
HMS Kent as a training ship, 1989

She spent 1982 through to 1984 as a live asset for artificer and mechanic training supporting HMS Collingwood and HMS Sultan, her machinery largely in serviceable condition.

In 1984 she also became a harbour training ship for the Sea Cadet Corps. She was paid off from this in 1987 and became a training hulk at Portsmouth until stricken in 1993, though she lingered on, tied up to the same pier at Portsmouth Naval Base until 1996.

Kent was sold for scrap, and in 1998 she was towed to India to be broken up.

== Commanding officers ==
Notable commanding officers include Iwan Raikes in 1968, Richard P Clayton between 1968 and 1969 and Jock Slater in 1976–1977.

== Bibliography ==
- Blackman, Raymond V. B. (1971). Jane's Fighting Ships 1971–72. London: Sampson Low, Marston & Co. Ltd. ISBN 0-354-00096-9.
- Colledge, J. J.; Warlow, Ben (2006) [1969]. Ships of the Royal Navy: The Complete Record of All Fighting Ships of the Royal Navy from the 15th Century to the Present (3rd Rev ed.). London: Chatham Publishing. ISBN 978-1-86176-281-8. OCLC 67375475.
- Friedman, Norman (2008). British Destroyers & Frigates: The Second World War and After. Barnsley, UK: Seaforth Publishing. ISBN 978-1-84832-015-4.
- Gardiner, Robert; Chumbley, Stephen (1995). Conway's All The World's Fighting Ships 1947–1995. Annapolis, Maryland, USA: Naval Institute Press. ISBN 1-55750-132-7.
- Marriott, Leo (1989). Royal Navy Destroyers Since 1945. Shepperton, UK: Ian Allan. ISBN 0-7110-1817-0.
- McCart, Neil (2014). County Class Guided Missile Destroyers. Maritime Books. ISBN 978-1904459637.
