= HMS Talent (P337) =

Submarine of the Royal Navy

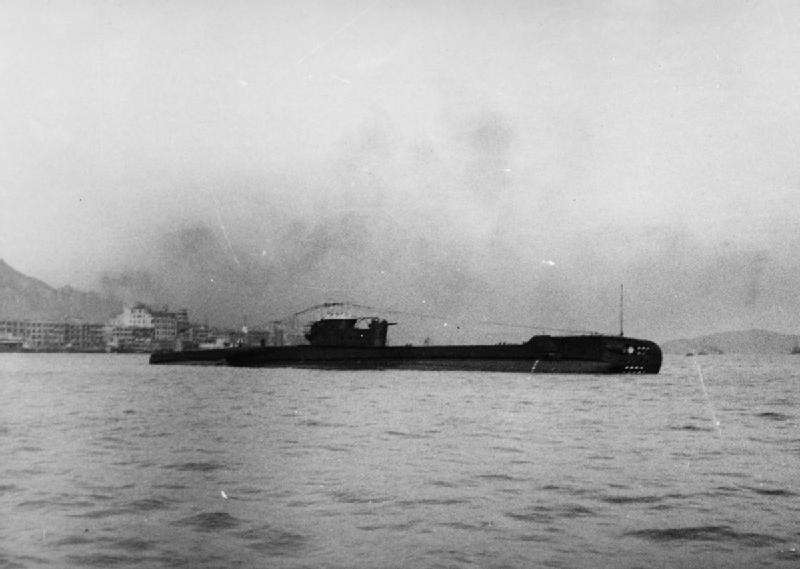
- HMS Talent

History

United Kingdom
- Name: HMS Talent
- Builder: Vickers-Armstrongs, Barrow
- Laid down: 21 March 1944
- Launched: 13 February 1945
- Commissioned: 27 July 1945
- Identification: Pennant number P337
- Fate: Scrapped, 1 February 1970
- Badge

General characteristics
- Class & type: British T class submarine
- Displacement: 1,290 tons surfaced; 1,560 tons submerged
- Length: 276 ft 6 in (84.28 m)
- Beam: 25 ft 6 in (7.77 m)
- Draught: 12 ft 9 in (3.89 m) forward; 14 ft 7 in (4.45 m) aft
- Propulsion: Two shafts; Twin diesel engines 2,500 hp (1.86 MW) each; Twin electric motors 1,450 hp (1.08 MW) each
- Speed: 15.5 knots (28.7 km/h) surfaced; 9 knots (20 km/h) submerged
- Range: 4,500 nautical miles at 11 knots (8,330 km at 20 km/h) surfaced
- Test depth: 300 ft (91 m) max
- Complement: 61
- Armament: 6 internal forward-facing 21 inch (533 mm) torpedo tubes; 2 external forward-facing torpedo tubes; 2 external amidships rear-facing torpedo tubes; 1 external rear-facing torpedo tubes; 6 reload torpedoes; QF 4 inch (100 mm) deck gun; 3 anti aircraft machine guns

HMS Talent was a British submarine of the third group of the T class. She was built as P337(S37) by Vickers-Armstrongs, Barrow, and launched on 13 February 1945. She was originally to have been named HMS Tasman, but was this was changed to Talent after the previous HMS Talent was transferred to the Royal Netherlands Navy, this may have also been the case due to confusion with HMNZS Tasman in Lyttelton, New Zealand.

== Service ==
Talent saw little action, but still had an eventful career. Her first commission was spent in the Far East after which she returned to the UK. She then spent her commissions alternating between the home and Mediterranean stations. In 1953 she took part in the Fleet Review to celebrate the Coronation of Queen Elizabeth II.

On 15 December 1954 she was involved in an accident, claiming four lives. She was washed out of drydock at Chatham Dockyard and not found until the following day. After this accident all caissons at Chatham that were on the river (tidal) were chained down to prevent them lifting and they were inspected more regularly to ensure that they were full of water.

She was reconstructed between 1954 and 1956, when she was streamlined and modified, including the removal of her 4-inch gun. She was then damaged in a collision while dived off the Isle of Wight on 8 May 1956. Talent was later used for a publicity trip around the south and east coasts of England in October 1960, being visited by over 33,000 people.

She was refitted at Malta between late 1960 and early 1961, and was thereafter active in the Mediterranean. She returned to the UK in May 1962 and was present at Portsmouth Navy Days in 1965. She was decommissioned on 19 December 1966 and was finally scrapped at Troon, Scotland on 1 February 1970.

== Publications ==
- Colledge, J. J.; Warlow, Ben (2006) [1969]. Ships of the Royal Navy: The Complete Record of All Fighting Ships of the Royal Navy from the 15th Century to the Present (3rd Rev ed.). London: Chatham Publishing. ISBN 978-1-86176-281-8. OCLC 67375475.
- Hutchinson, Robert (2001). Jane's Submarines: War Beneath the Waves from 1776 to the Present Day. London: HarperCollins. ISBN 978-0-00-710558-8. OCLC 53783010.
