= Boyd Trophy =

Royal Navy aviation award

The Boyd Trophy is a silver model of a Fairey Swordfish, which was presented by the Fairey Aviation Company Limited in 1946, in commemoration of the work for Naval Aviation of Admiral Sir Denis Boyd, KCB, CBE, DSC, RN. It is awarded annually to the naval pilot(s) or aircrew who, in the opinion of the Flag Officer, Naval Air Command, has achieved the finest feat of aviation during the previous year. It is held by the ship, station or establishment in which the winner(s) was/were serving at the time the winning feat was achieved.

List of Boyd Trophy Recipients
Year	Recipient	Reason
1946	Lt.Cdr. D.B. Law; Lt. Reynolds	Formation aerobatic display in Seafires at St Merryn.
1947	Lt.Cdr. H.J. Mortimore, CO of 733 Squadron	Leading a flight of three Expeditors from Trincomalee to Lee-on-Solent in adverse weather conditions.
1948	Lt.Cdr. E.M. Brown, RAE Farnborough	Trials with Rubber Deck.
1949	1830 Squadron RNVR	205 accident free deck landings during embarked period in HMS Illustrious.
1950	17th Carrier Air Group, HMS Theseus	Operations in Korea.
1951	814 Squadron	Night flying in HMS Vengeance.
1952	802 and 825 Squadrons	Operations in Korea.
1953	848 Squadron	Operations in Malaya.
1954	Naval Test Squadron, Boscombe Down	Improvements to RN aircraft.
1955	806 Squadron	Pioneering the Sea Hawk at sea, and for contributions to tactical investigation in night strike role.
1956	Search and Rescue Flight, RNAS Lossiemouth. Lieut. R.H. Williams, C.P.O. A. Japp	Search and Rescue Flight. Crew of a wrecked Norwegian vessel (SS Dovrefjell) off the Pentland Firth, Scotland rescued, by two R.N Westland Dragonfly helicopter crews. 3 February 1955.
1957	Not awarded	-
1958	845 Squadron	Operations in the Persian Gulf, and salvage of SS Melika.
1959	781 Squadron	Efficiency in communication flights.
1960	831 Squadron	Efficiency in training with the fleet.
1961	HMS Protector's Flight	Efficiency in Antarctica.
1962	815 Squadron	Bringing the Wessex HAS.1 into service, pioneering night and all-weather ASW tactics and Wessex SAR procedures.
1963	846 Squadron	Operations in Borneo.
1964	845 Squadron	Services in defence of Malaysia.
1965	759 Squadron	Converting Jet Provost pilots to Hunter aircraft.
1966	No. 849C Flight	Outstanding Performance in HMS Ark Royal during Mozambique patrol.
1967	801 Squadron	Bringing the Buccaneer S.2 into service.
1968	814 Squadron	Bringing the Wessex HAS.3 to a high state of operational effectiveness at sea.
1969	Lt.Cdr. P.C. Marshall, AFC	Exceptional skill and personal courage in bringing a badly damaged Phantom safely back to base.
1970	Lt.Cdr. V. Sirrett	The work of 700S Squadron, the Sea King Intensive Flying Trials Unit (IFTU).
1971	826 Squadron, HMS Eagle	Rescue of crew from SS Steel Vendor. In bad weather, two Sea King helicopters took off the crew of 40.
1972	Lt.Cdr. Davis; Lt. C.D. Walkinshaw; Lt. Park; Lt. Lucas	Flying 2,800 miles from HMS Ark Royal to Belize. The operation involved two Buccaneers flown in a show of strength to deter Guatemala from invading British Honduras as it was then known.
1973	Not awarded	-
1974	Lt. I. McKechnie, HMS Andromeda Flight	Evacuation of refugees from Cyprus.
1975	Not awarded	-
1976	Lt.Cdr. K.M.C. Simmons; Lt. T.J. MacMahon; Lt. A.B. Ross; CPO ACM E.A. Butler; HMS Antrim Flight	Rescue off Iceland.
1977	700L Squadron, the Lynx IFTU	Introducing the Lynx into Naval service.
1978	Aircrews of Culdrose squadrons	Outstanding record of rescues, medical and humanitarian flights during the year.
1979	HMS Fife Flight	Outstanding performance in Dominica, following the devastation caused by Hurricane David.
1980	Not awarded.	-
1981	801 Squadron	Outstanding achievements in operating the Sea Harrier, embarked in HMS Invincible.
1982	Cdr. T.J.H. Gedge	Leadership on the ground and in the air, perseverance, skill, professional knowledge and control.
1983	705 Squadron	Excellent overall performance, training achievement, outstanding airmanship and exceptional contribution to the prestige of Naval Aviation.
1984	846 Squadron	Operations off Lebanon during the Lebanese civil war.
1985	815 Squadron, HMS Beaver Flight, No. 244 Flight	CASEVAC of two casualties from the Japanese freighter REEFER DOLPHIN 400 miles southwest of Lands End in the early hours of 7 October. Recovery of the casualties was carried at night in heavy seas and high winds caused by the tail end of Hurricane Gloria.
1986	849 Squadron	
1987	Not awarded.	
1988	815 Squadron, 829 Squadron	
1989	815 Squadron, HMS Alacrity Flight, No. 233 Flight	
1990	829 Squadron, HMS Sheffield Flight, No. 234 Flight	
1991	845 Squadron	
1992	771 Squadron	
1993	845 Squadron	
