= HMS Puma =

1957 Type 41 or Leopard-class frigate of the Royal Navy

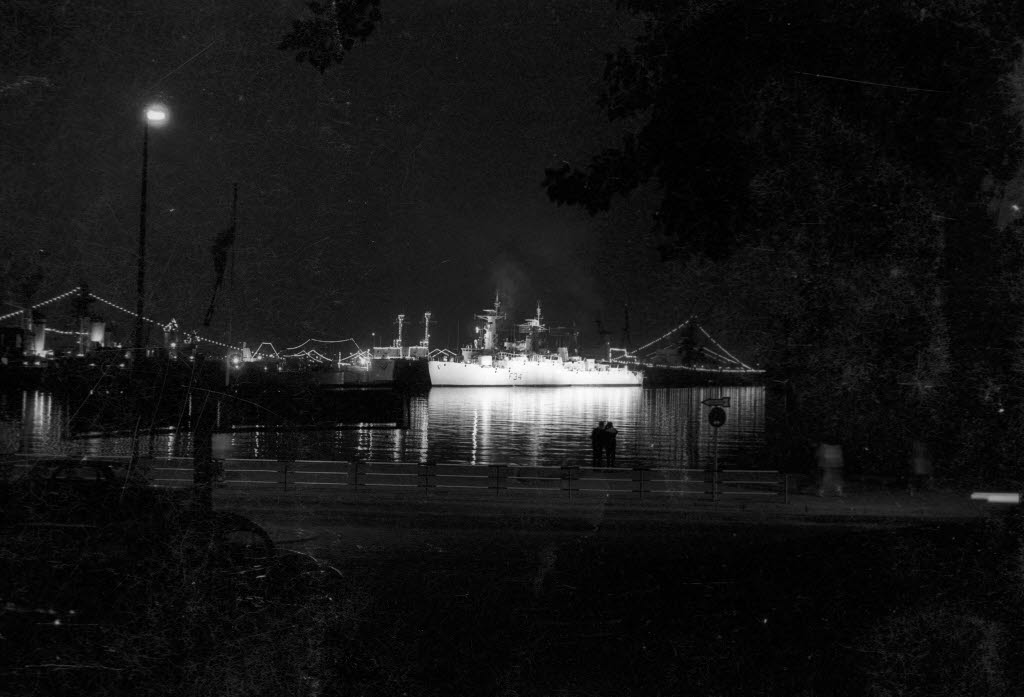
- HMS Puma (F34) at night in Kiel harbour, Germany

History

United Kingdom
- Name: HMS Puma (F34)
- Ordered: 28 June 1951
- Builder: Scotts Shipbuilding and Engineering Co Ltd
- Laid down: 16 November 1953
- Launched: 30 June 1954
- Commissioned: 27 April 1957
- Decommissioned: 1972
- Fate: Scrapped 1976

General characteristics
- Class & type: Leopard-class frigate
- Length: 101 metres (331 ft)
- Beam: 10.6 metres (35 ft)
- Draught: 3 metres (9.8 ft)
- Propulsion: 8 Mirrlees Blackstone K range Diesels 16 vee Cylinders with 4 turbochargers each engine, power output at max HP 4128 at 450 RPM total 33024 HP
- Speed: 18 knots (33 km/h; 21 mph)
- Range: 2,200 miles (3,500 km) at 18 kts
- Complement: 200 (22 officers)
- Sensors & processing systems: Radar System: Surface/Air search: Type 960; Air search: Type 965 AKE-1; Type 293/993 target indication radar; Navigation: Type 974 /978; Fire control: Type 275 on director Mark 6M; Sonar system: Type 174 search sonar; Type 164 attack sonar
- Armament: 2 × twin 4.5 in guns Mark 6; 1 × twin 40 mm Bofors gun STAAG Mark 2 (Removed); 1 × single 40 mm Bofors gun Mark 9 (Replacement for the STAGG); 1 × Squid A/S mortar

HMS Puma (F34), was a Leopard-class anti-aircraft frigate of the Royal Navy, named after the puma (Puma concolor). Envisioned in late World War II, the class was designed to provide anti-aircraft escort to convoys and light fleet aircraft carriers and to act as light destroyers on detached duties.

== Armament ==
Puma was fitted with four QF Mark VI 4.5 guns in two unarmoured twin turrets for anti-aircraft and surface use with remote power control where the guns train and elevate the target following the director. The rate was 24 rounds per minute when power-loaded and 12-18 (in burst mode), when hand-loaded.

Anti-submarine armament was a Squid mortar. Defence against aircraft was initially provided by a STAAG (Stabilised Tachymetric Anti-Aircraft Gun), consisting of twin Bofors 40 mm L/60 guns, and a fire control system, in a stabilised, powered-operated mounting. This weapons system was ahead of the limits of technology at the time, was overweight and complex. Ultimately STAAG would be replaced by a single Bofors 40 mm gun on a Mark 9 mount.

== Operational service ==
In 1958 Puma began her third commission from Portland. During this commission, she visited ports in Europe, Africa and South America as well as Diego Suarez. Between 1958 and 1960 she was commanded by Richard Clayton. She was paid off at Plymouth in 1961. During this commission, she took part in naval exercises and served on the Iceland Patrol. In October 1962, Puma visited Tristan da Cunha, to help to prepare the island for the return of its residents, who had been evacuated as a result of the eruption of the volcano Queen Mary's Peak in 1961. Puma struck a submerged rock while off Tristan da Cuhna, damaging her port propeller, which resulted in the ship being docked down in Cape Town and then in Gibraltar for permanent repairs.

A major refit of Puma took place in Portsmouth Dockyard between 1963 and 1964 and the ship eventually re-commissioned for service in 1965, where she spent the year touring the UK recruiting. In 1966 she sailed for a foreign leg of her commission travelling to West and South Africa, as well as the South Atlantic, and South America, before returning to Plymouth in 1967. She was in refit from early 1967 for a few months before undertaking a round the world deployment taking in South Africa, Singapore, Hong Kong and Australia before visiting San Francisco and Monterey then transiting the Panama Canal to head back across the Atlantic to the UK. In 1971 she undertook a Fishery Protection patrol in the Arctic and Barents Seas, using the northern Norwegian town of Honningsvag as a base, before paying off in Chatham in early 1972. Her badge is still on display at the Selborne dry dock wall.

== Publications ==
- Colledge, J. J.; Warlow, Ben (2006) [1969]. Ships of the Royal Navy: The Complete Record of All Fighting Ships of the Royal Navy from the 15th Century to the Present (3rd Rev ed.). London: Chatham Publishing. ISBN 978-1-86176-281-8. OCLC 67375475.
- Critchley, Mike (1992). British Warships Since 1945: Part 5: Frigates. Liskeard, UK: Maritime Press. ISBN 0-907771-13-0.
- Friedman, Norman (2008). British Destroyers & Frigates: The Second World War and After. Barnsley, UK: Seaforth Publishing. ISBN 978-1-84832-015-4.
- Marriott, Leo (1983). Royal Navy Frigates 1945–1983. Shepperton, Surrey, UK: Ian Allan Ltd. ISBN 0-7110-1322-5.
