= Lydonia =

Lydonia may refer to:

== Ships ==
- Lyndonia (1920)
- USS Lydonia (SP-700), a United States Navy patrol vessel in commission from 1917 to 1919
- USS Lyndonia (SP-734), a survey ship in service with the United States Coast and Geodetic Survey from 1919 to 1947

== Other uses ==
Lydonia (genus), a fossil genus of animals
