= Duludao-class dispatch boat =

Chinese naval auxiliary ship class

History

PRC
- Status: Active

General characteristics
- Class & type: Duludao class
- Type: Dispatch boat
- Sensors & processing systems: Navigation radar
- Electronic warfare & decoys: None
- Armament: Unarmed
- Aircraft carried: None
- Aviation facilities: None

Duludao class dispatch boat is a class of little known naval auxiliary ship currently in service with the People's Liberation Army Navy (PLAN). The exact type still remains unknown, but it has received the NATO reporting name Duludao class. Of approximately more than a dozen units commissioned, many of them have been decommissioned since mid 2010s.

Ships of this class in PLAN service are designated by a combination of two Chinese characters followed by s two-digit number. The second Chinese character is Jiao (交), short for Jiao-Tong-Ting (交通艇), meaning dispatch boat (ferry) in Chinese, because these ships are classified as dispatch boats. The first Chinese character denotes which fleet the ship is service with, with East (Dong, 东) for East Sea Fleet, North (Bei, 北) for North Sea Fleet, and South (Nan, 南) for South Sea Fleet. However, the pennant numbers are subject to change due to changes of Chinese naval ships naming convention, or when units are transferred to different fleets.

Type	NATO designation	Pennant No.	Name (English)	Name (Han 中文)	Commissioned	Displacement	Fleet	Status
Duludao class dispatch boat (YFL)	Duludao class	Bei-Jiao 74	North Traffic 74	北交 74	?	? t	North Sea Fleet	Active
Duludao class dispatch boat (YFL)	Duludao class	Dong-Jiao 92	East Traffic 92	东交 92	?	? t	East Sea Fleet	Active
Duludao class dispatch boat (YFL)	Duludao class	Dong-Jiao 93	East Traffic 93	东交 93	?	? t	East Sea Fleet	Active
Duludao class dispatch boat (YFL)	Duludao class	Nan-Jiao 92	South Traffic 92	南交 92	?	? t	South Sea Fleet	Active
Duludao class dispatch boat (YFL)	Duludao class	Bei-Jiao 57	North Traffic 57	北交 57	?	? t	North Sea Fleet	Retired
Duludao class dispatch boat (YFL)	Duludao class	Bei-Jiao 59	North Traffic 59	北交 59	?	? t	North Sea Fleet	Retired
Duludao class dispatch boat (YFL)	Duludao class	Bei-Jiao 60	North Traffic 60	北交 60	?	? t	North Sea Fleet	Retired
Duludao class dispatch boat (YFL)	Duludao class	Bei-Jiao 69	North Traffic 69	北交 69	?	? t	North Sea Fleet	Retired
Duludao class dispatch boat (YFL)	Duludao class	Bei-Jiao 72	North Traffic 72	北交 72	?	? t	North Sea Fleet	Retired
Duludao class dispatch boat (YFL)	Duludao class	Dong-Jiao 83	East Traffic 83	东交 83	?	? t	East Sea Fleet	Retired
Duludao class dispatch boat (YFL)	Duludao class	Dong-Jiao 89	East Traffic 89	东交 89	?	? t	East Sea Fleet	Retired
Duludao class dispatch boat (YFL)	Duludao class	Dong-Jiao 91	East Traffic 5	东交 91	?	? t	East Sea Fleet	Retired
Duludao class dispatch boat (YFL)	Duludao class	Nan-Jiao 84	South Traffic 84	东交 84	?	? t	South Sea Fleet	Retired
Duludao class dispatch boat (YFL)	Duludao class	Nan-Jiao 89	South Traffic 89	东交 89	?	? t	South Sea Fleet	Retired
