= Dumuju-class dispatch boat =

People's Liberation Army Navy vessel

History

PRC
- Status: Active

General characteristics
- Class & type: Dumuju class
- Type: Dispatch boat
- Sensors & processing systems: Navigation radar
- Electronic warfare & decoys: None
- Armament: Unarmed
- Aircraft carried: None
- Aviation facilities: None

The Dumuju class is a class of dispatch boat (YFL) currently in service with the People's Liberation Army Navy (PLAN). The exact type still remains unknown, and it has received NATO reporting name Dumuju class, with only a single unit of this class have been confirmed in active service as of mid-2010s.

Ships of this class in PLAN service are designated by a combination of two Chinese characters followed by three-digit number. The second Chinese character is Jiao (交), short for Jiao-Tong-Ting (交通艇), meaning dispatch boat (ferry) in Chinese, because these ships are classified as dispatch boats. The first Chinese character denotes which fleet the ship is service with, with East (Dong, 东) for East Sea Fleet, North (Bei, 北) for North Sea Fleet, and South (Nan, 南) for South Sea Fleet. However, the pennant numbers are subject to change due to changes of Chinese naval ships naming convention, or when units are transferred to different fleets.

Type	NATO designation	Pennant No.	Name (English)	Name (Han 中文)	Commissioned	Displacement	Fleet	Status
Dumuju class dispatch boat (YFL)	Dumuju class	Bei-Jiao 77	North Traffic 77	北交 77	?	? t	North Sea Fleet	Active
