= 728C Naval Air Squadron =

Inactive flying squadron of the Royal Navy's Fleet Air Arm

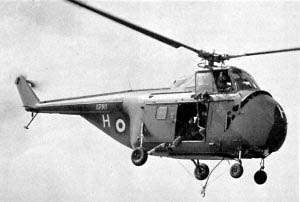
- A Royal Navy Westland Whirlwind of the type used by 728C NAS
- Active: 7 January - 13 October 1958
- Country: United Kingdom
- Branch: Royal Navy
- Type: Fleet Air Arm Second Line Squadron
- Role: Amphibious Warfare Trials Unit
- Size: Squadron
- Part of: Fleet Air Arm
- Home station: See Naval air stations section for full list.

Insignia
- Identification Markings: 621-624

Aircraft flown
- Multirole helicopter: Westland Whirlwind

728C Naval Air Squadron (728C NAS), sometimes called 728C Squadron, is an inactive Fleet Air Arm (FAA) naval air squadron of the United Kingdom’s Royal Navy (RN). It was operational between January and October 1958 as the Amphibious Warfare Trials Unit. Equipped with four Westland Whirlwind HAS.22 anti-submarine helicopters, the squadron operated around the Mediterranean Basin before it was redesignated 848 Naval Air Squadron on achieving first line status.

== History ==
=== Amphibious Warfare Trials Unit (1958) ===
728C Naval Air Squadron formed on 7 January 1958 at RNAS Lee-on-Solent (HMS Daedalus) as the Amphibious Warfare Trials Unit. It was equipped with four Westland Whirlwind HAS.22, an anti-submarine warfare variant of the helicopter. The squadron was tasked with establishing proficiency in ship to shore deployment of Royal Marines.

The helicopters were embarked in HMS Eagle and HMS Ark Royal for transit to Malta and on arrival set up headquarters at RNAS Hal Far (HMS Falcon). During April the squadron embarked in the landing ship HMS Striker (L128) for Tripoli, Libya, returned in HMS Ark Royal to RNAS Hal Far, then re-embarked for Sardinia, returning to Malta in HMS Striker.

It next embarked for RAF Nicosia, Cyprus, in June. The helicopters were carried as deck cargo in HMS Bermuda, for operations with 45 Commando Royal Marines. The squadron returned to RNAS Hal Far during July.

August saw 728C Naval Air Squadron carry out trials with HMS Surprise and in September a detachment was deployed to Libya. By the beginning of October the squadron was back at RNAS Hal Far, before becoming 848 Naval Air Squadron on 13 October.

== Aircraft flown ==
The squadron operated a single helicopter type:

- Westland Whirlwind HAS.22 anti-submarine warfare helicopter (January - October 1958)

== Naval air stations and aircraft carriers ==
728C Naval Air Squadron operated from a number of naval air stations of the Royal Navy, both in the UK and overseas, a number of Royal Navy aircraft carriers and other warships and other air bases:

- Royal Naval Air Station Lee-on-Solent (HMS Daedalus), Hampshire, (7 - 24 January 1958)
- HMS Eagle / HMS Ark Royal - transit - (24 January - 7 February 1958)
- Royal Naval Air Station Hal Far (HMS Falcon), Malta, (7 February - 7 April 1958)
- HMS Striker (7 - 8 April 1958)
- Tarhuna Tripoli, Libya, (8 - 15 April 1958)
- HMS Ark Royal (15 - 17 April 1958)
- Royal Naval Air Station Hal Far (HMS Falcon), Malta, (17 - 21 April 1958)
- HMS Ark Royal (21 - 24 April 1958)
- Sardinia (24 - 28 April 1958)
- HMS Striker (28 - 30 April 1958)
- Royal Naval Air Station Hal Far (HMS Falcon), Malta, (30 April - 16 June 1958)
- HMS Bermuda (16 - 21 June 1958)
- Royal Air Force Nicosia, Cyprus, (21 June - 20 July 1958)
- HMS Reggio (20 - 26 July 1958)
- Royal Naval Air Station Hal Far (HMS Falcon), Malta, (26 July - 13 October 1958)
  - HMS Surprise (Detachment three helicopters 6 August 1958)
  - HMS Ceylon (Detachment two helicopters 3 - 4 September 1958)
  - El Adem, Libya, (Detachment two helicopters 4 September - 7 October 1958)
  - HMS Ceylon (Detachment two helicopters 7 - 8 October 1958)
- became 848 Naval Air Squadron (13 October 1958)

== Commanding Officers ==
List of commanding officers of 728C Naval Air Squadron, with date of appointment:

- Lieutenant Commander G.C.J. Knight, DFC, RN, from 7 January 1958
- disbanded - 13 October 1958
