= Duzhou-class dispatch boat =

Chinese naval auxiliary ship class

History

PRC
- Status: Active

General characteristics
- Class & type: Duzhou class
- Type: Dispatch boat
- Sensors & processing systems: Navigation radar
- Electronic warfare & decoys: None
- Armament: Unarmed
- Aircraft carried: None
- Aviation facilities: None

Duzhou class dispatch boat (YFL) is a class of naval auxiliary ship currently in service with the People's Liberation Army Navy (PLAN), and has received NATO reporting name Duzhou class (渡舟 in Chinese, meaning Ferry Ship), with the exact type still remains unknown, and only a single unit of this class have been confirmed in active service as of mid-2010s.

Ships of this class in PLAN service are designated by a combination of two Chinese characters followed by a two-digit number. The second Chinese character is Jiao (交), short for Jiao-Tong-Ting (交通艇), meaning dispatch boat (ferry) in Chinese, because these ships are classified as dispatch boats. The first Chinese character denotes which fleet the ship is in service with, with East (Dong, 东) for East Sea Fleet, North (Bei, 北) for North Sea Fleet, and South (Nan, 南) for South Sea Fleet. However, the pennant numbers are subject to change due to changes of Chinese naval ships naming convention, or when units are transferred to different fleets.

Type	NATO designation	Pennant No.	Name (English)	Name (Han 中文)	Commissioned	Displacement	Fleet	Status
Duzhou class dispatch boat (YFL)	Duzhou class	Dong-Jiao 82	East Traffic 82	东交 82	?	? t	East Sea Fleet	Active
