= Beijiao 39-class dispatch boat =

Chinese naval auxiliary ship class

History

PRC

General characteristics
- Class & type: Beijiao 39
- Electronic warfare & decoys: None
- Armament: Unarmed
- Aircraft carried: None
- Aviation facilities: None

The Beijiao 39 class dispatch boat is a class of little known naval auxiliary ship currently in service with the People's Liberation Army Navy (PLAN).

The name of this class is after the first unit commissioned, with the exact type still remains unknown, and only a single unit of this class have been confirmed in active service as of mid-2010s. Beijiao 39 has a latticework mast structure that no other dispatch boats in Chinese navy adopts.

Beijiao 39 class series ships in PLAN service are designated by a combination of two Chinese characters followed by three-digit number. The second Chinese character is Jiao (交), short for Jiao-Tong-Ting (交通艇), meaning dispatch boat (ferry) in Chinese, because these ships are classified as dispatch boats. The first Chinese character denotes which fleet the ship is service with, with East (Dong, 东) for East Sea Fleet, North (Bei, 北) for North Sea Fleet, and South (Nan, 南) for South Sea Fleet. However, the pennant numbers may have changed due to the change of Chinese naval ships naming convention.

Class	Pennant #	Status	Fleet
Beijiao 39 class	Bei-Jiao 39	Active	North Sea Fleet
