= Duchuan-class dispatch boat =

Chinese naval auxiliary ship

Class overview
- Operators: People's Liberation Army Navy

General characteristics
- Class & type: Duchuan class
- Type: Dispatch boat
- Electronic warfare & decoys: None
- Armament: None
- Aircraft carried: None
- Aviation facilities: None

Duchuan class dispatch boat (YFL) is a class of little known naval auxiliary ship currently in service with the Chinese People's Liberation Army Navy (PLAN), With the exact type still remains unknown, it has received the NATO reporting name Duchuan class, or 渡船 in Chinese, meaning Ferry Boat. A total of three units of this class have been confirmed in active service as of 2022.

Ships of this class in PLAN service are designated by a combination of two Chinese characters followed by a two-digit number. The second Chinese character is Jiao (交), short for Jiao-Tong-Ting (交通艇), meaning dispatch boat (ferry) in Chinese, because these ships are classified as dispatch boats. The first Chinese character denotes which fleet the ship is service with, with East (Dong, 东) for East Sea Fleet, North (Bei, 北) for North Sea Fleet, and South (Nan, 南) for South Sea Fleet. However, the pennant numbers are subject to change due to changes of Chinese naval ships naming convention, or when units are transferred to different fleets. Specification:

- Length: 57 meter

Type	NATO designation	Pennant No.	Name (English)	Name (Han 中文)	Commissioned	Displacement	Fleet	Status
Duchuan class dispatch boat (YFL)	Duchuan class	Bei-Jiao 72	North Traffic 72	北交 72	?	? t	North Sea Fleet	Active
Duchuan class dispatch boat (YFL)	Duchuan class	Nan-Jiao 83	South Traffic 83	南交 83	?	? t	South Sea Fleet	Active
Duchuan class dispatch boat (YFL)	Duchuan class	Nan-Jiao 89	South Traffic 89	南交 89	?	? t	South Sea Fleet	Active
