= Dongjiao 03-class dispatch boat =

Chinese naval auxiliary ship

History

PRC

General characteristics
- Class & type: Dongjiao 03
- Electronic warfare & decoys: None
- Armament: Unarmed
- Aircraft carried: None
- Aviation facilities: None

Dongjiao 03 class dispatch boat is a class of little known naval auxiliary ship currently in service with the People's Liberation Army Navy (PLAN). The name of this class is after the first unit commissioned, with the exact type still remains unknown, and only a single unit of this class have been confirmed in active service as of mid-2010s.

Dongjiao 03 class series ships in PLAN service are designated by a combination of two Chinese characters followed by three-digit number. The second Chinese character is Jiao (交), short for Jiao-Tong-Ting (交通艇), meaning dispatch boat (ferry) in Chinese, because these ships are classified as dispatch boats. The first Chinese character denotes which fleet the ship is service with, with East (Dong, 东) for East Sea Fleet, North (Bei, 北) for North Sea Fleet, and South (Nan, 南) for South Sea Fleet. However, the pennant numbers may have changed due to the change of Chinese naval ships naming convention.

Class	Pennant #	Status	Fleet
Dong jiao 03 class	Dong -Jiao 03	Active	East Sea Fleet
