= Dukou-class dispatch boat =

Class of Chinese naval vessel

History

PRC
- Status: Active

General characteristics
- Class & type: Dukou
- Type: Dispatch boat (YFL)
- Propulsion: Marine Diesel
- Sensors & processing systems: Navigation radar

The Dukou class is a class of little known dispatch boat (YFL) built in the People's Republic of China (PRC) for the People's Liberation Army Navy (PLAN). The exact domestic Chinese type designation remain unknown, and this class is identified by its NATO reporting name Dukou class, or 渡口 in Chinese, meaning Crossing Wharf. The Dukou class in PLAN service is designated by a combination of two Chinese characters followed by a two-digit number. The second Chinese character is Jiao (交), short for Jiao-Tong-Ting (交通艇), meaning dispatch boat (ferry) in Chinese, because these ships are classified as dispatch boats. The first Chinese character denotes which fleet the ship is service with, with East (Dong, 东) for East Sea Fleet, North (Bei, 北) for North Sea Fleet, and South (Nan, 南) for South Sea Fleet. However, the pennant numbers are subject to change due to the change of Chinese naval ships naming convention, or when units are transferred to different fleets. As of mid 2010s, a total of five ships have been identified:

Type	NATO designation	Pennant No.	Name (English)	Name (Han 中文)	Commissioned	Displacement	Fleet	Status
Dukou-class dispatch boat (YFL)	Dukou class	Bei-Jiao 90	North Traffic 90	北交90	?	? t	North Sea Fleet	Active
Dukou-class dispatch boat (YFL)	Dukou class	Dong-Jiao 87	East Traffic 87	东交87	?	? t	East Sea Fleet	Active
Dukou-class dispatch boat (YFL)	Dukou class	Dong-Jiao 88	East Traffic 88	东交88	?	? t	East Sea Fleet	Active
Dukou-class dispatch boat (YFL)	Dukou class	Nan-Jiao 85	South Traffic 85	南交85	?	? t	South Sea Fleet	Active
Dukou-class dispatch boat (YFL)	Dukou class	Nan-Jiao 86	South Traffic 86	南交86	?	? t	South Sea Fleet	Active
