= Dufei-class dispatch boat =

Chinese army boat

History

PRC
- Status: Active

General characteristics
- Class & type: Dufei class
- Type: Dispatch boat (YFL)
- Propulsion: Marine Diesel
- Sensors & processing systems: Navigation radar
- Electronic warfare & decoys: None
- Armament: Unarmed
- Armour: None
- Aircraft carried: None
- Aviation facilities: None

Dufei class dispatch boat is a class of dispatch boat (YFL) built in the People’s Republic of China (PRC) for the People's Liberation Army Navy (PLAN). The exact domestic Chinese type designation remains unknown, and this class is identified by its NATO reporting name Dufei class, or 渡费 in Chinese, meaning Crossing Toll.

Dufei in PLAN service is designated by a combination of two Chinese characters followed by a two-digit number. The second Chinese character is Jiao (交), short for Jiao-Tong-Ting (交通艇), meaning dispatch boat (ferry) in Chinese. The first Chinese character denotes which fleet the ship is in service with, with East (Dong, 东) for East Sea Fleet, North (Bei, 北) for North Sea Fleet, and South (Nan, 南) for South Sea Fleet. However, the pennant numbers are subject to change due to the changes in Chinese naval ships naming conventions, or when units are transferred to different fleets.

As of 2022, only a single unit has been positively identified, which is of length 57 meters:.

Type	NATO designation	Pennant No.	Name (English)	Name (Han 中文)	Commissioned	Displacement	Fleet	Status
Dufei-class dispatch boat (YFL)	Dufei class	Bei-Jiao 88	North Traffic 88	北交 88	?	? t	North Sea Fleet	Active
