= Beijiao 75-class dispatch boat =

Chinese naval auxiliary ship class

History

PRC

General characteristics
- Class & type: Beijiao 75
- Electronic warfare & decoys: None
- Armament: Unarmed
- Aircraft carried: None
- Aviation facilities: None

Beijiao 75 class dispatch boat is a class of little known naval auxiliary ship currently in service with the People's Liberation Army Navy (PLAN). The name of this class is after the first unit commissioned, with the exact type still remains unknown, and a total of three units of this class have been confirmed in active service as of mid-2010s.

Beijiao 75 class series ships in PLAN service are designated by a combination of two Chinese characters followed by three-digit number. The second Chinese character is Jiao (交), short for Jiao-Tong-Ting (交通艇), meaning dispatch boat (ferry) in Chinese, because these ships are classified as dispatch boats. The first Chinese character denotes which fleet the ship is service with, with East (Dong, 东) for East Sea Fleet, North (Bei, 北) for North Sea Fleet, and South (Nan, 南) for South Sea Fleet. However, the pennant numbers may have changed due to the change of Chinese naval ships naming convention.

| Class | Pennant # | Status | Fleet |
|---|---|---|---|
| Beijiao 75 class | Bei-Jiao 75 | Active | North Sea Fleet |
| Beijiao 75 class | Dong-Jiao 93 | Active | East Sea Fleet |
| Beijiao 75 class | Nan-Jiao 92 | Active | South Sea Fleet |
