= Brian Paterson (Royal Navy officer) =

British flying ace

- Born: 21 March 1919
- Died: 12 July 2004 (aged 85)
- Military career
- Allegiance: United Kingdom
- Branch: Royal Navy (Fleet Air Arm)
- Rank: Lieutenant-Commander
- Nickname: "Blinkers"
- Conflicts: Second World War: Norway campaign; Battle of Britain; Battle of the Atlantic; Malayan Emergency
- Awards: Member of the Order of the British Empire; Distinguished Flying Cross; Mentioned in Despatches

Lieutenant-Commander Brian "Blinkers" Paterson, MBE, DFC (21 March 1919 – 12 July 2004) was a Battle of Britain Fleet Air Arm pilot and one of "The Few".

== Early life ==
Paterson was born 21 March 1919 and educated at St. Lawrence College, Ramsgate. After leaving school, he worked with the insurance brokers Willis Faber and Dumas on the floor of Lloyd's in Fenchurch Street. In 1936 he joined the Royal Air Force Volunteer Reserve and learned to fly in a de Havilland Tiger Moth at the training school at White Waltham Airfield before being posted to No. 46 Squadron at RAF Digby. In 1938 Paterson transferred to the Royal Navy.

== Second World War ==
In November 1939 Paterson, known as "Blinkers" in the Fleet Air Arm, helped to form No. 804 Royal Naval Air Squadron, flying Gloster Sea Gladiators from RNAS Hatston, on Orkney. The squadron fought during the Norway campaign and returned to Britain in the carrier HMS Glorious not long before she was sunk by the German battleships Scharnhorst and Gneisenau.

In autumn 1940 Sub Lt. Paterson was one of more than 50 Fleet Air Arm pilots loaned to the RAF for the Battle of Britain, and posted to the north.

In 1941, after converting to the Hawker Hurricat, he was sent to join the fighter catapult ship HMS Springbank. The Hurricat was a specially modified Hurricane launched from a catapult and intended to defend convoys from air threat; to save weight it was stripped of its undercarriage and, after chasing off enemy bombers, the pilot had to ditch in the sea, where he was hopefully picked up by ship. On 27 September 1941 Springbank was torpedoed by the German submarine U-201 while escorting convoy HG 73 in the Atlantic. Many lives were lost and Paterson swam to the corvette HMS Jasmine. He then flew Sea Hurricanes from HMS Victorious, one of three carriers which accompanied the convoy to Malta in Operation Pedestal in August 1942.

Paterson and his comrades flew three and four sorties a day, and losses to pilot fatigue, friendly fire and enemy action reduced No. 885 RNAS to three serviceable aircraft on the second day. That afternoon, while chasing three bombers of an incoming raid, Paterson was jumped by enemy fighters which he evaded by diving to 500 ft into the protection of a destroyer's anti-aircraft fire. In November 1942, Paterson was mentioned in dispatches.

On 27 March 1943 off the Clyde, Paterson was serving in the escort carrier HMS Dasher when she was lost: she had finished flying for the day and aircraft were being refuelled when spilt aviation fuel exploded. Paterson, who was in the bow of the ship, the only area unaffected by the inferno, jumped into the freezing sea where the leaking fuel also caught fire. He managed to swim to a rescuing destroyer.

== Postwar period ==
After the war Paterson converted to helicopters. He also played an important part in rescue operations after the Greek earthquake disaster of August 1953. Paterson had not waited for official approval and he loaded two Dragonfly helicopters on to the cruiser HMS Bermuda at Malta. For three weeks Paterson ran relief work around Zakinthos, flying food and medical supplies, evacuating the injured and organising a non-stop airlift between ship and shore. In recognition of his "distinguished service in the Greek earthquake relief operations", Paterson was made a Member of the Order of the British Empire.

He became commanding officer of No. 848 RNAS during the Malayan Emergency in 1954. Flying the Sikorsky S-55, the Squadron helped to pioneer the technique and tactics of troop lift, thereby giving much needed flexibility to land operations. By December that year, 848 had lifted 41,000 troops and more than 750,000 lb of freight. Paterson was awarded the Distinguished Flying Cross "for distinguished service with No. 848 Royal Naval Air Squadron in operations in Malaya".

Considered an able and conscientious staff officer who would have done well in the higher ranks, he retired from the Navy in 1959 after flying more than 2,000 hours in 20 types of aircraft.

== Later life ==
He tried a career in film-making and was technical adviser on the set of Operation Amsterdam, starring Peter Finch; he became landlord of the Horse and Groom at Polegate, Sussex, and in 1970 successfully took over a company making metal and plastic labels. He died on 12 July 2004, aged 85.
