= RAF Hal Far =

Former British RAF station in Malta

RAF Hal Far HMS Falcon
- South Eastern District, Southern Region in Malta
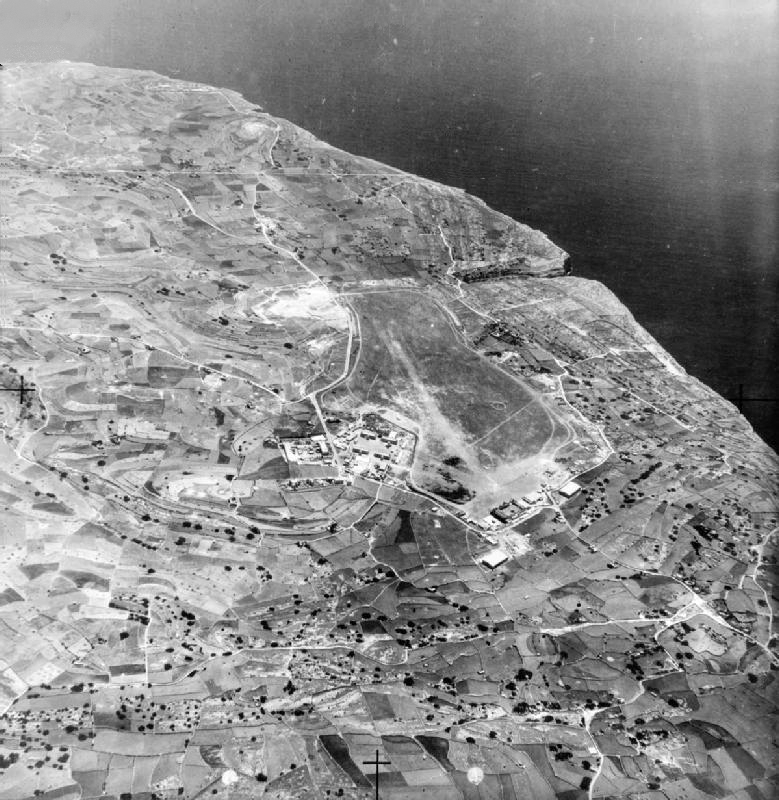
- RAF Hal Far, 1941

Site information
- Owner: Ministry of Defence
- Operator: Royal Air Force; Royal Navy
- Controlled by: Fleet Air Arm

Location
- Shown within Malta
- Coordinates: 35°48′59″N 14°30′29″E

Site history
- Built: 1923
- In use: 1929–1946 (RAF); 1946–1965 (RN Control); 1965–1967 (RAF)

Airfield information
Runways
Direction	Length and surface
09/27	1,500 metres (4,921 ft) Concrete
13/31	1,800 metres (5,906 ft) Concrete

Royal Air Force Hal Far or more commonly RAF Hal Far is a former Royal Air Force station which was the first permanent airfield to be built on Malta. It was operated by the RAF from 1 April 1929 until 1946 when it was transferred and renamed to HMS Falcon, a Royal Navy stone frigate, and was used by Fleet Air Arm crews. It was transferred back to the RAF on 1 September 1965 and returned to the Maltese Government and redeveloped from January 1979. It is now closed and one of its runways is used by drag racing enthusiasts. The second runway is now a road leading to an industrial estate which was developed recently. The Maltese fire service, the CPD occupy the newer building with the glass control tower on the roof. The old Royal Naval Air Station building is now occupied by the International Safety Training College who utilise part of the runway for firefighting training.

== Facilities ==
This airfield consisted of two runways, namely Runway 13/31 which was 6,000 feet (1,800 m) long and Runway 9/27, which was 4,800 feet (1,500 m) long. Runway 13/31 was resurfaced between 20 April and 26 May 1959 while the resurfacing of Runway 9/27 was carried out between 12 June and 28 July 1959. Its location on Malta was of great strategic importance in the Mediterranean, since it provided a base for aircraft carrier units en route to the rest of the British Empire. Compared to other airstrips on the island, Hal Far had better approaches over the sea and was the preferred diversionary base. It also provided excellent range facilities, making it the ideal location for armament training by the squadrons.

Hal Far airfield provided various facilities, including an armoury, explosives area, workshops, a compass base and a control tower. It had also a radar test base and a number of hangars. It also included living quarters for H.Q. Staff, Officers and other ranks, and a sick bay, for medical purposes.

== Second World War ==
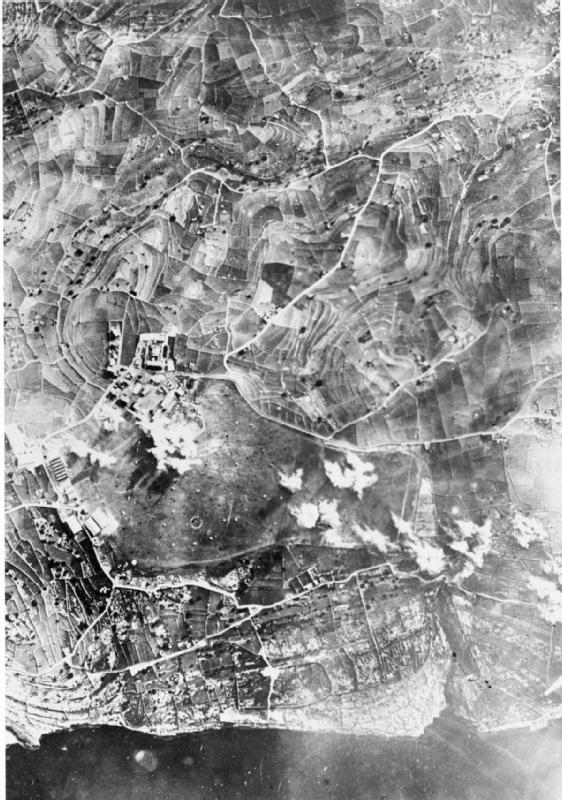
Hal Far under attack, 1941.

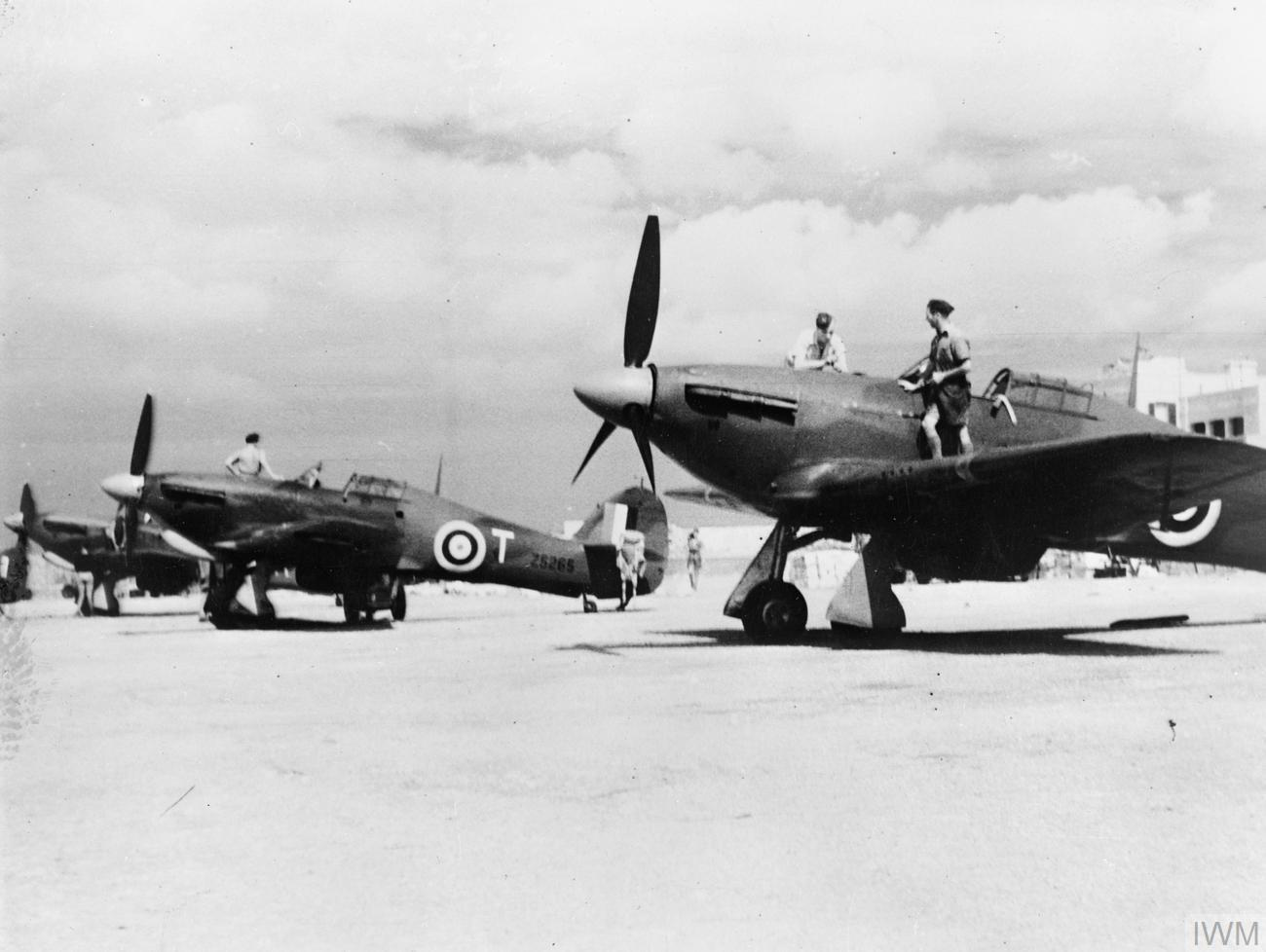
Hawker Hurricane Mk IIBs of No. 185 Squadron at RAF Hal Far, Malta, 1941

During the Second World War, Hal Far airfield was one of the main targets for the Luftwaffe and the Regia Aeronautica and suffered several bombings during the blitz. On July and August 1940 in the beginning of the Siege of Malta, the Italian air-raids managed to damage several squadron aircraft. As the raids intensified during 1942 more damage was inflicted on the airfield and the squadrons, present on the airfield. On one particular attack on Hal Far by Junkers Ju 88s, a Fairey Swordfish was badly damaged. Further raids during January 1942 resulted in the destruction at Hal Far of two other Swordfish and a Blackburn Skua, and damaged 15 Hawker Hurricanes, three other Swordfish and a Fairey Fulmar. Further damage to aircraft, airfield buildings and loss of personnel resulted during attacks in 1942 and 1943, with the last bombing being recorded on 21 May 1943.

Hal Far had been the first Maltese airfield to be bombed on 11 June 1940. During this period, 2,300 tons of bombs were dropped on the airfield, nevertheless it was never made unserviceable, due to the efficiency of the airfield repair parties. On the airfield itself the ground crew casualties numbered 30 killed and 84 injured. Various officers and Maltese civilian employees were awarded the George Cross, George Medal and other awards for their courage and bravery in the face of enemy action. With enemy air raids practically at an end, and as aircraft became heavier and traffic had increased significantly, paved runways and taxiways were added to the airfield, together with the completion of runways 13/31 and 09/27.

== 1944—1945 ==
By 1944 Malta had therefore returned to normal and new aircraft were appearing all over the Island. The influx of large numbers of aircraft needed an expansion of dispersal areas and more huts, an undertaking carried out in October 1944. Further accommodation areas were added when FAA squadrons started arriving regularly at Hal Far for training periods.

A different kind of event occurred in January 1945, when British Prime Minister Winston Churchill and US President Franklin D. Roosevelt came to Malta in anticipation of the Malta Conference with Soviet Premier Joseph Stalin. To deter any possible enemy attack, nine Spitfire IXs of No. 1435 Squadron, and six Mosquito night fighters of No. 256 Squadron, deployed to Hal Far from Grottaglie and Foggia respectively, two of the Mosquitos escorting the Prime Minister's Avro York transport aircraft outside Malta and into Luqa airfield on 29 January. All aircraft remained at Hal Far into early February until all VIPs had left.

== Post war ==
After the evolution from piston to jet engines in the 1950s, the airfield had to be closed for three weeks for the resurfacing of the runways. The airfield started housing various training camps by the UK-based Royal Naval Volunteer Reserve (RNVR) Air Divisions. Training including live depth charges dropping, live armament practice and rocket firing on the uninhabited islet of Filfla, and hide and seek exercises with RN submarines in which aircraft sought out and shadowed the underwater 'raiders' and finally carried out mock attacks if they managed to find them. Several units used HMS Falcon for these annual summer camps, which started in 1950, stopped in 1951, and continued from 1952 to 1956.

During 1957, the airfield also served as a civilian airport while the runways at RAF Luqa were being resurfaced. During 1958 Hal Far was the proving base for the world's first assault helicopter squadron.

After being used by the Royal Navy, the Hal Far airfield was returned to the RAF for a short period of time in the mid 1960s, and the last squadron was disbanded on 31 August 1967. This brought to an end 43 very active years of Malta's oldest and most historical airfield. It was subsequently placed on a 'care and maintenance' basis and served as a satellite for RAF Luqa. Between March 1967 and September 1978 the airfield served as a base for the American aircraft maintenance company M.I.A.Co.

During the resurfacing of Luqa's runways, all civilian and military flying was transferred to Hal Far until Luqa became operational again.

== RAF Squadrons ==
- No. 22 Squadron RAF between 10 October 1935 and 29 August 1936 with the Vildebeeste III
- No. 38 Squadron RAF between 30 October 1965 and 31 March 1967 with the Shackleton MR.2
- No. 43 Squadron RAF between 9 June and 14 July 1943 with the Spitfire VC
- No. 72 Squadron RAF between 10 June and 15 July 1943 with the Spitfire VC
- No. 73 Squadron RAF between 3 July 1945 and 15 July 1946 with the Spitfire IX
- No. 74 Squadron RAF between 11 September 1935 and 21 September 1936 with the Demon
- No. 93 Squadron RAF between 12 June and 14 July 1943 with the Spitfire VC
- No. 108 Squadron RAF between 1 and 26 July 1944 with the Beaufighter VIF
- No. 185 Squadron RAF initially between 12 May 1941 and 5 June 1943 with the Hurricane I, IIA, IIC and the Spitfire VC. Returning for a second time between 23 September 1943 and 29 August 1944 with the Spitfire VC. For a final time between 15 September 1951 and 23 July 1952 with the Vampire FB.5
- No. 208 Squadron RAF between 17 January and 26 March 1956 with the Meteor FR.9
- No. 229 Squadron RAF initially between 28 March and 29 April 1942 with the Hurricane IIC then again between 25 September 1943 and 30 January 1944 with the Spitfire VC & IX
- No. 242 Squadron RAF detachment between 7 January and 17 March 1942 with the Hurricane IIB
- No. 243 Squadron RAF between 11 June and 20 July 1943 with the Spitfire VB & VC
- No. 249 Squadron RAF between 24 September and 23 October 1943 with the Spitfire VB, VC & IX
- No. 250 Squadron RAF between 9 and 13 July 1943 with the Kittyhawk III
- No. 255 Squadron RAF between 4 September 1945 and 31 January 1946 with the Mosquito XIX
- No. 283 Squadron RAF between 6 April 1944 and 31 March 1946 with the Warwick I
- No. 284 Squadron RAF between 17 and 27 July 1943 with the Walrus
- No. 605 Squadron RAF between 7 January and 17 March 1942 with the Hurricane IIB
- No. 624 Squadron RAF detachment between 30 April and 30 November 1945 with the Walrus
- No. 1435 Squadron RAF detachment between 2 July 1944 and 29 April 1945 with the Spitfire IX

== RN squadrons ==
- 728 Naval Air Squadron (Fleet Requirements Unit) between 5 May 1946 and 31 May 1967 with the Baltimore IV & V, Beaufighter X & TT.10, Martinet TT.1, Mosquito B.25, T.3, PR.16 & TT.39, Oxford I, Seafire XV & F.17, Sea Otter 2, Dragonfly HR.3, Expediter C.2, Gannet T.2, Harvard T.3, Heron C.2, Meteor T.7 & TT.20, Sea Devon C.20, Sea Hornet FR.20, Sea Vampire F.20, Sturgeon TT.2 & TT.3, Whirlwind HAR.3 & HAS.22
- 728B Naval Air Squadron (Pilotless Drone Target Unit) between 1 March 1958 and 2 December 1961 with the Firefly U.8 & U.9, Meteor U.15 & U.16 and the Canberra D.14
- 728C Naval Air Squadron (Amphibious Warfare Trials Unit) initially between 7 February and 7 April 1958 and again between 28 April and 16 June 1958. Then finally between 30 July and 13 October 1958 with the Whirlwind HAS.22
- 736B Flight between 20 March and 28 June 1945 with the Seafire III
- 744 Naval Air Squadron detachment between 3 October and 22 November 1951 with the Firefly AS.6
- 750 Naval Air Squadron between 13 October 1959 and 23 June 1965 with the Sea Prince T.1, Sea Venom FAW.21 & FAW.22 & Sea Devon C.20
- 751 Naval Air Squadron (Radio Warfare Unit) detachment between 30 January and 20 February 1956 with the Sea Fury FB.11 & Firefly AS.6 then again as B Flight between 19 February and 20 March 1958 with the Sea Venom ECM.21
- 765 Naval Air Squadron (Travelling Recording Unit) between 6 October 1945 and 30 April 1946 with the Wellington X & XI
- 767 Naval Air Squadron between 22 June and 1 July 1940
- 800 Naval Air Squadron between:
  - 25 January and 4 February 1935 with the Nimrod I & II, Osprey and AW.XVI
  - 15 and 21 December 1935 with the Nimrod I & II, Osprey and AW.XVI
  - 'X' Flight 21 May and 13 November 1941 with the Fulmar I & II
  - 16 February and 5 November 1947 and again between 19 December 1947 and 24 February 1949 with the Seafire F.17
  - 6 May and 30 June 1949 with the Seafire FR.47
  - 15 and 27 April 1954 with the Attacker FB.2
  - 23 October 1955 and 17 February 1956 with the Sea Hawk FGA.4
  - 25 April and 4 May 1957 and again between 9 February and 8 April 1958 with the Sea Hawk FGA.6
  - Det 4 between 4 and 24 November 1960 and again as Det. 6 between 16 December 1961 and 2 January 1962 with the Scimitar F.1
- 801 Naval Air Squadron between:
  - 9 and 26 June 1934 with the Flycatcher I, Nimrod I and Osprey
  - 15 and 28 August 1934 and again between 18 and 21 January 1935 with the Nimrod I and Osprey
  - 24 June and 2 September 1952 and again between 12 November 1953 and 4 January 1954 with the Sea Fury FB.11 & T.20
  - 25 February and 3 March 1959 and again between 13 and 21 June 1959 as Det. 7 with the Sea Hawk FGA.6
- 802 Naval Air Squadron between:
  - Nimrod I & II and the Osprey
    - 27 April and 27 June 1933
    - 23 October 1933 and 23 April 1934
    - 23 December 1935 and 1 January 1936
    - 22 April 1936 and 23 April 1937
    - 23 August and 18 September 1937
    - 7 February 1938 and 25 April 1939
  - 2 December 1939 and 31 March 1940 with Sea Gladiator
  - 11 and 24 November 1947 with the Seafire F.15
  - 4 February and 4 April 1952 and again between 6 and 27 August 1953 with the Sea Fury FB.11 & T.20
  - Det. 6 between 24 June and 18 July 1955 with the Sea Hawk F.2 & FGA.4
  - Det. 4 between 12 and 23 October 1956 and as a squadron between 25 December 1956 and 4 February 1957 with the Sea Hawk FB.3
  - 9 February and 8 April 1958 and again between 23 August and 15 October 1958 and finally between 6 and 20 February 1959 with the Sea Hawk FB.5
- 803 Naval Air Squadron between:
  - 14 April 1954 and 14 February 1955 with the Attacker FB.2 & Sea Hawk FB.3
  - 13 and 28 February 1958 with the Sea Hawk FGA.6
  - Scimitar F.1
    - Det. 2 between 18 and 22 October 1958
    - 8 November and 10 December 1958
    - 5 and 15 November 1960
    - Det. 7 between 12 and 27 June 1962
    - Det. 7 between 5 and 18 September 1962
- 804 Naval Air Squadron between:
  - 14 September 1948 and 8 March 1951 with the Seafire F.47, Firefly 5, Sea Fury FB.11
  - 18 February and 27 April 1953 and again between 6 and 27 August 1953 with the Sea Fury FB.11
  - 7 and 13 March 1955 with the Sea Hawk FGA.4
  - 25 August 1956 and 4 February 1957 and again between 14 and 25 February 1958 with the Sea Hawk FGA.6
- 805 Naval Air Squadron
- 806 Naval Air Squadron
- 807 Naval Air Squadron
- 809 Naval Air Squadron
- 810 Naval Air Squadron
- 811 Naval Air Squadron
- 812 Naval Air Squadron
- 813 Naval Air Squadron
- 814 Naval Air Squadron
- 815 Naval Air Squadron
- 816 Naval Air Squadron
- 819 Naval Air Squadron
- 820 Naval Air Squadron
- 821 Naval Air Squadron
- 821X Flight
- 822 Naval Air Squadron
- 823 Naval Air Squadron
- 824 Naval Air Squadron
- 825 Naval Air Squadron
- 826 Naval Air Squadron
- 827 Naval Air Squadron
- 828 Naval Air Squadron
- 830 Naval Air Squadron
- 831 Naval Air Squadron
- 845 Naval Air Squadron
- 846 Naval Air Squadron
- 848 Naval Air Squadron
- 849A Flight
- 849B Flight
- 849C Flight
- 849D Flight
- 849E Flight
- 890 Naval Air Squadron
- 891 Naval Air Squadron
- 892 Naval Air Squadron
- 893 Naval Air Squadron
- 894 Naval Air Squadron
- 895 Naval Air Squadron
- 897 Naval Air Squadron
- 898 Naval Air Squadron
- 899 Naval Air Squadron
- 1702 Naval Air Squadron
- 1792 Naval Air Squadron
- 1830 Naval Air Squadron
- 1831 Naval Air Squadron
- 1832 Naval Air Squadron
- 1833 Naval Air Squadron
- 1840 Naval Air Squadron
- 1841 Naval Air Squadron
- 1842 Naval Air Squadron
- 1843 Naval Air Squadron
- 1844 Naval Air Squadron
- 1850 Naval Air Squadron
- 1851 Naval Air Squadron

== Units ==
- Air Headquarters Malta Communication Flight RAF formed here on 1 March 1944 from part of the ASR & Communication Flight RAF, moving to Luqa on 2 January 1946.
- Air Sea Rescue & Communication Flight RAF between 1 March and 25 August 1943, returning on 31 January 1944 and was renamed to the Malta Communications Flight on 1 March 1944.
- Communication Flight Malta RAF was formed here on 1 February 1943 and was disbanded into the ASR & Communication Flight RAF on 1 March 1943
- Hal Far Station Flight: DH.60M, Avro 504N, Tutor, Queen Bee & Swordfish
- Malta Fighter Flight between 19 and 29 April 1940 with the Sea Gladiator, reformed here on 2 May 1940 and was disbanded into 261 Squadron on 1 August 1940
- No. 418 Flight RAF disbanded here on 2 August 1940

== Closure ==
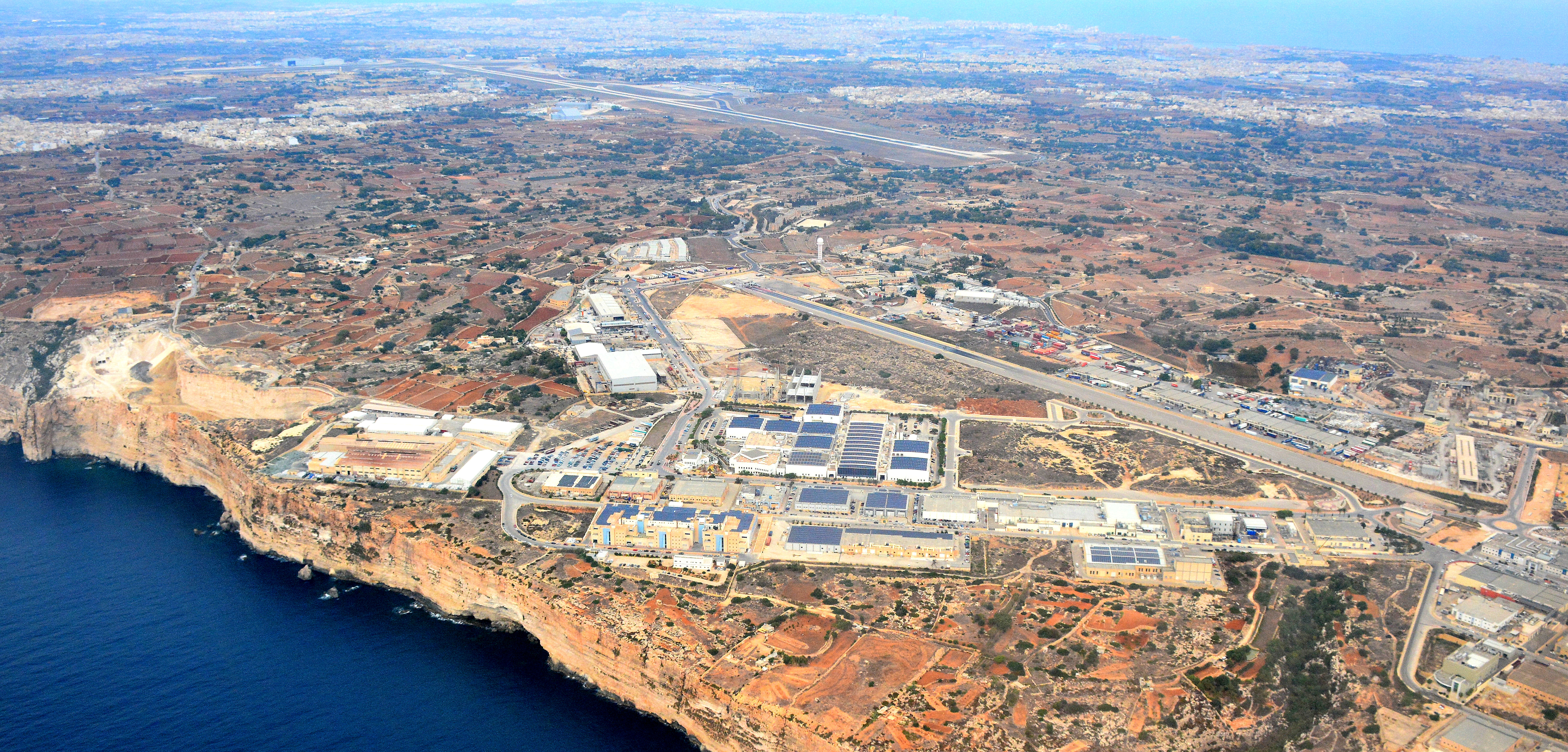
Aerial view of Hal Far, 2015, showing the dragstrip and business park. Visible beyond Hal Far is the much longer runway at Malta International Airport, formerly RAF Luqa

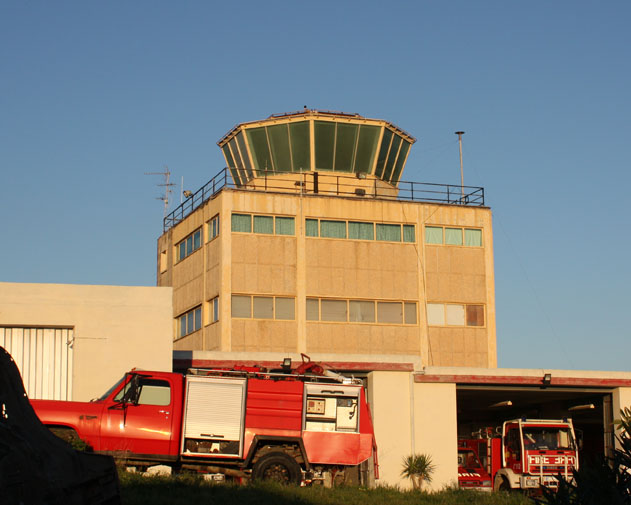
The old control tower of Hal Far

With the transfer of the airfield to the Maltese Government, who planned to convert Hal Far airfield into an industrial area, MIACO was asked to vacate its hangars and offices by September 1978. Both runways have been dug up and further development of the area reduced the airfield to a scar on the land. Runway 13/31 is currently being used by the Malta Drag Racing Association as a quarter mile dragstrip. Runway 9/27 is now a public road linking the various sections of the industrial area. Its scar can still be clearly seen on Google Maps when using the satellite image function. The control tower and the officer's quarters are still intact, together with a few Nissen huts. The kitchens and mess halls, the electricians and radio section cabin are still standing, but in a dilapidated state.

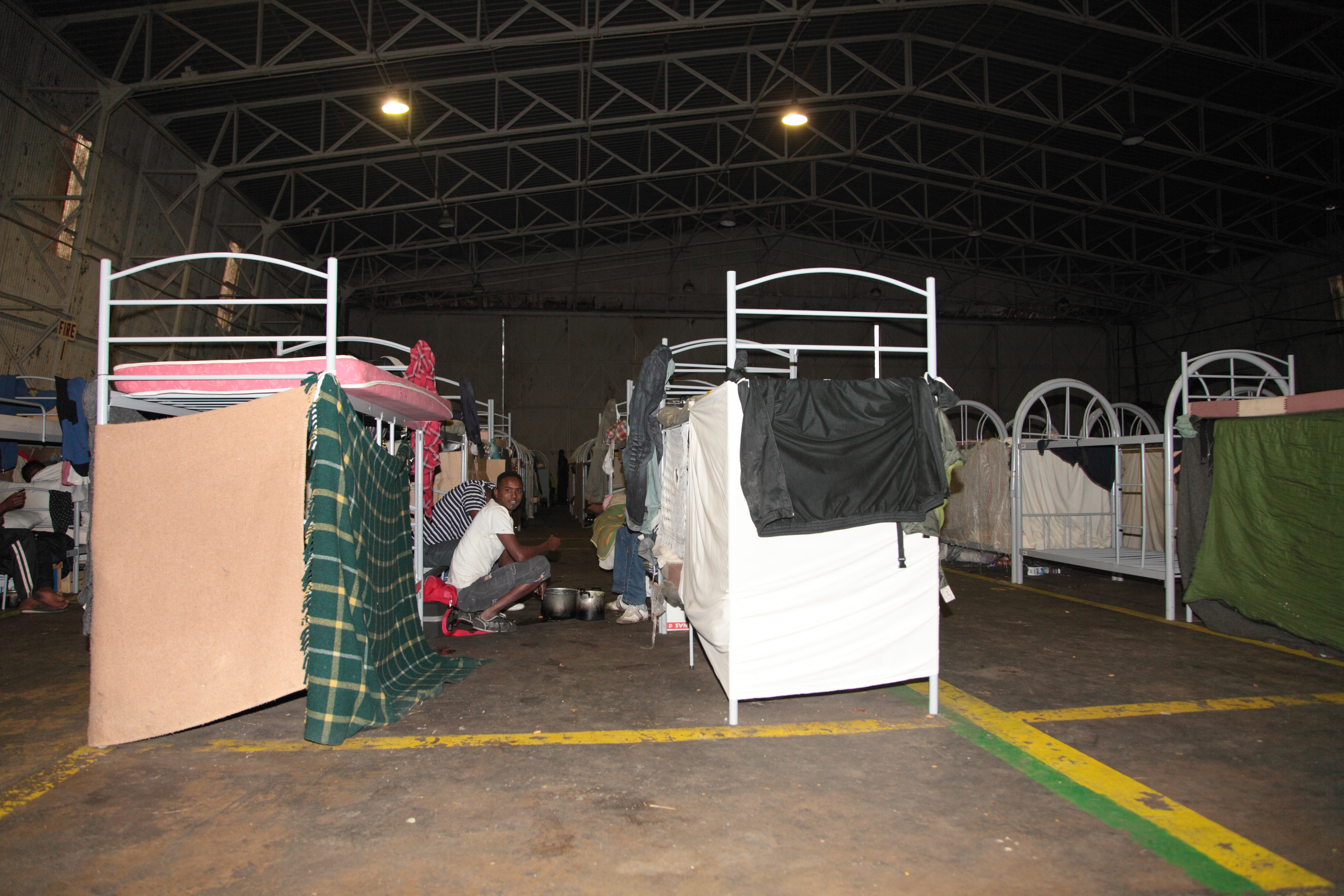
The hangar being used as a refugee camp.

Other parts of the airfield such as the hangar have been transformed into a refugee camp.

On 5 August 2010, the Employment & Training Corporation inaugurated an Underground Sick Bay which lies within the premises. This has been turned into a museum emphasising the period from 1923 to 1945. The website gives an insight of the Museum. A number of model aircraft 1/72 scale have been built by a number of enthusiasts which shows some of the aircraft that landed at Hal Far in this period.

== See also ==
- RAF Luqa
