= 728B Naval Air Squadron =

Inactive flying squadron of the Royal Navy's Fleet Air Arm

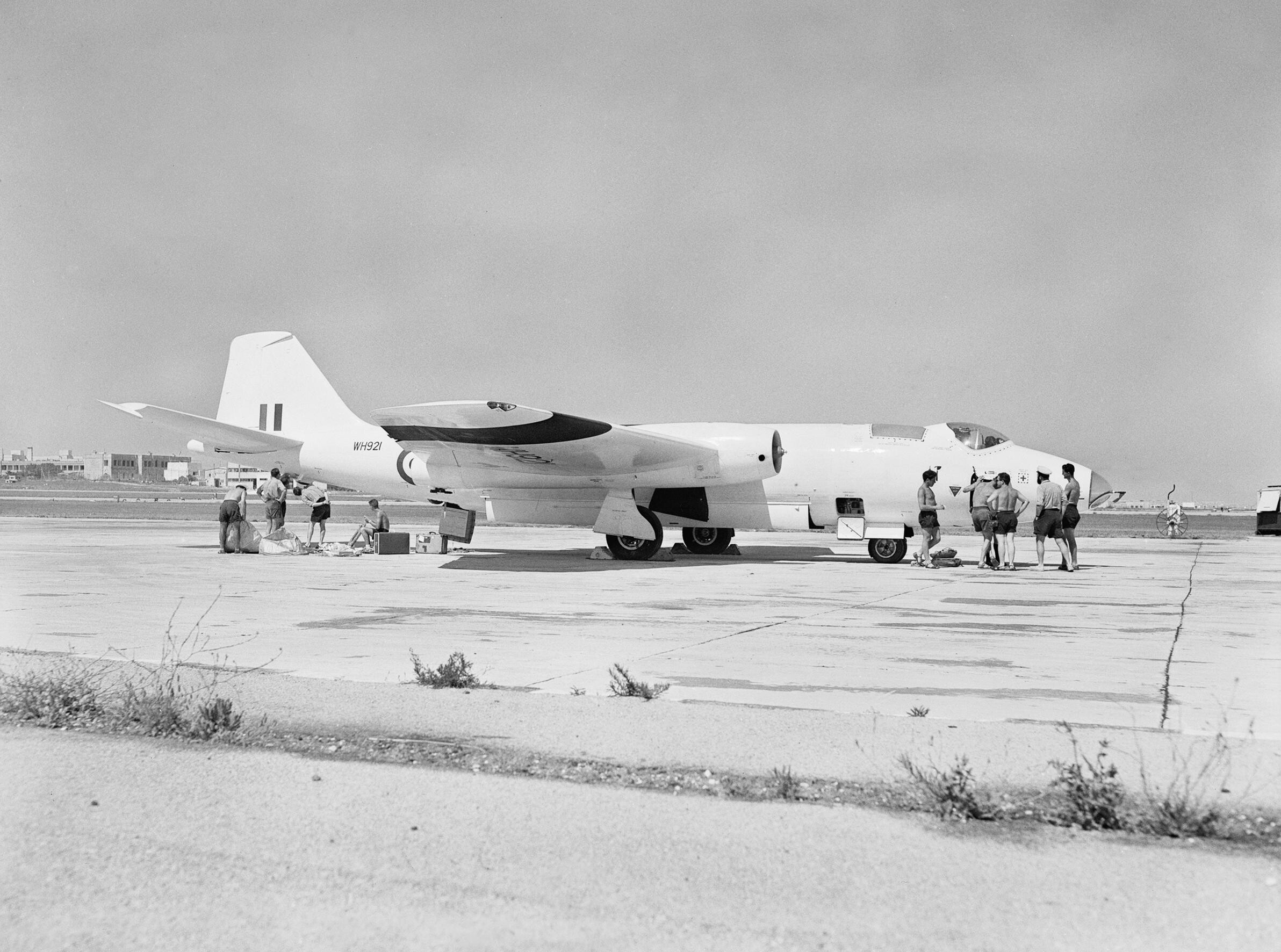
- English Electric Canberra U.14 Drone, 728B Squadron 'WH921'
- Active: 1945; 1958–1961
- Disbanded: 2 December 1961
- Country: United Kingdom
- Branch: Royal Navy
- Type: Fleet Air Arm Second Line Squadron
- Role: Fleet Requirements Unit; Pilotless Drone Target Unit
- Size: Squadron
- Part of: Fleet Air Arm
- Home station: See Naval air stations section for full list.
- Aircraft: See Aircraft operated section for full list.

Commanders
- Notable commanders: Lieutenant Commander J.G. Corbett, MBE, RN

Insignia
- Identification Markings: 590-599 (Firefly / Canberra); 655-659 (Meteor)

728B Naval Air Squadron (728B NAS), also called 728B Squadron, is an inactive Fleet Air Arm (FAA) naval air squadron of the United Kingdom’s Royal Navy (RN) which last disbanded in December 1961, having operated as a Pilotless Drone Target Unit

It first formed as a Fleet Requirements Unit at HMS Goldfinch, RNAS Takali in January 1945, with Miles Martinet and Supermarine Seafire aircraft, but disbanded in July. It later reformed in the United Kingdom in January 1958 at HMS Blackcap, RNAS Stretton, Cheshire and moved to Malta towards the end of February 1958, becoming operational at HMS Falcon, RNAS Hal Far in March 1958. It flew various fixed wing target drones, such as Fairey Firefly U.Mk 8 and U.Mk 9, Gloster Meteor U.15 and U.16 and English Electric Canberra D.14, in particular to support the Seaslug surface-to-air missile development program.

== History ==
=== Fleet Requirements Unit (1945) ===
728B Naval Air Squadron formed on 1 January 1945 at RNAS Takali (HMS Goldfinch), Malta, as a Fleet Requirements Unit. It was initially equipped with five Miles Martinet target tug aircraft and a number of Supermarine Seafire, a navalised version of the Supermarine Spitfire fighter aircraft. During May the numbers of both aircraft types were increased, however, in July, 728B Naval Air Squadron disbanded.

=== Pilotless Drone Target Unit (1958–1961) ===
728B Naval Air Squadron reformed on 13 January 1958 as a pilotless drone target unit at RNAS Stretton (HMS Blackcap), Cheshire, England. It was initially equipped with six Fairey Firefly U.Mk 9 target drone aircraft, these were converted Mk AS.4 and Mk AS.5 anti-submarine aircraft, which departed for Malta in February. Equipment and squadron personnel embarked in RFA Fort Duquesne and the squadron started at RNAS Hal Far (HMS Falcon), Malta, on 1 March.

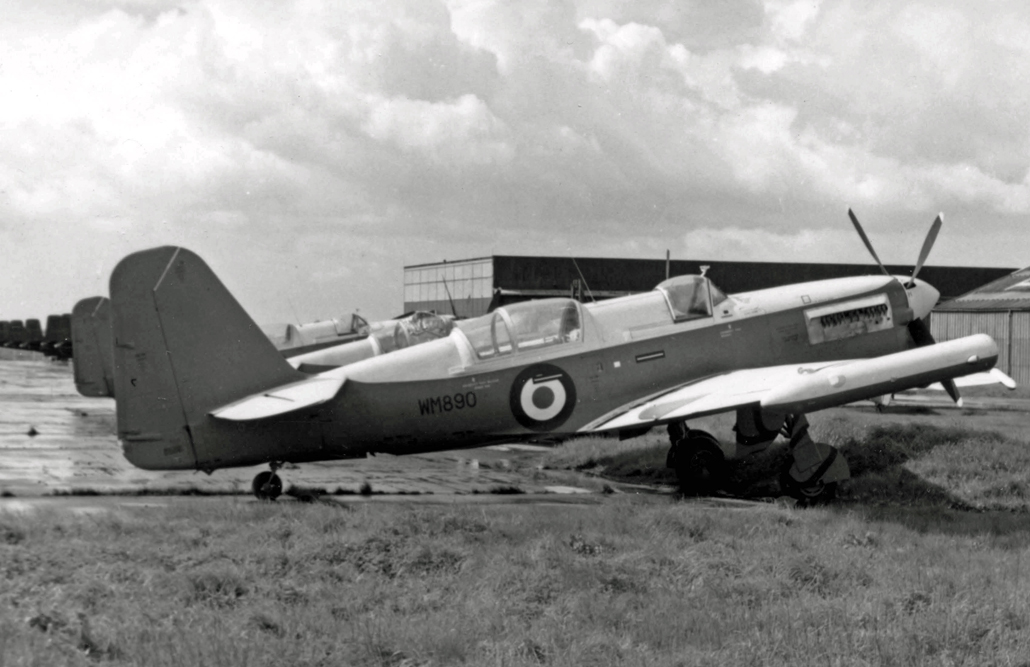
Fairey Firefly U.Mk 8

Constructed as Penlee Point, a Beachy Head-class repair ship, it was converted to a missile trials ship to support the Seaslug surface-to-air missile development program and was re-commissioned as HMS Girdle Ness. 728B Naval Air Squadrons role was to provide radio-controlled pilotless target aircraft for Seaslug missiles fired from the trials ship.

The ARSAERO CT 10, also known as the Arsenal/SFECMAS Ars 5501, a remote-controlled target drone, was also operated by the squadron and ships used this for anti-aircraft gun practice. Additional Fairey Firefly target drones were added in October 1958. Gloster Meteor U.15 were received in 1959, these were a target drone conversion of the F.4 jet fighter aircraft and these were followed by Gloster Meteor U.16, a converted F.8, in 1960. In May 1961 some English Electric Canberra U.14 arrived, these were remote-controlled target drones converted from the B.2 bomber and later designated D.14.

728B Naval Air Squadron disbanded at RNAS Hal Far (HMS Falcon) on 2 December 1961, having completed over two thousand hours test flying and flown over one hundred and fifty drone sorties across fifty-two different aircraft.

== Aircraft operated ==
The squadron has operated a number of different aircraft types, including:

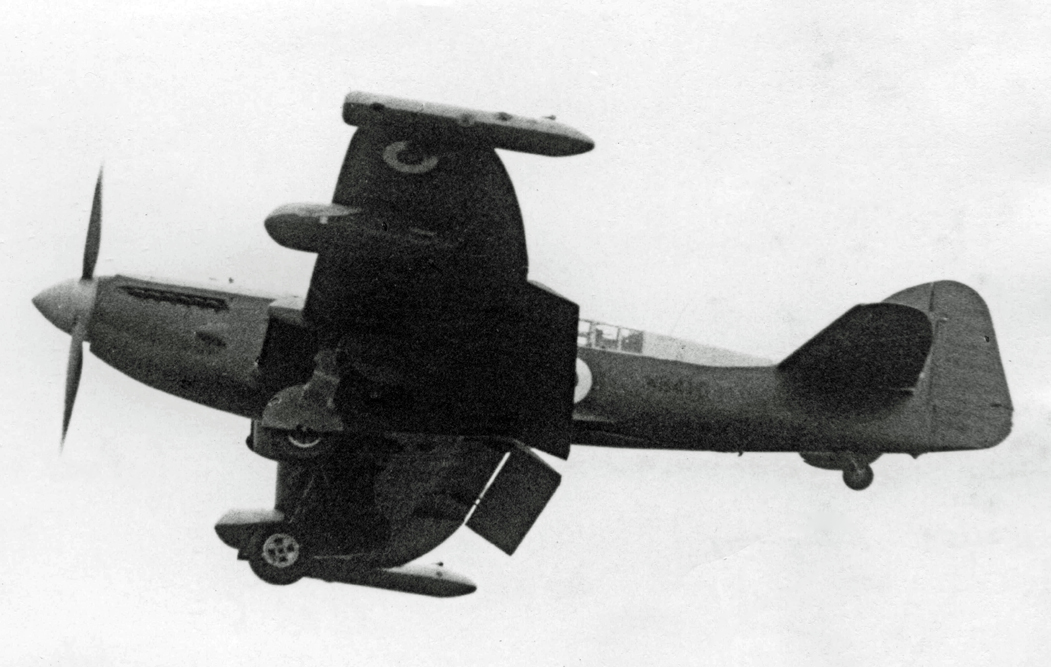
Fairey Firefly U.Mk 9

- Miles Martinet TT.Mk I target tug (January - July 1945)
- Supermarine Seafire F Mk III fighter aircraft (January - July 1945)
- Fairey Firefly U.Mk 9 target drone aircraft (March 1958 - November 1961)
- Gloster Meteor U.15 target drone aircraft (July 1959 - October 1961)
- Fairey Firefly U.Mk 8 target drone aircraft (October 1960)
- Gloster Meteor U.16 target drone aircraft (October 1960 - November 1961)
- English Electric Canberra D.14 remote-controlled target drone (May - December 1961)

== Naval air stations ==
728B Naval Air Squadron operated from a number of naval air stations of the Royal Navy, in England and overseas in Malta:

1945

- Royal Naval Air Station Takali (HMS Goldfinch), Malta, (January - July 1945)
- disbanded - (July 1945)

1958 - 1961

- Royal Naval Air Station Stretton (HMS Blackcap), Cheshire, (13 January - 17 February 1958)
- -transit- (17 February - 1 March 1958)
- Royal Naval Air Station Hal Far (HMS Falcon), Malta, (1 March 1958 - 2 December 1961)
- disbanded - (2 December 1961)

== Commanding officers ==
List of commanding officers of 728B Naval Air Squadron, with date of appointment:

1945

- Not known (January - July 1945)

1958-1961

- Lieutenant Commander J.G. Corbett, MBE, RN, from 13 January 1958
- disbanded - 2 December 1961
