= USS Gladiolus =

Minesweeper of the United States Navy

History

United States
- Ordered: as Sallie Bishop
- Acquired: 2 June 1864
- Commissioned: 15 June 1864
- Decommissioned: 30 August 1865
- Fate: Sold, 15 September 1865

General characteristics
- Displacement: 81 tons
- Length: 88 ft (27 m)
- Beam: 18 ft 6 in (5.64 m)
- Depth of hold: 7 ft 9 in (2.36 m)
- Propulsion: steam engine; screw-propelled
- Armament: two 12-pounder rifles; one 24-pounder howitzer

USS Gladiolus was a steamship acquired by the Union Navy during the American Civil War.

== Service history ==
Gladiolus was employed as a tugboat, a collier, a dispatch boat and a picket and patrol boat in support of the Union blockade of Southern waterways. Once Charleston, South Carolina, had been captured by Union forces, Gladiolus was employed as a minesweeper and as a salvage ship, clearing obstructions in the harbor. Gladiolus, formerly tug Sallie Bishop, was purchased at Philadelphia 2 June 1864 by Commodore C. K. Stribling. She commissioned 15 June 1864. Gladiolus departed Philadelphia 17 June 1864 to join Rear Admiral John A. Dahlgren's South Atlantic Blockading Squadron, and was assigned to Charleston station, arriving 25 June.

For the next six months she was actively engaged in towing and coaling ships of the squadron, and served as a night picket boat protecting the powerful ironclads from torpedo and boarding attack. During this period she was also assisted in the capture of several blockade runners. After the capture of Charleston in February 1865, Gladiolus worked in the harbor clearing obstructions and searching for torpedoes (mines). She subsequently served as a dispatch boat for the squadron between Florida ports and Port Royal, South Carolina, until she sailed for Washington, D.C. from Charleston 17 August 1865. She decommissioned at Washington Navy Yard 30 August 1865, and was sold 15 September to S. M. and J. M. Flanagan. Gladiolus returned to merchant service under the same name and was lost in 1887.
