= 848 Naval Air Squadron =

Inactive flying squadron of the Royal Navy's Fleet Air Arm

- Squadron badge
- Active: 1943-1945; 1952-1956; 1958-1963; 1964-1976; 1982; 1990-1991; 1995-2013; 2015-2016
- Disbanded: 2 June 2016
- Country: United Kingdom
- Branch: Royal Navy
- Type: Torpedo Bomber Reconnaissance squadron
- Role: Carrier-based: anti-submarine warfare (ASW); anti-surface warfare (ASuW); Tactical airlift; Maritime counter-terrorism; Sea King HC.4 aircrew and maintainer training
- Part of: Fleet Air Arm
- Mottos: Accipe Hoc (Latin for 'Take This')
- Aircraft: See Aircraft operated section for full list.
- Battle honours: Normandy 1944; Okinawa 1945; Japan 1945; Falkland Islands 1982; Kuwait 1991

Insignia
- Squadron Badge Description: Red, plate charged with a hawk [Accipiter Gentilis] volant proper releasing a torpedo also proper into water barry wavy blue and white (1945)
- Identification Markings: 4A+ (Avenger); 370-391 (Avenger June 1945); single letters (Whirlwind 1952-56); 351-355 (Whirlwind 1959-63); single letters (Wessex); VA+ (Wessex June 1971); WA+ (Wessex 1982); WA+ (Sea King December 1990); ZO-ZZ (Sea King February 1995); WA-WZ (Sea King January 1999); single letters (Sea King 2015)
- Fin Carrier/Shore Codes: X (Avenger March 1945); B (Whirlwind 1959-63); A:B (Wessex); A:B:VL (Wessex June 1971)

848 Naval Air Squadron (848 NAS), sometimes alluded to as 848 Squadron, was a Fleet Air Arm (FAA) naval air squadron of the United Kingdom’s Royal Navy (RN). It was most recently active with the Westland Sea King HC.4 / Westland Commando helicopter from May 2015 to June 2016 and was based at RNAS Yeovilton (HMS Heron) in Somerset.

It served during the latter years of the Second World War with Grumman Avenger and Fairey Swordfish. It flew variants of Westland Whirlwind helicopters during the fifties, supporting Royal Marines deployments overseas, transitioning to Westland Wessex and Westland Wasp helicopters during the sixties and seventies. It also briefly flew Westland Wessex during 1982, notably during the Falklands conflict. The squadron operated Westland Sea King during the nineties, initially during the Gulf War and later provided advanced flying training to pilots for the other squadrons in the Commando Helicopter Force until 2013.

== History ==
=== Second World War ===
848 Naval Air Squadron was established on 1 June 1943, at RNAS Quonset Point (HMS Saker II) in Rhode Island, which was a U.S. Naval Air Station that had been lent to the Admiralty since October 1942. Its function was to serve as a Torpedo, Bomber, and Reconnaissance Squadron. The squadron was equipped with twelve Grumman Avenger Mk I aircraft, an American carrier-based torpedo bomber.

The squadron relocated briefly to the RN Air Section at USNAS Brunswick, Maine, on 15 July 1943, another U.S. Naval Air Station loaned to the Admiralty, for a couple of weeks, before relocating again, next to the RN Air Section at USNAS Squantum, Quincy, Massachusetts, again on loan to the Admiralty, on 31 July 1943 to complete its work-up. It subsequently embarked on the Ruler-class escort carrier HMS Trumpeter on 1 September for the UK, disembarking on 30 October.

In April 1944, 848 squadron was assigned to 16 Group of RAF Coastal Command where it operated from RAF Manston in Kent and RAF Thorney Island in West Sussex. Leading up to D-Day, 848 would conduct anti-shipping operations. On D-Day itself, 848 squadron carried out anti-shipping and smoke laying operations.

848 would then be assigned to HMS Formidable in September 1944, though the squadron would have to wait in Dekheila for 3 months while the Formidable underwent repairs. Embarking on HMS Formidable in January 1945, 848 Squadron provided air support for the invasion of Okinawa (Operation Iceberg) and air strikes on Formosa. Later in July, 848 Squadron conducted strikes on Japan until the end of the war.

=== Whirlwind (1952-1963) ===
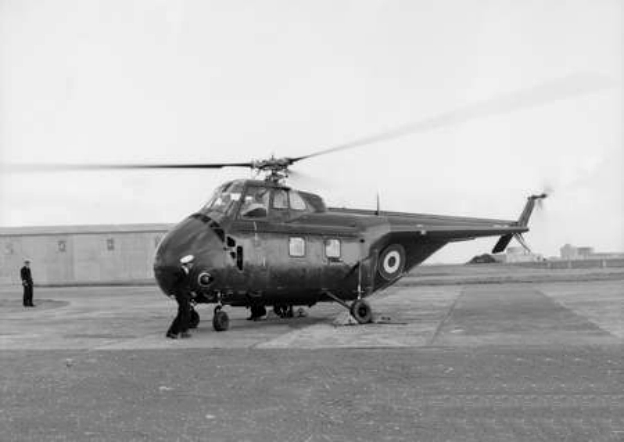
A Whirlwind HAR.21 of 848 Squadron in Malta.

The squadron reformed at RNAS Gosport (HMS Siskin), Hampshire, on 29 October 1952 with ten American-built Westland Whirlwind HAR.21s for work in Malaya. The Whirlwinds, constructed by the parent company in the United States and provided to Britain through the Mutual Defense Assistance Program (MDAP), were comparable to the HRS-2 variant of the United States Marines and were produced prior to the Whirlwinds manufactured by Westland. The ten HAR.21s were assigned serial numbers WV189 to 198.

In December, the squadron embarked in the ferry carrier HMS Perseus, disembarking at RNAS Sembawang (HMS Simbang), Singapore, in January 1953, where they came under the administrative jurisdiction of No. 303 Wing RAF. By early February, the squadron had achieved full operational status, conducting flights from an advanced base at RAF Kuala Lumpur, Malaya and significantly altering the tactical landscape on the ground, enabling the rapid transportation of troops to jungle locations within minutes, a journey that would have otherwise required hours on foot.

In recognition of their efforts throughout the year in supporting military operations against terrorist activities, they received the 1953 Boyd Trophy. In October 1954, five Whirlwind HAR.1 helicopters were incorporated for search and rescue missions, which were subsequently retired in June 1955. Operations persisted until 18 December 1956, at which point the squadron was disbanded at RNAS Sembawang.

On 14 October 1958, 848 Squadron was reformed at RNAS Hal Far (HMS Falcon), Malta, originating from 728C Squadron, the Amphibious Warfare Trials Unit. Armed with five Whirlwind HAS.22 helicopters, it became the inaugural Royal Marine Commando helicopter squadron, operating in Cyprus alongside 45 Commando, and was referred to as 45 Heliforce. Again, these helicopters wconstructed by Sikorsky Aircraft and the HAS.22 variant corresponded to the HO4S-3 of the United States Navy.

In October 1959, the squadron's helicopters were re-alocated to the Hal Far Station Flight and the squadron subsequently returned to the United Kingdom, reforming at RNAS Worthy Down (HMS Kestrel), Hampshire, in November with a fleet of sixteen Whirlwind HAS.7 helicopters, while retaining their Commando designation..

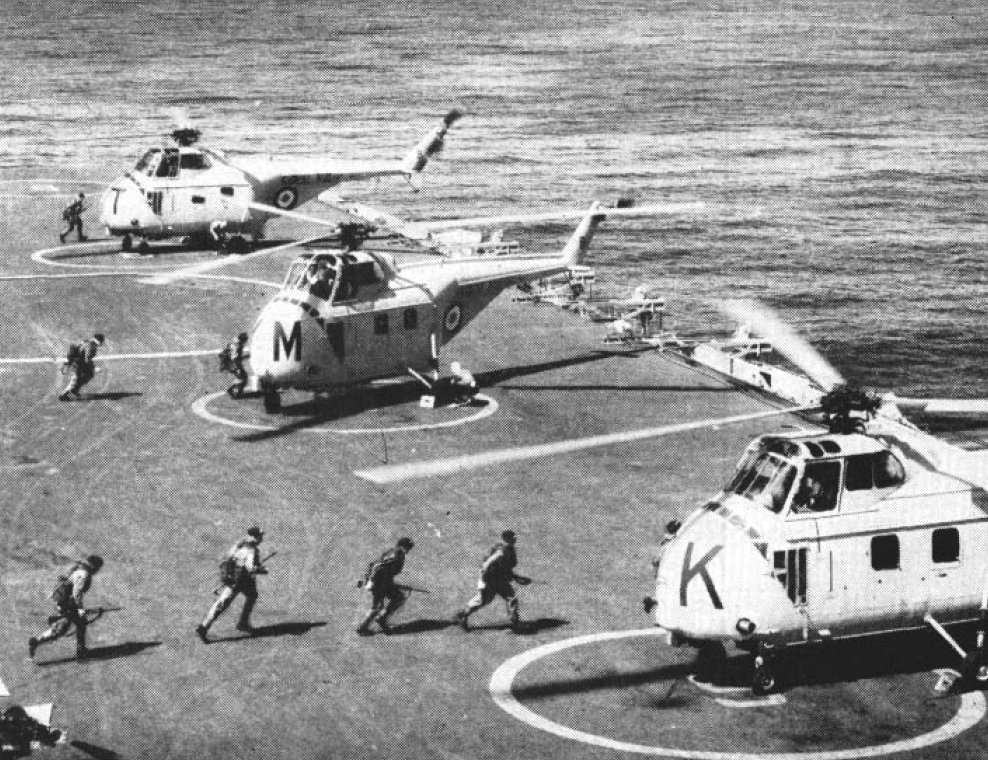
Westland Whirlwind of 848 Squadron aboard the commando carrier HMS Bulwark, c1961.

848 Squadron's twenty-six Whirlwind HAS.7 helicopters joined HMS Bulwark in early 1960 and deployed to the Far East for two and a half years - when the ship was in Singapore the squadron detached to the shore base HMS Simbang, which was also the HQ of the 3rd Commando Brigade & 42 Commando RM. In December 1962, 848 returned on HMS Bulwark to Plymouth The squadron disembarked to HMS Seahawk, at RNAS Culdrose, Cornwall, at the year's end. A portion of the squadron separated in May 1963 to establish 847 Squadron, and 848 Squadron was disbanded at RNAS Culdrose on 30 July 1963.

=== Wessex and Wasp (1964-1976) ===
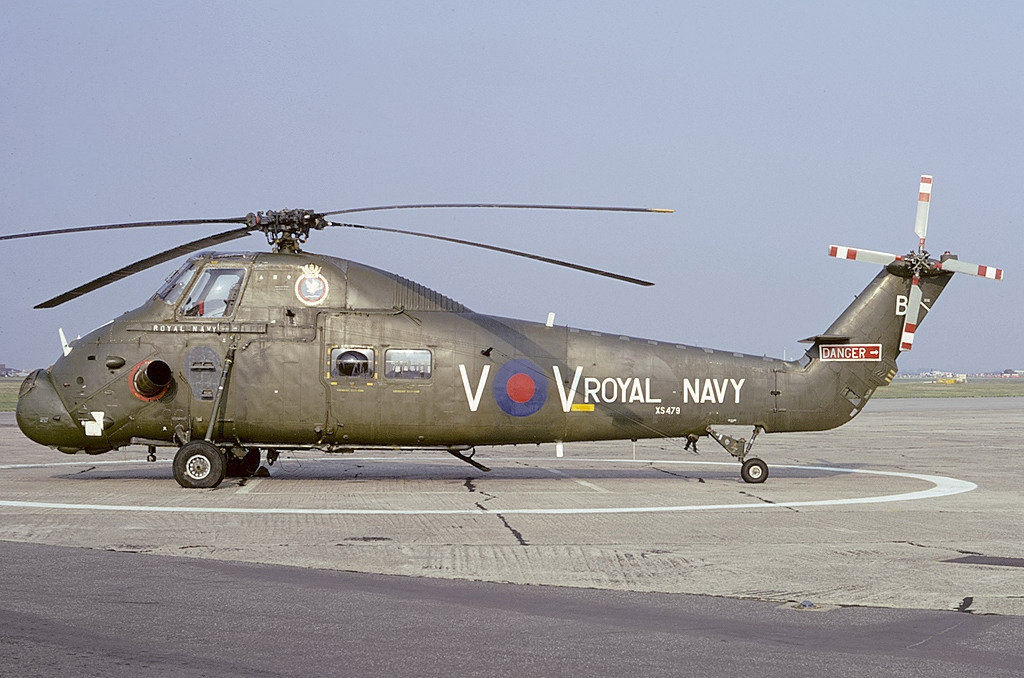
An 848 Squadron Westland Wessex with HMS Bulwark Fin Code at RAF Valley in 1975

848 was reformed at RNAS Culdrose on 7 May 1964, with a complement of eighteen Westland Wessex HU.5 helicopters. Additionally, from August 1967 until April 1973, these were supplemented by Westland Wasp HAS.1 helicopters.

The Wessex HU.5 was developed to fulfil the operational needs of the Royal Marine Commandos, providing a helicopter that could transport a dozen or more fully-armed combat troops into action from the deck of an aircraft carrier or commando carrier to launch an assault on an enemy beachhead. Additionally, the Wessex HU.5 was capable of engaging ground targets using wire-guided air-to-surface missiles or functioning as a 'gunship'.

Tasked as a Commando helicopter squadron its Wessex HU.5s spent a period in the Centaur-class light fleet carrier, converted to commando carrier HMS Albion in January 1965, then in March the ship sailed for Aden, where hot weather trials were carried out. After a visit to Mombasa, the ship then continued to Singapore, where 848 divided into a Headquarters Flight and four sub-Flights, operating as required from jungle bases. The detachments at Sibu and Nanga Gaat were relieved by No. 230 Squadron RAF's Whirlwinds in August 1965, but it was not until August 1966 that the complete squadron were embarked in HMS Albion for passage home.

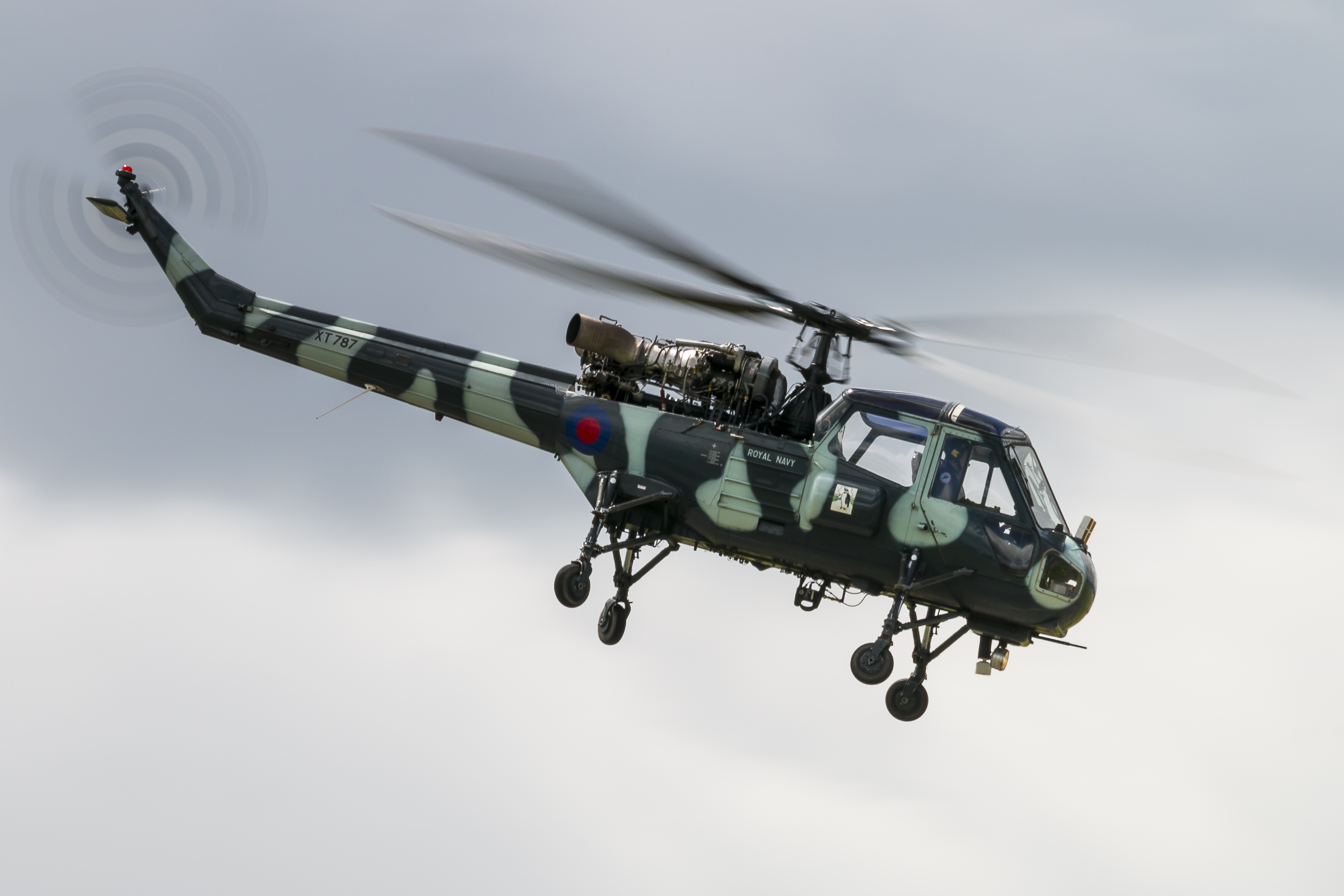
A Westland Wasp HAS.1, formerly of 848 Squadron

The Wasp HAS.1 was the inaugural helicopter of the Fleet Air Arm to conduct extensive operations from platforms situated on frigates and other smaller vessels. Wasps were capable of operating up to 10 nautical miles away from the parent ship, launching their torpedoes (or deploying depth charges during shallow water assaults) and maintaining patrol for approximately one hour.

In August 1967, a Westland Wasp was deployed for reconnaissance and liaison purposes. In March of the same year, the squadron participated in anti-pollution efforts following the grounding of the massive tanker SS Torrey Canyon off the Scilly Isles. The squadron spent time aboard HMS Albion before re-joining the ship in September to head back to Singapore. Additional periods were spent with HMS Albion for exercises and visits throughout the Far East and Australia, before the ship returned to the UK in June 1969. The squadron was reduced to ten aircraft, as eight were utilised to establish 847 Squadron at RNAS Sembawang in March.

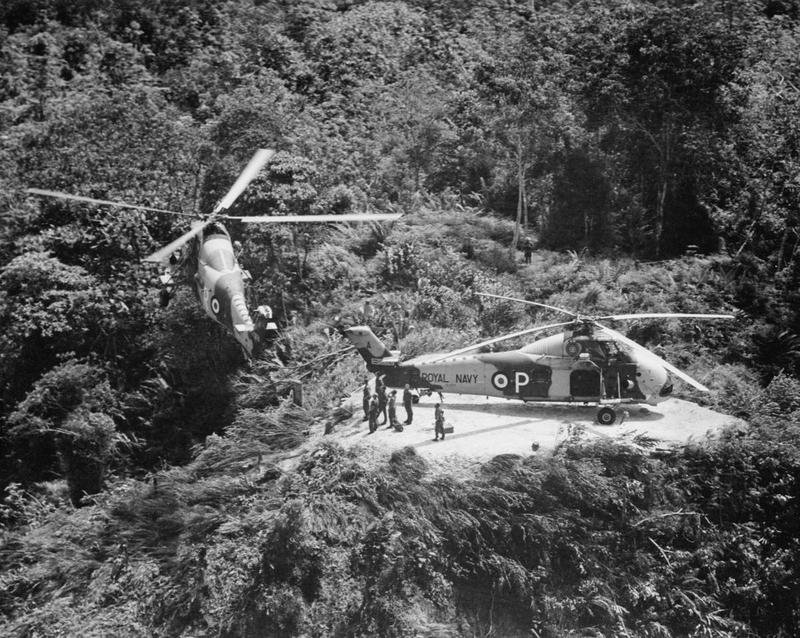
Westland Wessex of 848 Squadron drop a troop of Royal Marines to establish a landing zone in the Borneo jungle

In January 1970, 848 Squadron re-joined HMS Bulwark for another deployment to the Far East, ultimately returning to RNAS Culdrose in August. In March 1971, 848 Squadron was re-assigned to HMS Albion with twelve helicopters for an additional tour in the Far East, and upon arrival, the number of helicopters increased to twenty-two by acquiring the ten surplus aircraft from the disbanded 847 Squadron. Detached Flights operated from the Fearless-class amphibious warfare ship HMS Intrepid for certain periods before the entire squadron returned home at the conclusion of the year.

In April 1972, the squadron re-embarked for a period in the Mediterranean. Later that year, Flights were embarked on sister ship and lead ship HMS Fearless and HMS Intrepid, while the remaining two Flights joined HMS Bulwark. In January 1973, the entire squadron embarked on HMS Bulwark for a visit to the West Indies, returning in March and remaining attached to the ship until disembarking at RNAS Yeovilton for a duration of twelve months in March 1974. Subsequent periods were spent aboard HMS Bulwark with sixteen helicopters throughout 1975. In January 1976, a visit to the Caribbean was undertaken, and upon returning home, the squadron was disbanded at RNAS Yeovilton on 31 March.

==== Falklands War ====
On 17 April 1982, 848 Squadron was rapidly recommissioned at RNAS Yeovilton, drawing personnel from 707 and 772 Squadrons for deployment in the South Atlantic to take part in the sudden war to retake the Falkland Islands. The squadron was organised into four Flights, which were transported aboard SS Atlantic Conveyor, a container ship requisitioned by the Ministry of Defence through the STUFT (ship taken up from trade), the replenishment oilers RFA Olna and RFA Olwen, and the ammunition, explosives and stores supply ship RFA Regent. Tragically, 'D' Flight lost its aircraft when the SS Atlantic Conveyor was sunk on 25 May; the surviving members returned to the UK by air in early June. Meanwhile, 'A' and 'B' Flights made their way back to the UK on their respective ships in September. 'C' Flight returned by air from Port Stanley, Falkland Islands, in October, having left both of its helicopters with 845 Squadron. Ultimately, 848 Squadron was disbanded once more at RNAS Yeovilton on 30 November.

=== Sea King (1990-2016) ===
==== Gulf War ====
The squadron was reformed at RNAS Yeovilton on 16 November 1990, incorporating six Sea King HC.4 helicopters sourced from 845, 846, and 707 Squadrons, to serve in the Persian Gulf following the Iraqi invasion of Kuwait. The aircraft were deployed to the Gulf on the new SS Atlantic Conveyor, and after their operations in the desert, serve in Operations Desert Shield and Desert Storm, they returned home to disband at RNAS Yeovilton on 19 April 1991.

Designed as a troop transport and logistical support aircraft, the Sea King HC.4 conducted its inaugural flight at Yeovil in September 1979. It featured a fixed undercarriage, replacing the retractable variant (along with sponsons) found in other Sea King models. The Sea King H.C.4 was capable of transporting 27 fully equipped Royal Marine commandos or other personnel and was suitable for operations in both arctic and tropical environments.

==== MCT and training ====
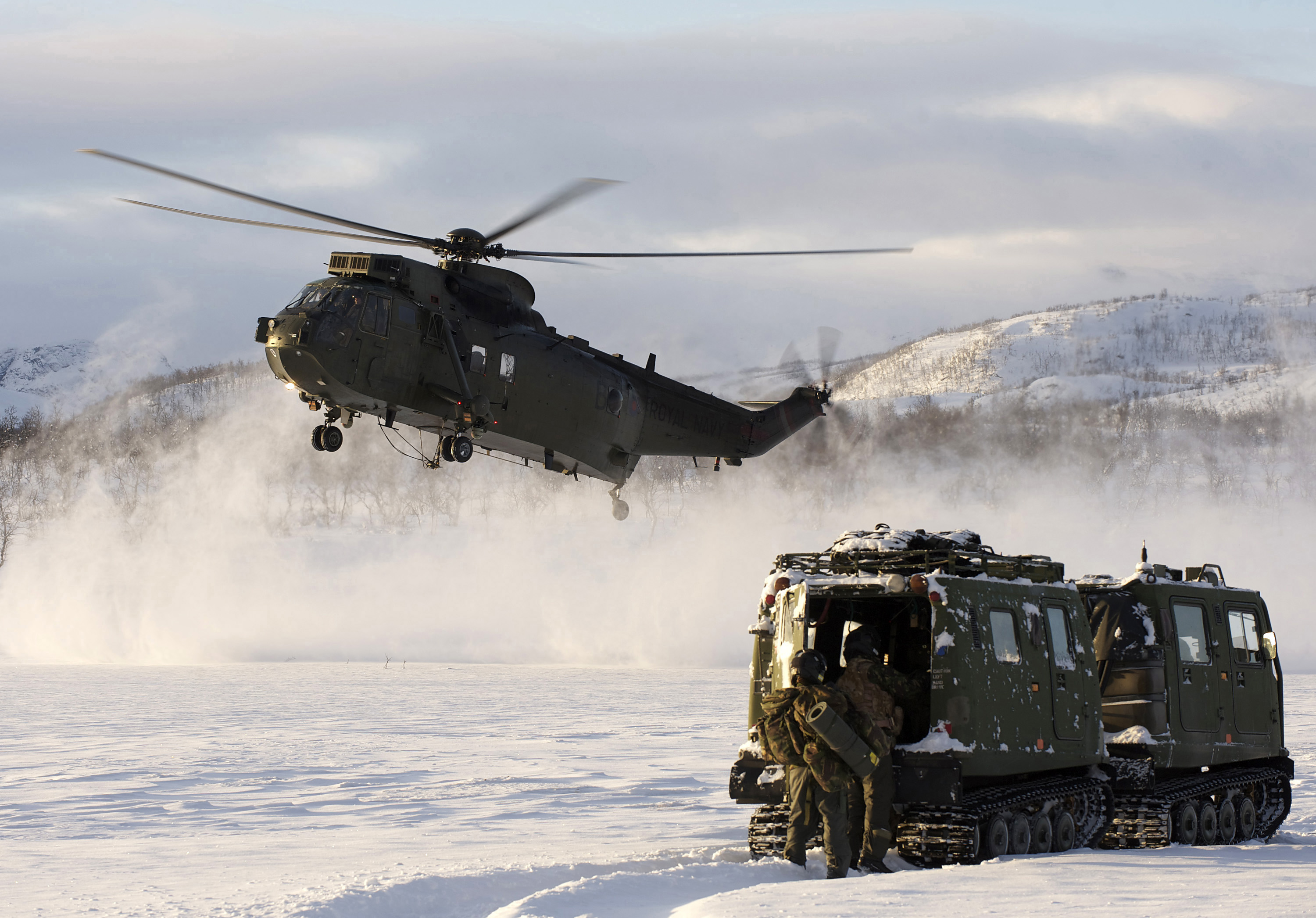
A Sea King HC4 used by 848 Squadron

Following the dissolution of 772 Squadron at RNAS Portland (HMS Osprey), Dorset, 707 Squadron assumed the Maritime Counter Terrorism (MCT) role and was re-designated as 848 Squadron in February 1995. Besides its MCT responsibilities, the primary function of the squadron was to provide training for Commando aircrew and maintainers of the Sea King HC.4, while also maintaining a wartime contingency role in support of Commando forces. 848 Squadron carried out three ab-initio training courses annually, along with various training detachments to address the diverse skills necessary for Commando aircrew; these detachments included mountain flying at continental bases and on HM Ships and RFAs for Deck Landing Training (DLT), as well as electronic warfare training at RAF Spadeadam, Cumbria and Dartmoor Ranges for the concluding military training exercise.

With a total of one hundred ratings and thirty officers, the Squadron was tasked with training up to sixty pilots and aircrew members each year. Utilising the Sea King HC.4, pilots engaged in Advanced Flying Training, which included emergency handling and instrument-only flying, prior to teaming up with the aircrewmen, who were Ratings sourced from the Royal Navy Royal Marines, to acquire skills for operating the aircraft in a tactical setting during operational flying training.

Additionally, the Squadron provided training for over one hundred and fifty helicopter maintainers each year before deploying them to the front lines. Both aircrew and maintainers underwent military and amphibious training, learning to operate effectively in the field and from the deck of a ship.

848 Naval Air Squadron disbanded in 2013.

==== Last Sea King Commando squadron ====
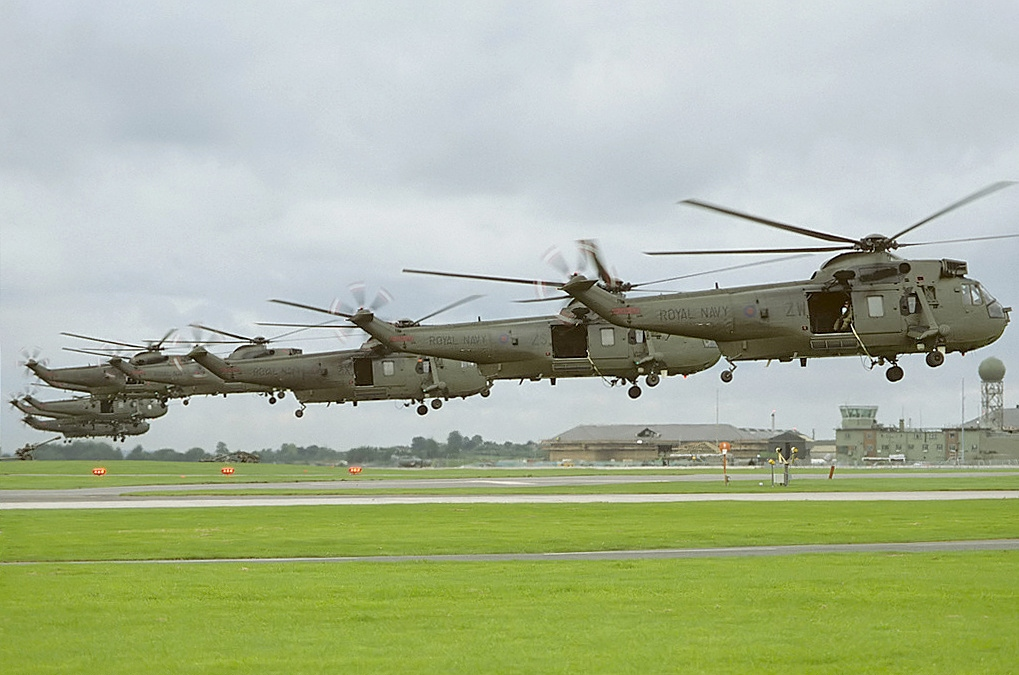
848 Squadron Sea Kings landing at RNAS Yeovilton

It reformed on 1 May 2015 as an operational Sea King HC.4 squadron; this was to allow 845 Squadron to convert to the AW-101 Merlin without a loss of operational capability.

This marked it as the final Commando Sea King squadron. Following training exercises both in the UK and internationally, only one of the remaining aircraft was retained and the helicopter, serial number ZA298, was subsequently donated to the Fleet Air Arm Museum. The last green 'Junglie' Sea Kings flew over RNAS Yeovilton on 24 March 2016 to salute the squadron decommissioning. The official disbandment of the squadron occurred in June 2016.

== Aircraft operated ==
The squadron operated a variety of different aircraft and versions:

- Grumman Avenger Mk.I torpedo and dive bomber (June 1943 - September 1945)
- Fairey Swordfish I torpedo bomber (August 1944)
- Grumman Avenger Mk.II torpedo and dive bomber (August - September 1945)
- Westland Whirlwind HAR.21 search and rescue helicopter (November 1952 - December 1956)
- Westland Whirlwind HAR.1 search and rescue helicopter (October 1954 - June 1955)
- Westland Whirlwind HAS.22 anti-submarine warfare helicopter (October 1958 - October 1959)
- Westland Whirlwind HAS.7 anti-submarine warfare helicopter (November 1959 - July 1963)
- Westland Wessex HU.5 troop transport helicopter (May 1964 - March 1976, April - November 1982)
- Westland Wasp HAS.1 anti-submarine warfare helicopter (August 1967 - April 1973)
- Westland Sea King HC.4 / Westland Commando commando assault and utility transport helicopter (November 1990 - April 1991, February 1995 - December 2013, May 2015 - March 2016)

== Battle honours ==
The following Battle Honours have been awarded to 848 Naval Air Squadron:

- Normandy 1944
- Okinawa 1945
- Japan 1945
- Falklands 1982
- Kuwait 1991

== Assignments ==
848 Naval Air Squadron was assigned as needed to form part of a number of larger units:

- 2nd Carrier Air Group (30 June - 31 October 1945)

== Commanding officers ==
List of commanding officers of 848 Naval Air Squadron:

1943 - 1945

- Lieutenant(A) R.G. Hunt, RN, from 1 June 1943 (Lieutenant Commander 10 September 1943)
- Lieutenant Commander A.P. Boddam-Whetham, RN from 9 May 1944
- Lieutenant Commander T.G.V. Percy, RN, from 21 August 1944
- Lieutenant Commander(A) A.W.R. Turney, RN, from 8 June 1945
- disbanded - 31 October 1945

1952 - 1956

- Lieutenant Commander S.H. Suthers, DSC, DFC, RN, from 29 October 1952
- Lieutenant Commander B. Paterson, MBE, RN, from 18 January 1954
- Lieutenant Commander M.W. Wotherspoon, RN, from 1 March 1955
- Lieutenant Commander D.T.J. Stanley, MBE, DFC, RN, from 8 July 1955
- disbanded - 18 December 1956

1958 - 1963

- Lieutenant Commander G.C.J. Knight, MBE, DFC, RN, from 14 October 1958
- Lieutenant Commander B.M. Tobey, RN, from 4 March 1959
- Lieutenant Commander T.J. Kinna, RN, from 15 November 1960
- Lieutenant Commander K. Mitchell, DFC, RN, from 20 January 1961
- Lieutenant Commander B.C. Sarginson, RN, from 19 February 1962
- Lieutenant Commander C.J. Isacke, RN, from 16 January 1963
- disbanded - 30 July 1963

1964 - 1976

- Lieutenant Commander C.J. Isacke, RN, from 7 May 1964
- Lieutenant Commander G.A. Andrews, RN, from 24 June 1964
- Lieutenant Commander P.J. Craig, RN, from 15 March 1966
- Lieutenant Commander P.J. Williams, RN, from 14 January 1967
- Captain M.J. Reece, RM, from 14 February 1969
- Lieutenant Commander B.B. Hartwell, RN, from 21 October 1970
- Lieutenant Commander R.E. Smith, MBE, RN, from 6 March 1972
- Lieutenant Commander B.G. Skinner, RN, from 11 April 1973
- Lieutenant Commander R.N. Woodard, RN, from 14 October 1974
- Lieutenant Commander J.J.D. Knapp, RN, 14 April 1975
- disbanded - 31 March 1976

1982

- Lieutenant Commander D.E.P. Baston, AFC, RN, from 19 April 1982
- disbanded - 30 November 1982

1990 - 1991

- Lieutenant Commander N.J. North, DSC, RN, from 16 November 1990
- disbanded - 19 April 1991

1995 - 2013

- Lieutenant Commander D.A. Lord, MBE, RN, from 9 February 1995
- Lieutenant Commander S.A. Daniels, RN, from 29 February 1996
- Lieutenant Commander M.D. Baines, RN, from 27 November 1998
- Lieutenant Commander P.K. Shawcross, RN, from 14 December 2000
- Lieutenant Commander M.V. Carretta, RN, from 22 August 2002
- Lieutenant Commander R.C. Fox, RN, from 7 January 2003
- Commander M.C. Walker, RN, from 27 July 2004
- Commander T.J. Tyack, RN, from 11 April 2007
- Commander M.G. Grindon, RN, from 3 April 2009
- Commander R.M.J. Sutton, MBE, RN, from 28 April 2011
- disbanded - 19 December 2013

2015 - 2016

- Commander G.I. Simmonite, DFC, RN, from 1 May 2015
- disbanded - 2 June 2016

Note: Abbreviation (A) signifies Air Branch of the RN or RNVR.

== Affiliations ==
The squadron had a number of affiliations:

- The Pirate Trust
- Downside School Combined Cadet Force (CCF)
- Birmingham University Royal Naval Unit (URNU)
- Crewkerne Branch of The Royal British Legion
