= Lyndonia (1920) =

Patrol vessel of the United States Navy

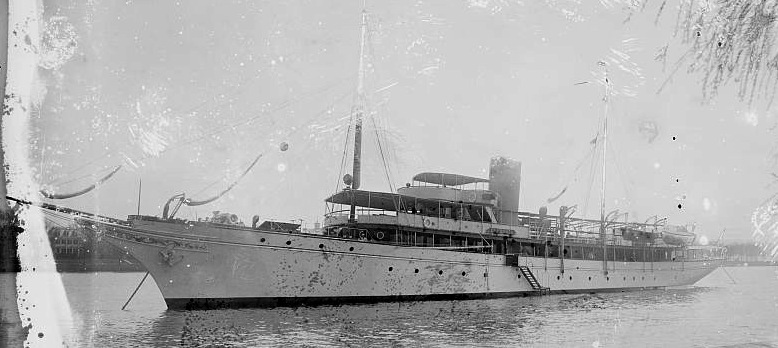
- Lyndonia (1920) photographed 27 March 1925 while owned by publisher Cyrus H.K. Curtis.

History
- Name: Lyndonia; Southern Seas (Pan American Airways); Southern Seas (US Army); USS Southern Seas (PY-32) (US Navy)
- Namesake: Curtis estate Lyndon, Wyncote, Pennsylvania
- Owner: Cyrus H.K. Curtis
- Builder: Consolidated Shipbuilding Company of Morris Heights, New York
- Launched: 1920
- Home port: Philadelphia, Pennsylvania (USCG #219815 registry)
- Fate: Sunk typhoon, Okinawa 9 October 1945
- Notes: Purchased Pan American Airways 1940, U.S. Army 30 December 1941, acquired by U.S.N. 23 December 1942

General characteristics
- Type: Yacht
- Tonnage: 812 gt
- Length: 70.104 m (230.00 ft) LOA
- Beam: 9.144 m (30.00 ft)
- Draught: 3.84 m (12.6 ft)
- Depth: 5.67 m (18.6 ft)
- Decks: 3
- Installed power: steam
- Propulsion: 4 boilers each with two oil burners & two triple expansion steam engines, replaced in 1925 with twin B&W 6 Cyl diesels
- Speed: 16 knots (30 km/h; 18 mph)
- Range: 6,000 at 12
- Crew: 39, 6 guest staterooms

Lyndonia, built 1920, was the second steam-yacht bearing the name (Note: The first, built 1907, became USS Lyndonia (SP-734).) and the third yacht built for publisher Cyrus H.K. Curtis of the Curtis Publishing Company by the then Consolidated Shipbuilding Company of Morris Heights, New York. The name is taken from the historic name of his estate, Lyndon, in Wyncote, Pennsylvania.

After Curtis' death in 1933, the yacht was purchased by Pan American Airways, converted to a floating hotel for use in the south Pacific and renamed Southern Seas in a shuttle service from Nouméa to Australia. At the outbreak of World War II, the vessel was taken over by the U.S. Army for use as a passenger and cargo ship until grounded on a New Caledonian reef. The ship was salvaged by the U.S. Navy, repaired in New Zealand, commissioned 23 December 1942 as USS Southern Seas and designated as a Patrol Yacht (PY-32).

== Yacht Lyndonia ==
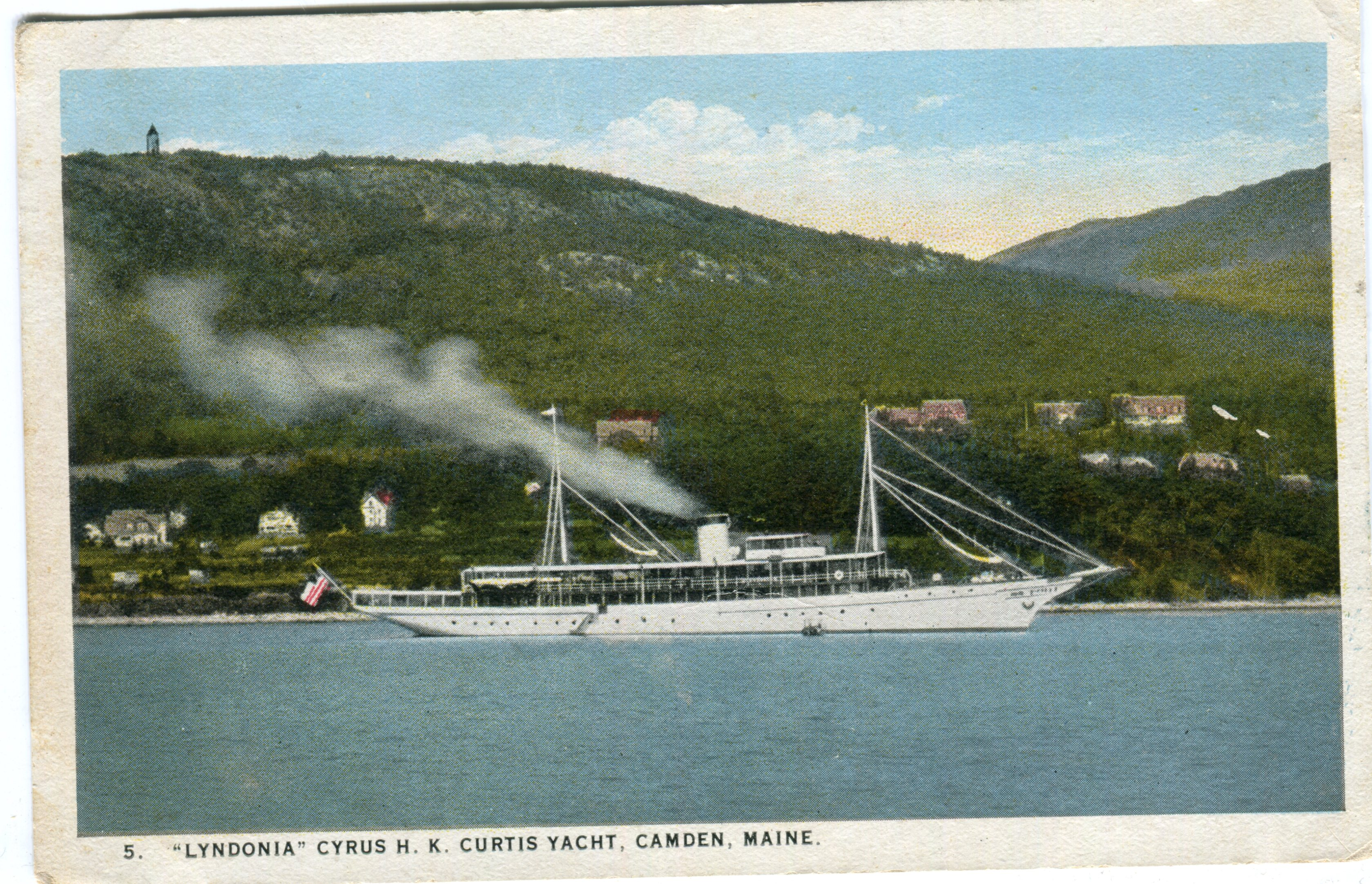
Postcard of the Lyndonia in Camden Maine

Lyndonia was named "Yacht of the Year" in the May 1920 issue of The Rudder and described as the largest and most completely fitted vessel of the kind since World War I had put a stop to such construction. She was launched 3 April 1920 with Curtis and a large party of friends as witnesses, including Curtis' captain, A. W. Rich. The ship was expected to be fitted out and ready for the season by 1 June.

The yacht had three decks with the Jacobean style dining saloon, the early Tudor style smoking room, and some accommodations on the main deck. Half of the lower deck was reserved for the owner and guest with six guest staterooms. The owner's apartments were created to resemble those found in a fine home ashore. The ship had a number of boats, the owner's 30-foot launch and a 24-foot crew's launch, two 22-foot lifeboats, and an 18-foot dinghy. She was powered by four Seabury boilers with two oil burners to each and two triple-expansion steam engines with cruising speed of about 16 knots and range of 3,000 miles at that speed or 6,000 at 12 knots. Electricity was furnished by a 15 kW and a 30 kW General Electric generating set. She was fully equipped for navigation and had a ship stabilizer as well as gyrocompass built by Sperry Gyroscope Company. In 1925, the steam plant was replaced with two diesel engines. The ship had a crew of 39, and Curtis spent considerable time and did much of his business aboard.

In a 1922 interview with New York Times reporter Rose C. Feld, Curtis stated "Yachting is not a hobby with me. It is a necessity. I spend half my time on this ship." He noted that most of his meetings with his staff or directors were held in the Lyndonia's dining room and that he stationed the ship to facilitate meetings. Comparing his use, and its position as his second home, he told the reporter "Most yacht owners show an annual run of three thousand miles. Ten thousand miles of cruising is no unusual figure for the Lyndonia. The yacht spent winter months in southern waters with many references to its Florida visits in social pages and returned to Camden for summer with her whistle on arrival signaling "summer" to some.

After Curtis' death on June 7, 1933, the ship was laid up much of the time until sold to Pan American Airways in 1940. Records related to the later sale of the vessel to the U.S. Army in 1940 mention "Corres. re: M. V. Southern Seas, including "A narrative relating to purchase and operation of the M.V. Southern Seas"; Bill of Sale from Mrs. Curtis (wife of owner of The Saturday Evening Post) to Pan American Airways, Inc."

== Southern Seas ==
=== Pan American Airways ===
Pan American Airways acquired the ship and made modifications for use as a "hotel" ship and surface link for its Clipper service based in Nouméa to Australia before it acquired landing rights in Australia. By September 1940 the ship was in Sydney for overhaul. The combination air-sea link between San Francisco and Sydney, made necessary by early British air lines' opposition to landing rights, was to be on a seven-day schedule with the ship's twenty luxurious staterooms providing the sea link for forty passengers at a cost of about £24 Australian.

The war in Europe was intruding with the German raider Orion having sunk ships and been active off New Caledonia in mid-August 1940 and even flying a reconnaissance aircraft over Nouméa that observed pro-de Gaulle and anti-Vichy crowds in public areas. Changed plans were indicated by early September with reports in connection with a report of high level visitors, including Cornelius Vanderbilt Whitney, chairman of Pan American's directors, arriving by Clipper in Auckland by way of Nouméa that the yacht was purchased as a "floating air base" and not as a surface connection to Australia. The tense political situation contributing to these decisions is noted in a report of Mr. Vanderbilt's description of Nouméa with crowds demonstrating in favor of General de Gaulle under the guns of a Vichy warship, the Dumont d'Urville. By mid September 1940 agreement had been reached on sharing routes, part of Pacific defense plans reached at a Wellington, New Zealand conference, resulted in plans for the ship's surface shuttle being replaced by its use as a floating transit hotel in Nouméa's harbor while the wartime political situation on the French island was resolved with the September 19 arrival of de Gaulle's representative Henri Sautot backed by HMAS Adelaide.

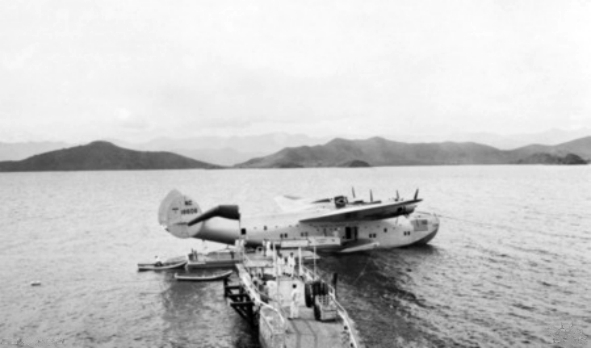
Pan American Clipper at Nouméa, 1941.

By May 1941, the ship was described, in contrast to a somewhat shabby but free Nouméa, as lying a half-mile out in the harbor, a "dazzling white motor yacht" the "embodiment of smartness and comfort" with American officers and drink stewards, Melanesian deck hands and Japanese waiters that make passengers feel like millionaires at least for a night.

The political situation's resolution in Nouméa resulted in the ship and routes being under Free vice Vichy French control of the Pan American air link until U.S. entry into the war.

=== U.S. Army ===
After 7 December 1941, Pan American abandoned its commercial facilities in the Pacific war zone and requested they be taken over by the U.S. military. Southern Seas, along with other company property, was taken over by the U.S. Army and the seaplane base was kept operational by two Army Engineers, Captain MacCasland and Lieutenant Sauer, after Pan American evacuated its employees shortly after 7 December. On 30 Dec. 1941 the M.V. Southern Seas was purchased from Pan American Airways Inc. by the U.S. Army District Engineer (Hawaii) for the sum of one dollar while settlement was reached on value of the ship. The ship had been recommended for use as a transport supporting U.S. Army construction of South Pacific air ferry route airfields by Leif J. Sverdrup with some work surveying islands for suitable field locations.

The Southern Seas was being used in February 1942 for accommodating airbase construction personnel in Nouméa harbor with a meeting aboard described by Captain Norman Miller in I Took The Sky Road between himself, a Lt. Colonel Rich and 'Jack' Sverdrup, in charge of constructing airfields on a number of the islands, during a stop in Nouméa harbor on the return flight of XPBS-1 from Java:

The luxury of the Southern Seas was a far cry from the cramped quarters of the old XPBS, and I remained aboard over night, reveling in comforts previously enjoyed by Pan Am's customers. But the yacht was of no further use to Pan Am. Their service to New Zealand had been discontinued. The yacht was to be turned over to Sverdrup to serve him as a floating office which could follow him around among the islands.

In the meeting, they decided Sverdrup would fly from Nouméa to Suva, Sverdrup's headquarters, with the former yacht following.

On 22 July 1942, in Taruia Pass while en route to Penrhyn Island on an island charting assignment, the ship struck an uncharted reef and her engine rooms were flooded.

=== U.S. Navy ===
After the collision, the United States Navy salvaged Southern Seas and towed her from New Caledonia to New Zealand, where she was docked while the holes in the hull were patched and repairs were made on the main engines. The homeport and navy yard of the Southern Seas was Pearl Harbor, but she had never been there due to her extended operations in the forward areas. When the ship was first commissioned, Commander South Pacific Fleet, who at that time was Admiral Halsey, considered the possibility of using her as his flagship; however, he decided against it, and from that time on Southern Seas was used as a barracks ship for transient officers and enlisted men.

On 12 January 1943, Southern Seas got underway from Auckland, New Zealand, for Nouméa, New Caledonia. The ship remained there until June 1943, when she left for Tarawa, Gilbert Island by the way of Funafuti, Ellice Islands. At Tarawa, she again served as a barracks ship and was attached to Commander Aircraft Pacific Fleet at this time.

In February 1944, the Southern Seas departed for Kwajalein Island by the way of Makin, where she again assumed the duties of a barracks ship.

On 25 June 1944, Southern Seas departed from Kwajalein en route to Eniwetok, Marshall Islands in company with SS Pacific Sun and USS YMS-388, where she arrived on 27 June 1944. On 8 August 1944, Southern Seas was ordered to Saipan, Marianas Islands, where she again served as a barracks ship in the forward area. The ship remained at Saipan until 1 January 1945, when she departed for Guam, Marianas Islands. At Guam, the ship was attached to Commander Submarines Pacific Fleet and was moored alongside USS Holland (AS-3).

The ship was used as a quarters ship in Auckland, New Zealand, New Caledonia, Nouméa, Gilbert Islands, Marshall Islands and the Marianas where she was located at Guam at the end of the war. During the time that Southern Seas served as barracks ship, accommodating officials of the United States Government and newspaper correspondents, she compiled an impressive guest list including two vice admirals, thirty rear admirals, fifty-three captains, one lieutenant general, four major generals, six brigadier generals, forty-five newspaper correspondents, the Honorable Mr. Nash, New Zealand Minister to the United States, and Mr. Warren Atherton, National Commander of the American Legion.

On 7 September 1945, Southern Seas was ordered to Okinawa to work directly under Rear Admiral J. D. Price, U3 Navy, who was Commander Naval Operating Base, Okinawa. The ship arrived in Okinawa with the 15 September typhoon. During typhoon "Louise" of 9 October 1945, in which 12 ships were sunk, 222 grounded, and 32 damaged beyond crew's capability to repair, Southern Seas suffered collisions with five other vessels before sinking with the loss of 13 crew.

In naval service, the specifications of the ship are given as 230 ft (70.1 m) long overall and 200 ft (61.0 m) between perpendiculars, with a beam of 30 ft 3 in (9.2 m) and a draft of 15 ft (4.6 m). The ship had a full load displacement of 1,116 long tons (1,134 t) and a Gross register tonnage of 819. She was powered by two diesel engines, giving a speed of 11 kn (13 mph; 20 km/h). Southern Seas had a crew of 47.

== See also ==
Pacific Clipper for a significant event related to Pan American assets, Nouméa, and the outbreak of war in the Pacific.
