= USS Lyndonia (SP-734) =

Patrol vessel of the United States Navy

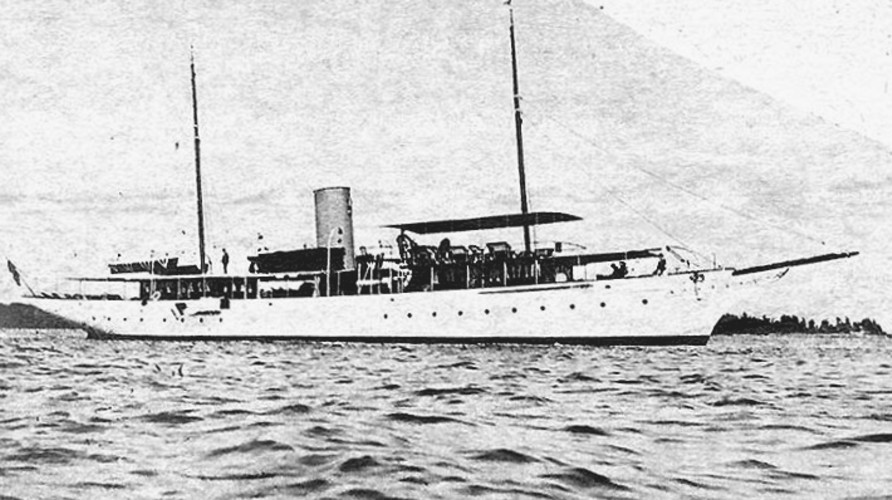
- Lyndonia (American Steam Yacht, 1907) photographed prior to her World War I era Naval service.

History

United States
- Name: USS Lyndonia
- Namesake: Renamed Vega, a star of the first magnitude in constellation Lyra used frequently by navigators.
- Builder: Gas Engine and Power Company and Charles L. Seabury Company.
- Laid down: Date unknown
- Completed: 1905
- Acquired: By the US Navy 5 September 1917
- Commissioned: 4 December 1917 as USS Lyndonia (SP 734) at Philadelphia, Pennsylvania
- Decommissioned: 13 September 1919 at Philadelphia
- Renamed: USS Vega (SP 734) on 20 February 1918, probably to avoid confusion with USS Lydonia (SP-700)
- Stricken: Circa 1921
- Home port: Norfolk, Virginia; Cape May, New Jersey; Annapolis, Maryland; Pensacola, Florida
- Fate: Sold 20 December 1921; ultimate fate unknown

General characteristics
- Type: Yacht
- Tonnage: 276 gross ton
- Length: 175 ft (53 m)
- Beam: 20 ft 4 in (6.20 m)
- Draft: 7 ft 9 in (2.36 m)
- Propulsion: Steam engine
- Speed: 15 knots
- Complement: 69
- Armament: One 3-inch gun; One 6-pounder rifle; Two machine guns
- Armor: Steel-hulled

USS Lyndonia (SP-734), later known as USS Vega (SP-734) was a yacht acquired by the U.S. Navy during World War I. She was assigned as an armed patrol craft, but, at times, performed other duties along the U.S. East Coast, such as dispatch boat and training ship for the U.S. Naval Academy. Post-war, she was disposed of through sale to the public.

== Constructed in New York ==
Lyndonia—a steel-hulled, steam yacht designed by Charles L. Seabury and built in 1907 at Morris Heights, New York, by the Gas Engine and Power Co. and the Charles Seabury Co.—was acquired by the Navy from the noted Philadelphia, Pennsylvania, publisher Cyrus H. K. Curtis on 5 September 1917. Designated SP-734 and converted for Navy use at the Philadelphia Navy Yard, the former yacht was placed in commission on 4 December 1917.

== World War I service ==
=== Start-up problems ===
Lyndonia departed Philadelphia on 22 December bound for Bermuda in company with Venetia (SP-431) and tugs Gypsum Queen (SP-430) and Montauk (SP-1213). At 1020 the following day, Lyndonia blew two tubes in her forward boiler; at 1800, all tubes in the after boiler blew as well. As the ship slowly lost steam, she signaled Venetia of her plight. Accordingly, at 1820, Montauk passed a hawser to Lyndonia and took her in tow. On Christmas Day, while en route to the Virginia Capes, the remaining boiler tubes blew, leaving the ship without any steam whatever.

As if losing steam were not enough, 10 minutes later, the hawser parted, leaving Lyndonia adrift for nearly 20 minutes before she was again taken in tow. Subsequently, Joseph F. Bellows (SP-323) pulled Lyndonia to the Norfolk Navy Yard where the yacht then underwent repairs in drydock.

=== Ice blocks passage ===
Lyndonia got underway on 4 February for New London, Connecticut, and arrived off the Delaware Capes the following day, only to encounter heavy ice floes which blocked further passage. She accordingly returned to Norfolk, Virginia, and remained there into the spring, serving as dispatch and mail boat in the Chesapeake Bay. During this tour of duty, on 20 February, the ship was renamed Vega.

On 22 April, Vega sailed for Philadelphia. Arriving there the following day, she was attached to the 4th Naval District and based at Cold Spring Inlet, near Cape May, New Jersey, for patrols off the New Jersey coast.

=== Friendly fire on a neutral ship ===
On 25 June, Vega sighted a ship resembling a surfaced submarine at long range. Going to general quarters, Vega altered course to close the unidentified craft and flashed recognition signals and challenges in Morse code. The ship would not respond, however, and Vega opened fire with her 6-pounder forward—firing six quick shots before the target hove to. Upon closer investigation, the unidentified ship turned out to be SS Skandeborg, a Danish merchantman bound from Cuba to New York City with a general cargo—mostly sugar. No member of the Danish vessel's crew knew Morse code—hence her seeming reluctance to reply to Vega's challenges!

The warship continued her operations out of Cold Spring Inlet into the fall of 1918. During this period, she also undertook local escort duties.

=== Assigned as training ship ===
On 28 October, following repairs at the New York Navy Yard, Vega sailed south to Annapolis, Maryland, where she arrived three days later to commence duties as a training ship for midshipmen at the U.S. Naval Academy. She remained in the Annapolis vicinity from 1 November to 4 December before she got underway for Pensacola, Florida, on 5 December.

Reaching Pensacola three days before Christmas, 1918, Vega conducted local operations out of Pensacola until 22 March 1919, when she got underway for Philadelphia.

== Post-war disposition ==
The yacht remained at the Philadelphia Navy Yard through the spring and summer months, and was decommissioned on Friday, 13 September 1919. She was subsequently sold to Charles H. Crocker, of San Francisco, California, on 20 December 1921. Meanwhile, in 1920, Curtis had a new ship built named Lyndonia after his home estate with that ship, one of the great yachts of its era, also seeing Army and Navy service in World War II.
