= HMS Surprise (K346) =

1946 Bay-class anti-aircraft frigate of the Royal Navy

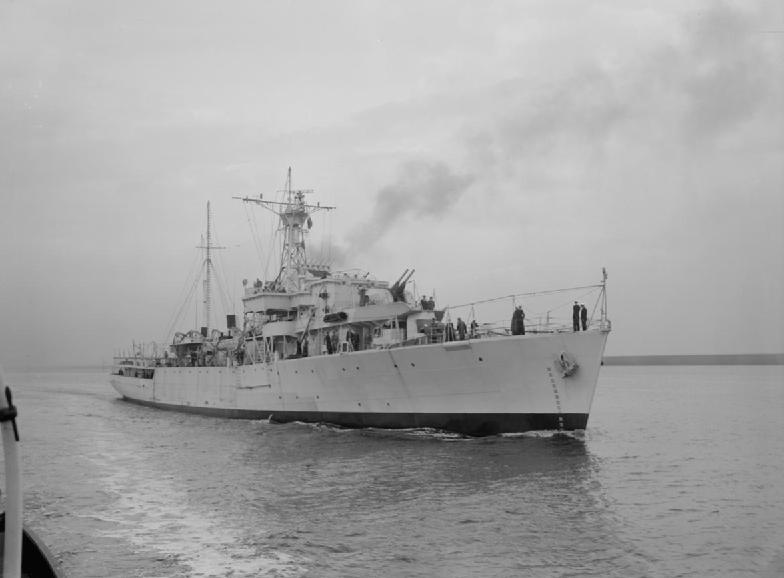
- Surprise in October 1946

History

United Kingdom
- Name: HMS Surprise
- Ordered: 25 January 1943
- Builder: Smiths Dock Company, South Bank, Middlesbrough
- Laid down: 21 April 1944
- Launched: 14 March 1945
- Completed: 7 September 1946
- Commissioned: 9 September 1946
- Decommissioned: January 1965
- Identification: Pennant number K346
- Motto: Sola Nobilitas Virtus; ("Virtue is the only nobility")
- Fate: Sold for scrapping, 1965
- Badge: On a field white, an ancient galley, black

General characteristics
- Class & type: Bay-class frigate
- Displacement: 1,600 long tons (1,626 t) standard; 2,530 long tons (2,571 t) full
- Length: 286 ft (87 m) p/p; 307 ft 3 in (93.65 m) o/a
- Beam: 38 ft 6 in (11.73 m)
- Draught: 12 ft 9 in (3.89 m)
- Propulsion: 2 × Admiralty 3-drum boilers, 2 shafts, 4-cylinder vertical triple expansion reciprocating engines, 5,500 ihp (4,100 kW)
- Speed: 19.5 knots (36.1 km/h; 22.4 mph)
- Range: 724 tons oil fuel, 9,500 nmi (17,600 km) at 12 knots (22 km/h)
- Complement: 160
- Armament: 2 × QF 4-inch (102 mm) Mark XVI guns on twin mounting HA/LA Mk.XIX; 4 × 20 mm Oerlikon A/A on 2 twin mounts Mk.V; 1 × Hedgehog 24 barrel anti-submarine mortar; 2 rails and 4 throwers for 50 depth charges

HMS Surprise was a Bay-class anti-aircraft frigate of the British Royal Navy. In commission from 1946 to 1965, she served in the Mediterranean Fleet as a Despatch Vessel for the Commander-in-Chief. Although principally employed for the use as a yacht by the CinC, Surprise was also deployed in its operational role as an anti-aircraft frigate and was allocated to the Haifa Patrol for a brief period in 1948. The archaic term "Despatch Vessel" was replaced by "Flag Frigate" in 1961.

== Construction ==
The ship was originally ordered from the Smiths Dock Company of South Bank, Middlesbrough on 25 January 1943 as the Loch-class frigate Loch Carron. However the contract was changed in 1944, and the ship was laid down as Admiralty Job No J4788 on 21 April 1944 to a revised design as a Bay-class anti-aircraft frigate. She was launched on 14 March 1945 as Gerrans Bay, but after the end of the war the plans were changed again and the ship was converted to a Despatch Vessel for use by the Commander-in-Chief, Mediterranean Fleet. The aft twin 4 in (100 mm) gun mounting was removed and replaced by offices and accommodation for the CinC and his staff. The ship was completed on 7 September 1946 and renamed Surprise with the pennant number K346.

== Service history ==
After sea trials Surprise was commissioned in September 1946, and sailed to Valletta, Malta, where she remained with the ships of the Mediterranean Fleet for exercises and visits throughout the Mediterranean Sea and the Red Sea, with periodic refits at HM Dockyard, Valletta.

In November 1952 Surprise returned to Portsmouth. As the Royal Yacht Britannia was still under construction Surprise was selected for conversion for use by Queen Elizabeth II in the Coronation Review. The forward twin 4 inch mounting was replaced by a special viewing platform. The work was completed in March 1953, and after trials in the English Channel, the ship was deployed at Portsmouth. She then sailed to the Solent and took part in the Fleet Review by Queen Elizabeth II on 15 June 1953. All members of ship's company were subsequently awarded Coronation Medal. The Royal Crest fitted in front of the bridge was retained as a permanent feature to commemorate her service. Surprise returned to Malta in July to resume her previous duties.

In 1961 a decision was made to retain the ship in service as the Flag Frigate as long as possible without a major refit, and the complement was reduced to 80.

In late 1964 Surprise returned to the UK, arriving at Portsmouth on 12 December. In January 1965 she was decommissioned and placed on the Disposal List. She was sold to BISCO on 29 June 1965.

== Publications ==
- Colledge, J. J.; Warlow, Ben (2006) [1969]. Ships of the Royal Navy: The Complete Record of All Fighting Ships of the Royal Navy from the 15th Century to the Present (3rd Rev ed.). London: Chatham Publishing. ISBN 978-1-86176-281-8. OCLC 67375475.
