= Dispatch boat =

Boats tasked to carry military dispatches

Dispatch boats were small boats, and sometimes large ships, tasked to carry military dispatches from ship to ship or from ship to shore or, in some cases from shore to shore. Dispatch boats were employed when other means of transmitting a message was not possible or safe or as quick.

Dispatch boats, which performed their dispatch-carrying duties only on a temporary basis, should not be confused with packet ships—sometimes called packet boats or paquetbots—which were cargo ships which also routinely carried the mail from port to port.

Generally, dispatch boats served the military, and paquetbots served commerce.

== Use of term by the U.S. Navy ==
Dispatch boat was a term used by the United States Navy in its journal accounts to describe boats which carried messages, or mail—otherwise termed dispatches—between high-ranking military officials aboard other ships or to land-based destinations.

== Dispatch boats during the American Revolution ==
In 1776 the Continental Navy ship Lynch was assigned dispatch boat duty and, after delivering her secret dispatches in France, set sail for the United States with French secret dispatches, only to be captured, but not before destroying the French dispatches.

== Dispatch boat race during the historic Battle of Trafalgar ==
Once the Battle of Trafalgar had been decided in favor of the British in October 1805, the honor of delivering the news of the victory as well as the loss of Admiral Lord Nelson belonged to the dispatch boat which first brought the news to the Admiralty in London.

A 1000-mile sea race from the location of the naval battle resulted between Lt. Lapenotiere in HMS Pickle and Captain Sykes in Nautilus with the Pickle reaching England first to deliver the dispatches to the Admiralty. For his outstanding effort in the race, Lt. Lapenotiere was awarded a cash prize of 500 pound sterling (equivalent to £36,000 in 2023) and, in addition, was promoted to Commander.

== Dispatch boats during the American Civil War ==
The American Civil War employed a large number of dispatch boats, such as Massasoit, Gladiolus and Geranium among numerous others. General Ulysses S. Grant depended on dispatch boats during his Virginia campaign to correspond with Union Navy ships on the James River.

== Dispatch boats during the late 19th and early 20th centuries ==
The US Navy did not have enough dispatch boats available during the Spanish–American War of 1898, so private yachts and tugboats used by newspapers were frequently tasked by the Navy to carry messages. USS Vega was a US dispatch boat during World War I.

== Demise of the dispatch boat ==
HMS Surprise (K346) was a Bay-class anti-aircraft frigate of the British Royal Navy. In commission from 1946 to 1965, she served in the Mediterranean Fleet as a Despatch Vessel for the Commander-in-Chief.

Dispatch boats became largely unnecessary with the advent of underwater cable and shipboard radio technology in the early 20th century. However, there was a brief reprise during the Falklands War in 1982. CS Iris, a cable laying ship owned by British Telecom, was taken up from trade by the British Government. She ferried supplies and dispatches (including troop's mail from home) between elements of the fleet and between Ascension Island and the Falkland Islands – she also recovered urgent supplies that were air-dropped in the South Atlantic by Royal Air Force, C-130 Hercules aircraft.

== Gallery ==
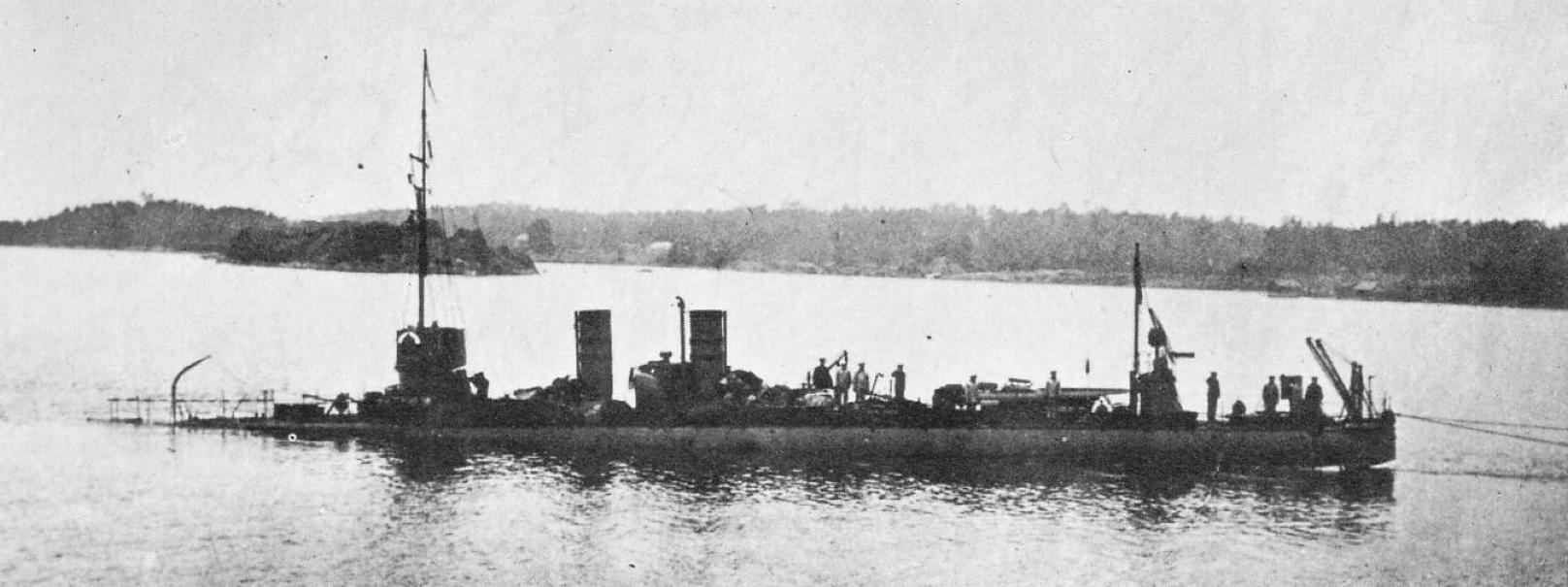
Imperial Russian dispatch boat No. 218 (former torpedo boat), after striking a mine in 1915

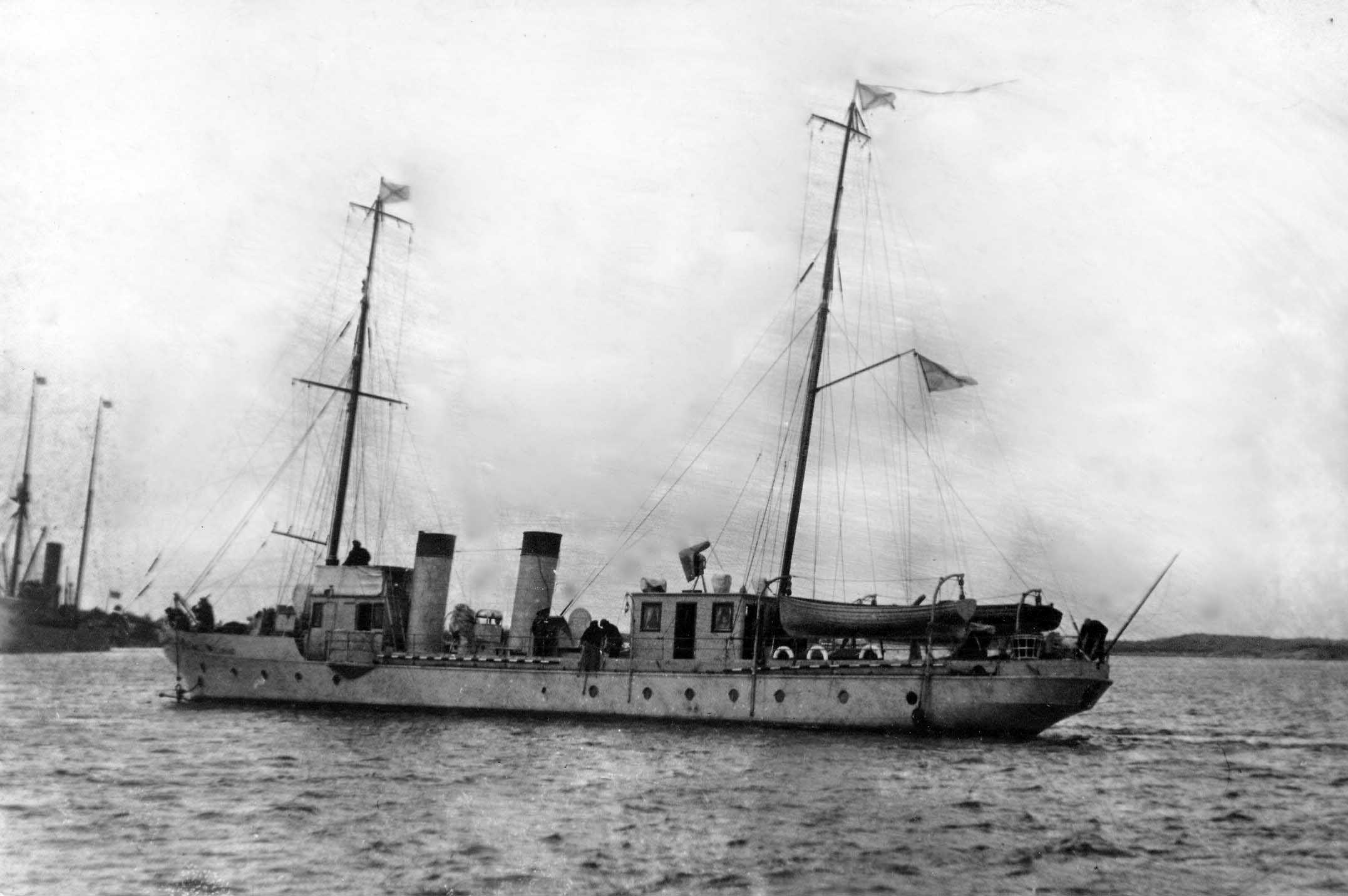
Imperial Russian dispatch boat Roksana

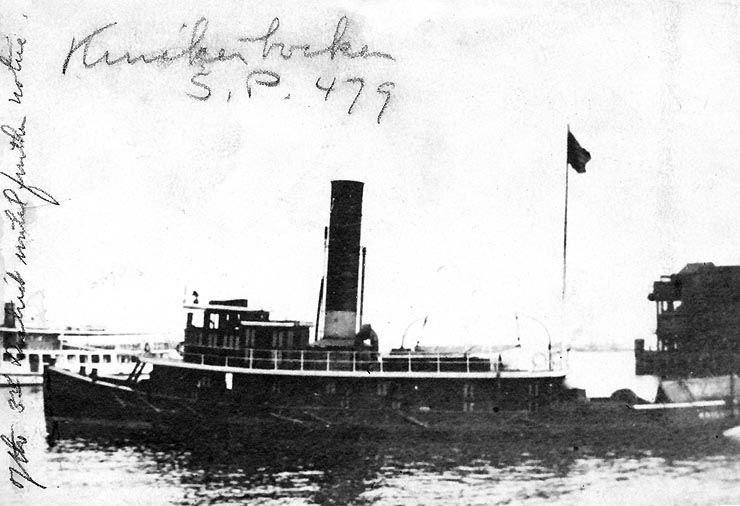
The tug Knickerbocker, prior to her United States Navy service as tug, minesweeper, and dispatch boat

== See also ==
- Mail steamer
- Aviso
- Mail-boat
