= 772 Naval Air Squadron =

Inactive flying squadron of the Royal Navy's Fleet Air Arm

- Squadron badge (1975)
- Active: 1939–1948; 1974–1995
- Disbanded: 29 September 1995
- Country: United Kingdom
- Branch: Royal Navy
- Type: Fleet Air Arm Second Line Squadron
- Role: Fleet Requirements Unit; Helicopter Support Squadron
- Size: Squadron
- Part of: Fleet Air Arm
- Home station: See Naval air stations section for full list.
- Aircraft: See Aircraft operated section for full list.

Insignia
- Squadron Badge Description: White, issuant from water barry wavy of four blue and white an arm embowed proper vested white the hand grasping a trident gold impaled thereon a twin-engined aircraft black (1942); Blue, a pair of wings displayed white surmounted by a trident and a shepherds crook in saltire gold (1975)
- Identification Markings: R3A+ (all types 1939-1941); K9A+ (all types 1942); M8A+ (all types from 1943); AR8A+ (all types from 1944); BR8A+ & BR0A+ (FRU School all types 1944-1945); 08A+ & 09A+ (all types from 1946); 501-509 (1947-1948); 510-517 (Wessex from September 1974); 610-617 (Wessex from March 1981); 610-617 (Sea King) (6)21-(6)28 (later on)
- Fin Shore Codes: AO (1947-1948); PO (from September 1974)

772 Naval Air Squadron (772 NAS), also known as 772 Squadron, is an inactive Fleet Air Arm (FAA) naval air squadron of the United Kingdom's Royal Navy (RN). It most recently operated the Westland Sea King HC.4 / Westland Commando, assault and utility transport helicopter between February 1988 and September 1995 at RNAS Portland.

772 Naval Air Squadron formed as a Fleet Requirements Unit out of 'Y' Flight from 771 Naval Air Squadron at RNAS Lee-on-Solent (HMS Daedalus) in September 1939. While the headquarters remained there, floatplanes were operated out of RNAS Portland (HMS Osprey), however, mid 1940 saw the whole squadron move north to RNAS Campbeltown and roughly twelve months afterwards the short distance to RNAS Machrihanish.

The unit moved to RNAS Ayr (HMS Wagtail) in July 1944 and became the Fleet Requirements Unit School. In January 1946 the squadron moved to RNAS Burscough (HMS Ringtail) in Lancashire, before moving to RNAS Anthorn (HMS Nuthatch) in Cumberland, in May. It became the Northern Fleet Requirements Unit upon moving to RNAS Arbroath (HMS Condor), in June 1947, but disbanded into 771 Naval Air Squadron in October.

772 Naval Air Squadron reformed as a Helicopter Support Squadron at RNAS Portland (HMS Osprey) in September 1974. In September 1977 the squadron took over responsibility for a number of Ships' Flights of Royal Fleet Auxiliary ships. The squadron was used to reform 848 Naval Air Squadron for the Falklands Task Force in 1982, with the Ships' Flights absorbed into 847 Naval Air Squadron. In August 1982 it took on the Anti-Submarine Warfare Flight from 737 Naval Air Squadron and between 1983 - 1985 a Search and Rescue Flight operated out of RNAS Lee-on-Solent.

== History ==
=== Fleet Requirements Unit (1939–1948) ===
772 Naval Air Squadron was formed on 28 September 1939, at RNAS Lee-on-Solent (HMS Daedalus), Hampshire, as a Fleet Requirements Unit, out of 'Y' Flight of 771 Naval Air Squadron. It initially operated four floatplane variants of the Fairey Swordfish torpedo bomber, out of RNAS Portland (HMS Osprey), Dorset, mainly in support of target towing for naval gunnery purposes. However, with the attack and sinking of the merchant ship converted to anti-aircraft ship HMS Foylebank, in Portland harbour, in July 1940, naval activity in the area was reduced. The same month then saw the squadron move north to Scotland and was based at RNAS Campbeltown in Argyll and then on 15 June 1941 it relocated the short distance to RNAS Machrihanish (HMS Landrail). The Fairey Swordfish were replaced by Blackburn Roc, a naval turret fighter aircraft. Tasks included radar calibration and height finding exercises, along with target-towing and photography. The squadron added Supermarine Walrus, an amphibious maritime patrol aircraft, to its strength, undertaking search and rescue operations.

During 1942, Fairey Fulmar, a carrier-based reconnaissance and fighter aircraft, Vought Chesapeake, an American carrier-based dive bomber and Boulton Paul Defiant were received and the Fairey Swordfish returned to the Squadron. 1943 saw the addition of Miles Martinet, a dedicated target tug aircraft and in 1944 the squadron received both Bristol Blenheim, a twin-engined light bomber, and Hawker Hurricane fighter aircraft. On 27 May 1944, the squadron undertook a dummy attack on the fleet as part of an exercise in preparation for the Normandy landings.

In July 1944, the squadron moved to RNAS Ayr (HMS Wagtail), in Ayrshire, where it operated a Fleet Requirements Unit School. Towards the end of 1944, it received Vought Corsair, an American carrier-based fighter bomber aircraft, Douglas Boston, an American light bomber and Fairey Firefly, a carrier-borne fighter and anti-submarine aircraft. The squadron had detachments based at RNAS Ronaldsway (HMS Urley), on the Isle of Man, in 1945 and that year also saw a significant change in aircraft types for the squadron, with only the Miles Martinet remaining from the initial types and the squadron receiving Grumman Wildcat, an American carrier-based fighter aircraft and de Havilland Mosquito, a multirole combat aircraft.

772 Naval Air Squadron moved to RNAS Burscough (HMS Ringtail), Lancashire, England, in January 1946. The Grumman Wildcat, which were part of the lend-lease scheme, were replaced with Supermarine Seafire, a navalised version of the Supermarine Spitfire fighter aircraft. Then on 3 May the squadron relocated to RNAS Anthorn (HMS Nuthatch), in the historic county of Cumberland, England. Here the squadron strength was sixteen aircraft, consisting two x Miles Martinet, six x Supermarine Seafire and eight x de Havilland Mosquito. It remained for just over twelve months before moving to RNAS Arbroath (HMS Condor), Angus, Scotland, on 26 June 1947. Here it was designated the Northern Fleet Requirements Unit and operated mainly de Havilland Mosquito PR.34. In October 1948 the squadron disbanded into 771 Naval Air Squadron.

=== Helicopter Support Squadron (1974–1995) ===
772 Naval Air Squadron reformed on 6 September 1974 at RNAS Portland (HMS Osprey). It was equipped with six Westland Wessex HAS. 1, a licence built Sikorsky H-34 utility and anti-submarine warfare helicopter. The squadron had a number of tasks, providing helicopter support to both local Royal Navy and foreign warships, local sea area search and rescue operations, and UK wide helicopter detachments for security exercises.

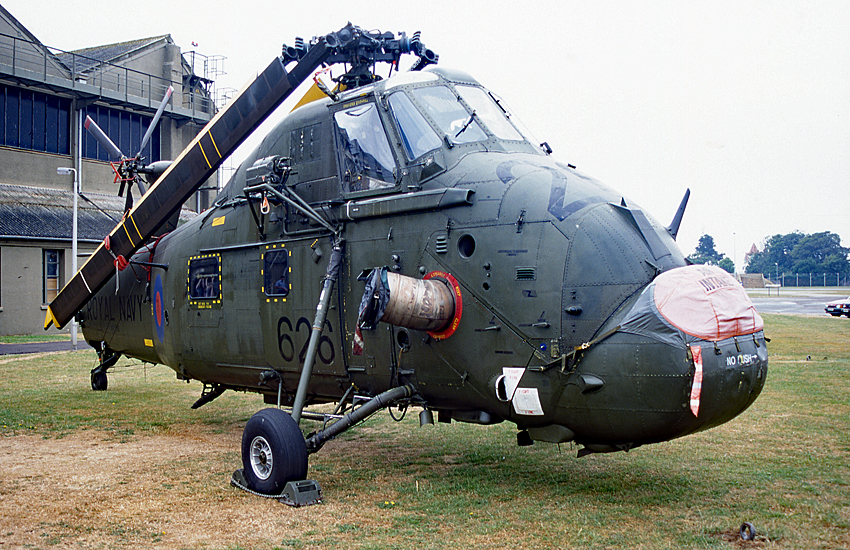
Westland WS58 Wessex HU.5 of 772 Squadron at HMS Daedelus

The squadron received Westland Wessex HU.5, a Royal Navy service troop transporter variant, replacing its HAS.1 in 1976. The following year 772 NAS took over parenting the Ships Flight's for three Royal Fleet Auxiliary (RFA) logistical and operational support ships, from 707 Naval Air Squadron: the Tide-class replenishment oiler RFA Tidepool, the armament stores ship RFA Resource, and the supply ship RFA Regent. Between 25 November and 19 December 1977, RFA Resource was involved in Operation Journeyman in the South Atlantic with its Westland Wessex equipped Flight embarked from 772 Naval Air Squadron.

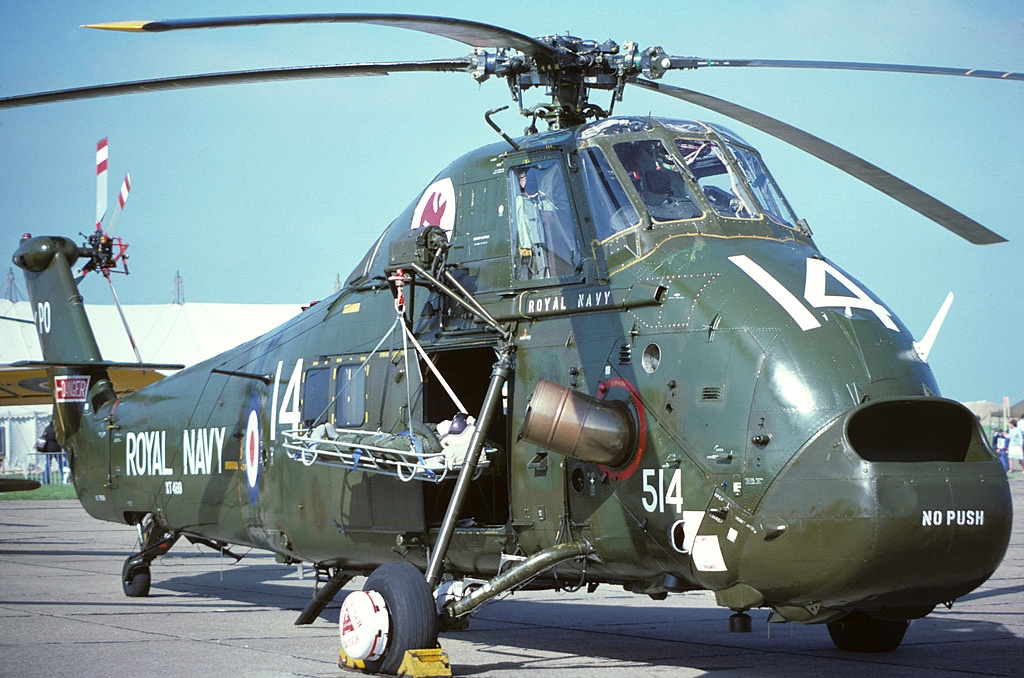
A Westland Wessex HU.5 of 772 NAS at RNAS Yeovilton during 1978

In 1982 parts of the squadron formed 848 Naval Air Squadron to increase the troop lift capability during the Falklands War with Westland Wessex HU.5. The three RFA Flights were used in part to form 847 Naval Air Squadron, however, when 737 Naval Air Squadron disbanded in February 1983, its Westland Wessex HAS.3, a Royal Navy anti-submarine version, were absorbed by 772 Naval Air Squadron.

The squadron was tasked with Search and Rescue operations between 1983 and 1985, and formed a 'C' Flight for which was based at RNAS Lee-on-Solent (HMS Daedalus). During 1988 the Westland Wessex were withdrawn and Westland Sea King HC.4, a licence-built version of the American Sikorsky S-61 helicopter by Westland, were received. This variant was also known as Westland Commando and included a fixed undercarriage with a larger cabin. 772 Naval Air Squadron operated for a further seven years and finally disbanded on 29 September 1995.

== Aircraft operated ==
The squadron operated a variety of different aircraft and versions:

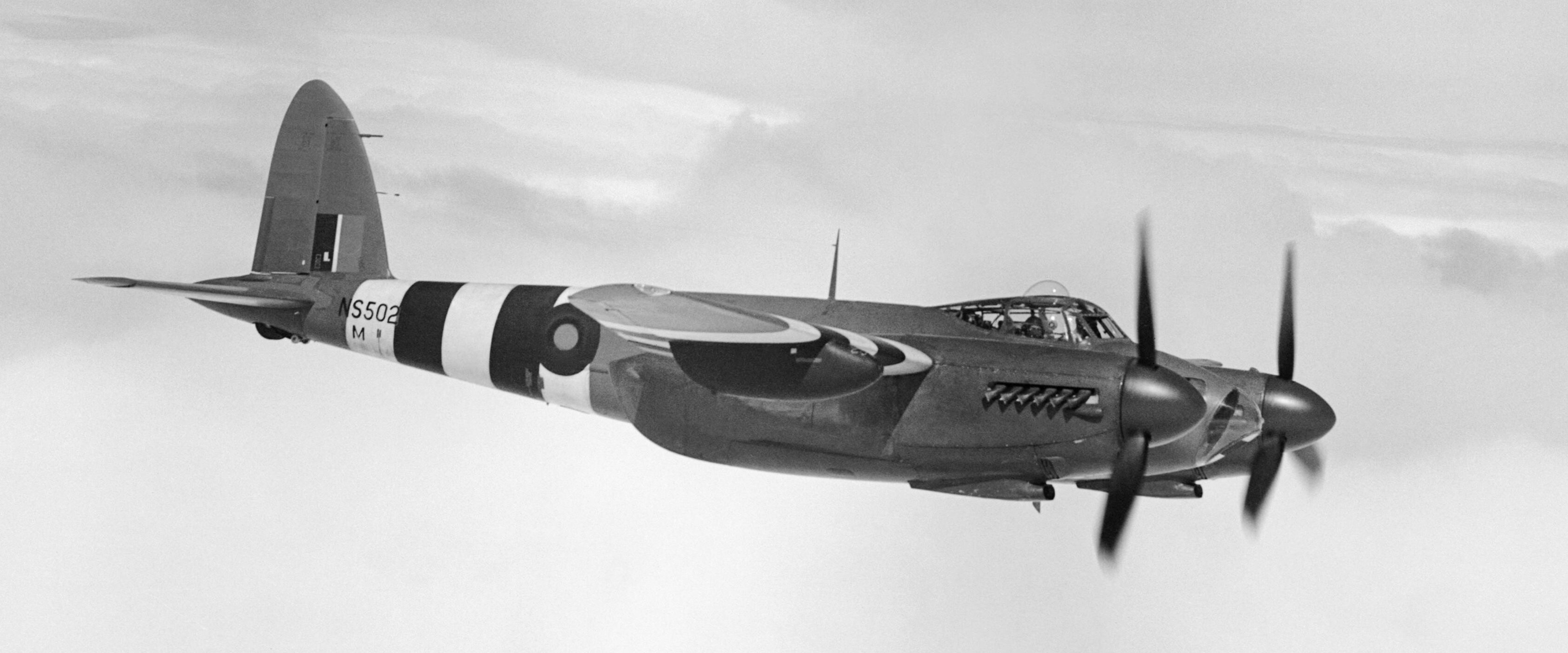
de Havilland Mosquito PR Mk XVI

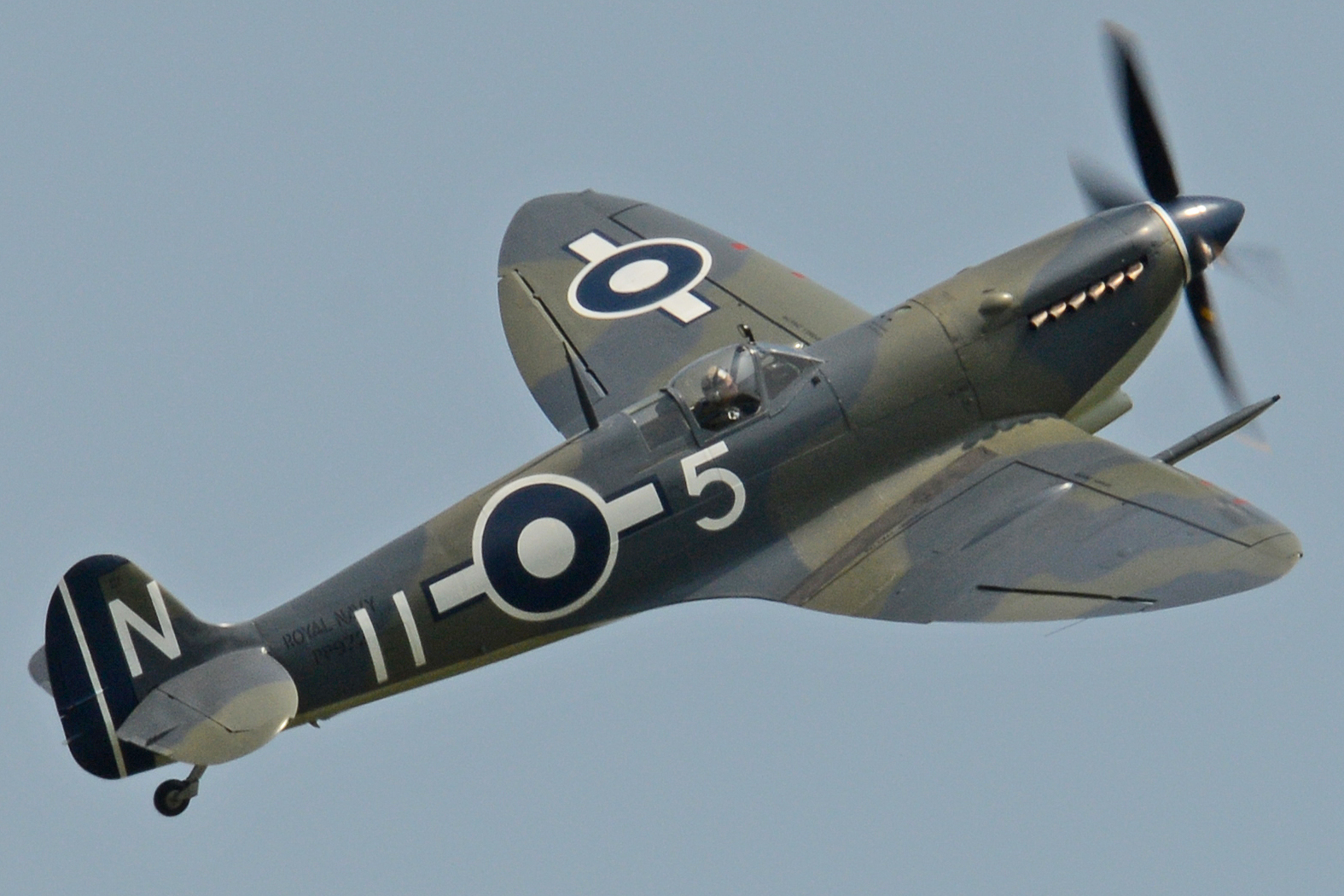
Supermarine Seafire LF.IIIc

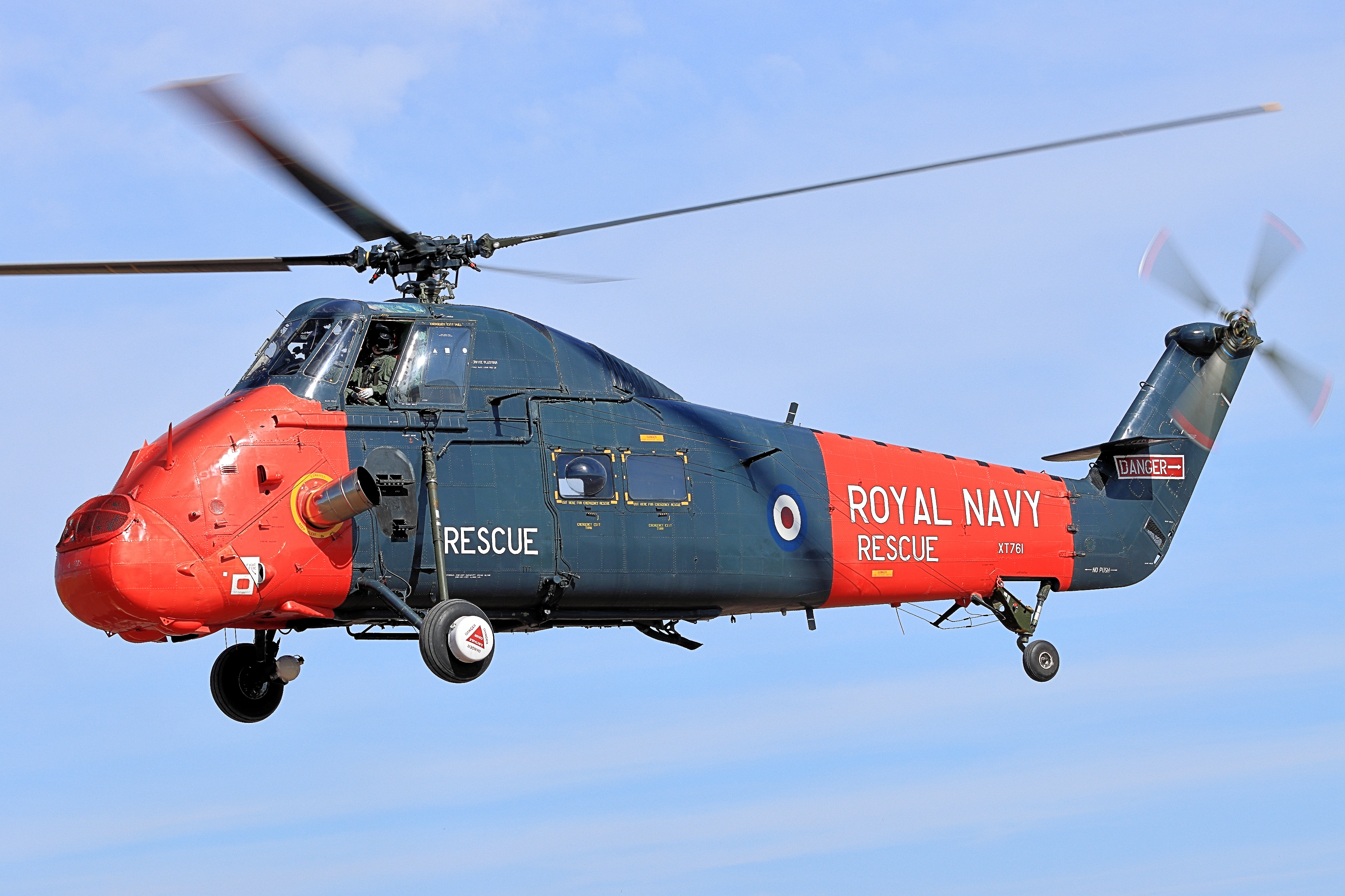
Westland Wessex

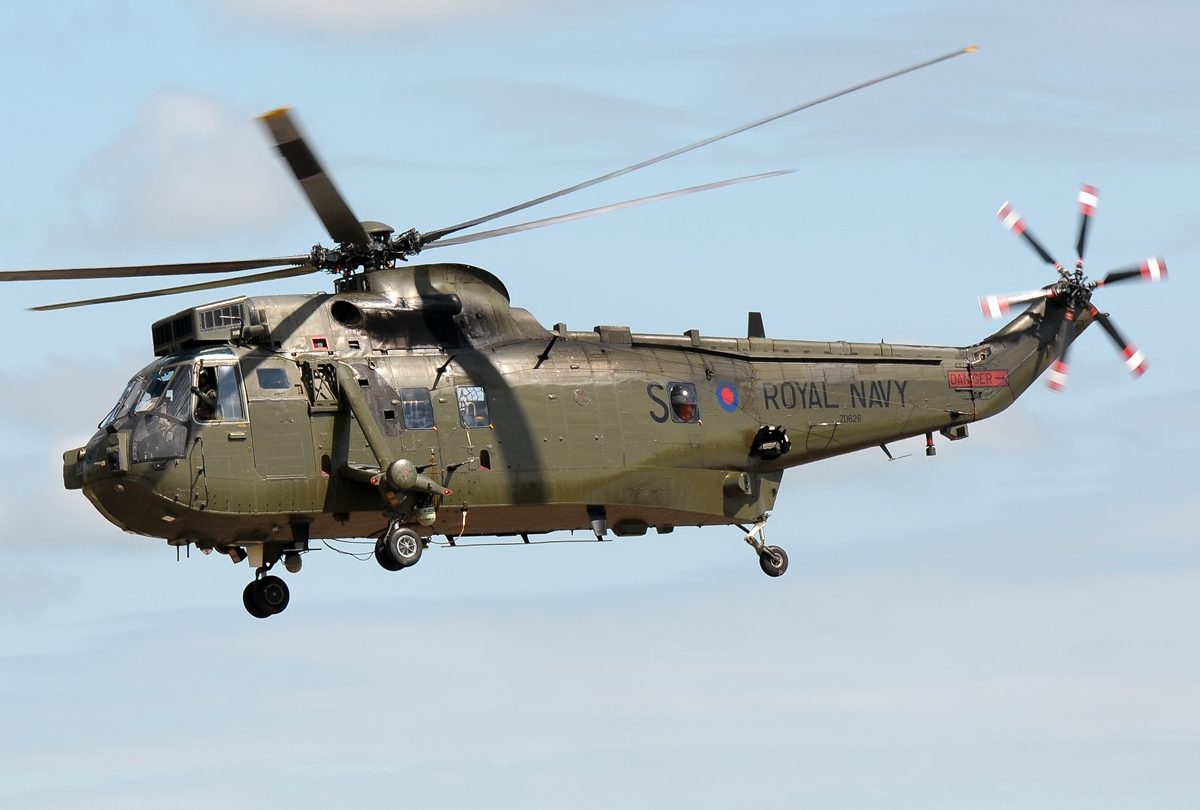
Westland Sea King HC.4

- Fairey Swordfish I torpedo bomber (September 1939 - July 1941)
- Blackburn Skua dive bomber and fighter aircraft (September 1940 - July 1944)
- Blackburn Roc fighter aircraft (July 1941 - April 1944)
- Percival Proctor II radio trainer (April 1942 - June 1943)
- Boulton Paul Defiant TT Mk I target tug (May 1942 - 1943)
- Vought Chesapeake Mk.I dive bomber (May 1942 - August 1943)
- Fairey Fulmar Mk.I reconnaissance/fighter aircraft (June - October 1942)
- Fairey Swordfish II torpedo bomber (October 1942 - August 1945)
- Fairey Fulmar Mk.II reconnaissance/fighter aircraft (August 1943 - June 1944)
- Miles Martinet TT.Mk I target tug (September 1943 - August 1946)
- Stinson Reliant I liaison and training aircraft (November 1943 - November 1945)
- Bristol Blenheim Mk.IV light bomber (February 1944 - April 1945)
- Hawker Hurricane Mk.IIC fighter aircraft (May 1944 - April 1945)
- Vought Corsair Mk III fighter bomber (September 1944 - 1945)
- Fairey Firefly NF. Mk II night fighter (September 1944 - April 1945)
- Fairey Firefly I fighter aircraft (September 1944 - February 1946)
- Douglas Boston Mk III light bomber (December 1944 - August 1945)
- Supermarine Sea Otter ABR.I amphibious maritime reconnaissance aircraft (December 1944 - November 1945)
- de Havilland Mosquito B Mk.25 bomber (May 1945 - August 1946)
- Miles Master II advanced trainer aircraft (July 1945)
- Grumman Martlet Mk IV fighter aircraft (September 1945 - )
- de Havilland Mosquito T Mk.III trainer aircraft (September 1945)
- Grumman Wildcat Mk V fighter aircraft (September 1945 - April 1946)
- de Havilland Mosquito PR Mk.XVI photo reconnaissance aircraft (October 1945 - 1946)
- Avro Anson I multi-role aircraft (November 1945 - August 1946)
- Bristol Beaufighter TF Mk.X torpedo fighter (1945)
- Supermarine Seafire L Mk III fighter aircraft (March - August 1946)
- de Havilland Mosquito PR Mk.34 photo reconnaissance aircraft (April 1946 - October 1948)
- Westland Wessex HAS.1 utility and anti-submarine warfare helicopter (September 1974 - July 1976)
- Westland Wessex HU.5 troop transport (February 1976 - March 1988)
- Westland Wessex HAS.3 anti-submarine variant (December 1982 - January 1984)
- Westland Sea King HC.4 / Westland Commando assault and utility transport helicopter (February 1988 - September 1995)

== Naval air stations ==
772 Naval Air Squadron operated from a number of naval air station of the Royal Navy, in the United Kingdom, a couple of Royal Navy Fleet Aircraft Carriers, Royal Fleet Auxiliary logistic and support ships and a number of Royal Air Force stations:

1939 - 1948

- Royal Naval Air Station Lee-on-Solent (HMS Daedalus), Hampshire, (HQ) (28 September 1939 - 14 July 1940)
- Royal Naval Air Station Portland (HMS Osprey), Dorset, (Aircraft) (28 September 1939 - 14 July 1940)
- Royal Naval Air Station Campbeltown (HMS Landrail), Argyll, (14 July 1940 - 15 June 1941)
- Royal Naval Air Station Machrihanish (HMS Landrail), Argyll and Bute, (15 June 1941 - 2 July 1944)
  - Royal Air Force Ballykelly, County Londonderry, (detachment 7 December 1942 - 5 February 1943)
- Royal Naval Air Station Ayr (HMS Wagtail), South Ayrshire, (2 July 1944 - 10 January 1946)
  - Royal Air Force Charterhall, Scottish Borders, (detachment 1–16 October 1945)
  - Royal Naval Air Station Arbroath (HMS Condor), Angus, (detachment 16 October 1945 - 10 June 1946)
- Royal Naval Air Squadron Burscough (HMS Ringtail), Lancashire, (10 January 1946 - 3 May 1936)
  - Royal Air Force Nutts Corner, County Antrim, (detachment February - March 1946)
  - Royal Air Force Andreas, Isle of Man, (detachment 7 March - 15 August 1946)
  - Royal Air Force Charterhall, Scottish Borders, (detachment 19 March - 18 August 1946)
- Royal Naval Air Station Anthorn (HMS Nuthatch), Cumbria, (3 May 1946 - 26 June 1947)
  - Royal Air Force Jurby, Isle of Man, (detachment 15 August - 21 December 1946)
- Royal Naval Air Station Arbroath (HMS Condor), Angus, (26 June 1947 - 13 October 1948)
- disbanded - (13 October 1948)

1974 - 1995

- Royal Naval Air Station Portland (HMS Osprey), Dorset, (6 September 1974 - 29 September 1995)
  - Royal Naval Air Station Prestwick (HMS Gannet), South Ayrshire, (detachment two helicopters 3–19 May 1978)
  - Royal Air Force Waddington, Lincolnshire, (detachment two helicopters 13–29 October 1981)
  - HMS Illustrious (detachment two helicopters 2–28 July 1982)
  - Royal Naval Air Station Lee-on-Solent (HMS Daedalus), Hampshire, (SAR detachment 14 February 1983 - 20 August 1985)
- disbanded - (29 September 1995)

=== 772B Flight ===
B Flight, 772 Naval Air Squadron, operated from a number of naval air station of the Royal Navy, in the United Kingdom and a Royal Air Force station:

- Royal Naval Air Station Ronaldsway (HMS Urley), Isle of Man (5 January 1945 - 17 April 1945)
- Royal Air Force Andreas, Isle of Man, (17 April 1945 - 6 September 1945)
- Royal Naval Air Station Ronaldsway (HMS Urley), Isle of Man, (6 September 1945 - 28 December 1945)
- Royal Naval Air Squadron Burscough (HMS Ringtail), Lancashire, (28 December 1945 - 10 January 1946)
- disbanded - (10 January 1946)

== Ships' Flights ==
772 Naval Air Squadron operated a number of ships' flights:

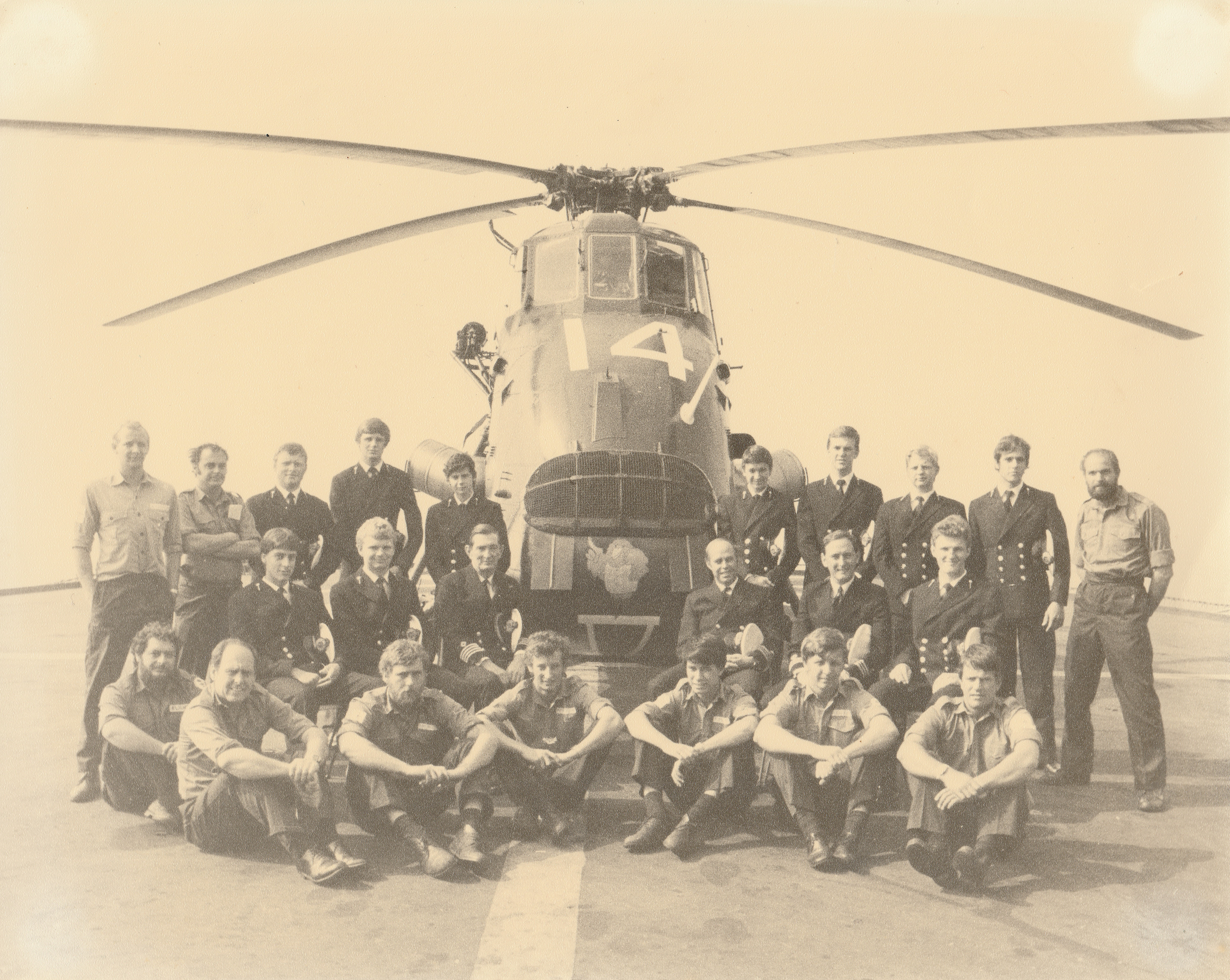
772 Naval Air Squadron, 'C' Flight, RFA Olna, March 1982

- RFA Tidepool (1977 - 1978)
- RFA Regent (1977 - 1981) / (1987)
- RFA Resource (1977 - 1982) / (1986)
- RFA Olmeda (1978)
- HMS Invincible (1980)
- HMS London (1980 - 1981)
- RFA Tidespring (1980) / (1982)
- RFA Olna (1981 - 1982)
- RFA Fort Grange (1986)

== Commanding officers ==
List of commanding officers of 772 Naval Air Squadron with date of appointment:

1939 - 1948

- Lieutenant Commander M.A. Everett, RN, from 28 September 1939
- Lieutenant Commander R.E.P. Miers, RN, from 16 November 1939
- Lieutenant Commander K.W. Beard, RN, from 6 September 1940
- Lieutenant Commander C.L. Hill, RN, from 26 May 1942
- Lieutenant Commander(A) A.C. Mills, RNVR, from 21 July 1942
- Lieutenant Commander(A) P.J. Connolly, RNVR, from 25 August 1943
- Lieutenant Commander C.R. Holman, RNR, from 11 September 1944
- Lieutenant Commander P. Snow, RN, from 16 July 1945
- Lieutenant D.M. Rouse, RN, from 17 June 1946
- Lieutenant F.G.B. Sheffield, DSC, RN, from 20 August 1946
- Lieutenant Commander C.H. Filmer, RN, from 15 January 1947
- Lieutenant W.C. Larkins, RN, from 8 September 1948
- disbanded - 13 October 1948

1974 - 1995

- Lieutenant Commander N.H. Burbury, AFC, RN, from 6 September 1974
- Lieutenant Commander J.A. Holt, RN, from 18 December 1975
- Lieutenant Commander P.G. Syer, RN, from 5 January 1978
- Lieutenant Commander P. Barton, RN, from 25 May 1979
- Lieutenant Commander N.J. de Hartog, AFC, RN, from 16 April 1981
- Lieutenant Commander B.M. Brock, RN, from 18 December 1981
- Lieutenant Commander R.M. Evans MVO, RN, from 20 October 1983
- Lieutenant Commander A.R. Smith, RN, from 3 December 1985
- Lieutenant Commander N.D. Arnall-Culliford, AFC, RN, from 10 September 1987
- Lieutenant Commander R. Lamb, RN, from 28 February 1990
- Lieutenant Commander N.A. King, RN, from 12 December 1990
- Lieutenant Commander E.A. McNair, AFC, RN, from 4 March 1993, (Commander 30 June 1995)
- disbanded - 29 September 1995

=== 772B Flight ===
List of commanding officers of B Flight, 772 Naval Air Squadron, with date of appointment:

- Lieutenant(A) A.R. Linstead, RNVR, from 8 January 1945
- Lieutenant(A) I.H.M. Gunn, RNVR, from 17 April 1945
- not identified - 24 September 1945
- disbanded - 10 January 1946

Note: Abbreviation (A) signifies Air Branch of the RN or RNVR.

== See also ==
- History of Royal Navy Helicopter Search and Rescue
