= 707 Naval Air Squadron =

Inactive flying squadron of the Royal Navy's Fleet Air Arm

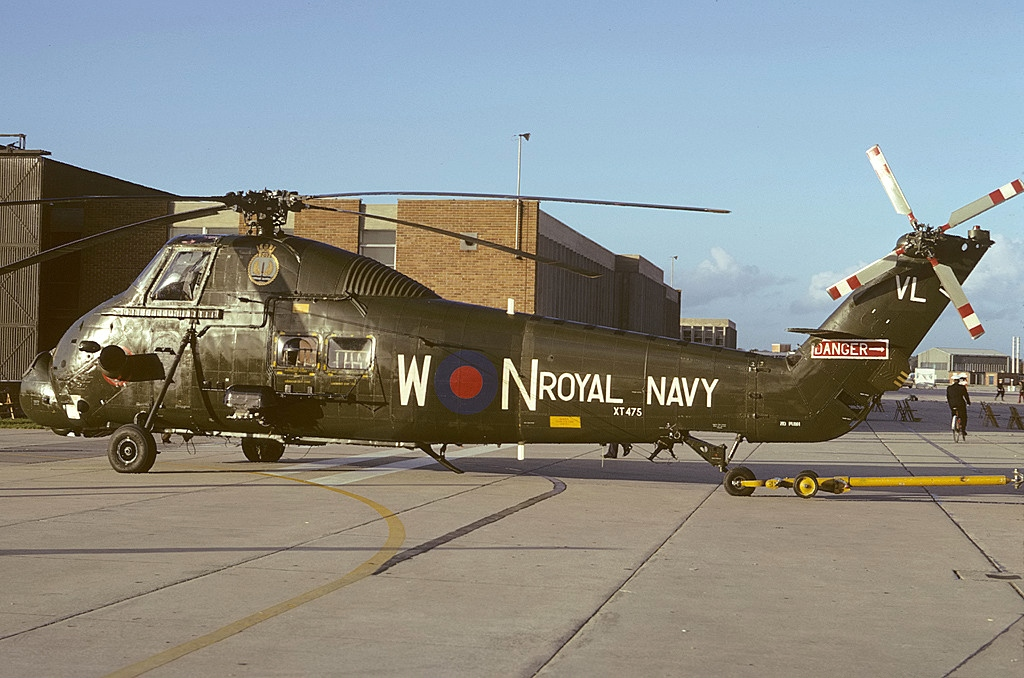
- A Westland Wessex HU.5 of 707 NAS at RNAS Yeovilton during 1974
- Active: 1945; 1964–1995
- Disbanded: 9 February 1995
- Country: United Kingdom
- Branch: Royal Navy
- Type: Fleet Air Arm Second Line Squadron
- Role: Radar Trials Unit; Advanced and Operational Flying Training (AFT/ OFT) Commando helicopter squadron
- Size: Squadron
- Part of: Fleet Air Arm
- Home station: See Naval air stations section for full list.

Insignia
- Identification Markings: O7A+ (Swordfish); O8A+ (Barrcuda); AH8A+ (Avenger); M-Z (Wessex single letters to July 1971); WA-WB, WM-WZ (to April 1982); ZA+ (Wessex / Sea King from 1982)
- Fin Shore Codes: CU (1964 – 1972); VL (1972 – 1995)

Aircraft flown
- Bomber: Fairey Swordfish; Fairey Barracuda; Grumman Avenger
- Multirole helicopter: Westland Wessex; Westland Sea King
- Trainer: Avro Anson

707 Naval Air Squadron (707 NAS), also known as 707 Squadron, is an inactive Fleet Air Arm (FAA) naval air squadron of the United Kingdom’s Royal Navy (RN). It most recently operated Westland Sea King HC.4 troop transport helicopter between October 1983 and February 1995, later based at RNAS Yeovilton, Somerset.

The unit was operational during the Second World War, having been established in February 1945 under the designation of Radar Trials Unit and subsequently disbanded in October of that year. It was reformed in December 1964 as an Advanced and Operational Flying Training (AFT/OFT) Commando helicopter squadron.

== History ==
=== Radar Trials Unit (1945) ===
707 Naval Air Squadron formed at RNAS Burscough (HMS Ringtail), Lancashire, on 20 February 1945, out of 'B' Flight of 735 Naval Air Squadron, as a Radar Trials Unit. HMS Ringtail was the home to the Naval School of Airborne Radar, and was responsible for airborne radar, including both air-to-surface-vessel (ASV) and aircraft interception (AI) radars, and also the airborne radar training of aircrews.

The squadron was initially equipped with Fairey Swordfish biplane torpedo bomber aircraft, Fairey Barracuda torpedo and dive bomber aircraft and Grumman Avenger, an American torpedo bomber, these were later augmented with radar-equipped Avro Anson, a British twin-engine, multi-role aircraft. The squadron moved to RNAS Gosport (HMS Siskin), Hampshire, on 14 August 1945, and then later disbanded, being merged into 778 Naval Air Squadron in October.

=== Advanced and Operational Flying Training (1964-1995) ===
707 Naval Air Squadron was reformed in December 1964, at RNAS Culdrose (HMS Seahawk), Cornwall, out of the disbanded 847 Naval Air Squadron. Operating with Westland Wessex HU.5 helicopter, a British licence-built development of the American Sikorsky H-34 helicopter, it was tasked as an Advanced and Operational Flying Training (AFT/ OFT) Commando helicopter squadron. Its primary task was teaching to Royal Navy and Royal Marines Commando pilots but it was also responsible for communications work, development flying and weapons trials. It also trained Westland Wessex helicopter aircrew for operation in Royal Fleet Auxiliary ships and took part in exercises with Army units.

The squadron relocated to RNAS Yeovilton (HMS Heron), Somerset, in May 1972. In the summer of 1974 it picked up search and rescue duties and in the July, the Red Dragon Flight was formed. The Flight was equipped with two helicopters and it provided a three-month long conversion course for HRH Prince Charles, The Prince of Wales. Upon conclusion it transferred to 845 Naval Air Squadron, along with His Royal Highness.

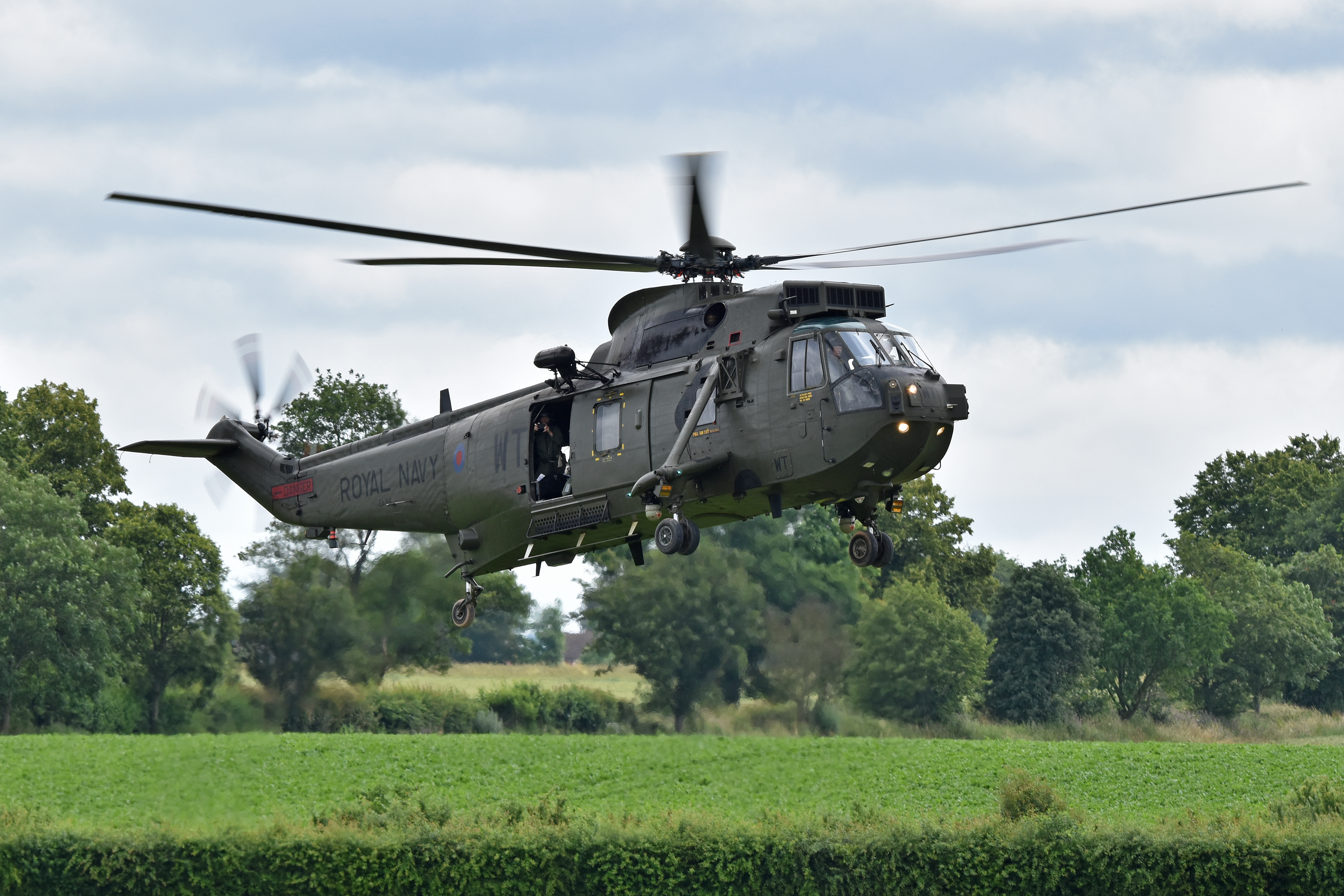
Westland Sea King HC.4 ‘ZA314 WT’ (G-CMDO), which saw part of its operational service with 707 NAS

In April 1982, 848 Naval Air Squadron reformed out of a large part of 707 Naval Air Squadron and then the former saw active service during the Falklands War. The squadron re-equipped with Westland Sea King HC.4 helicopter, a British licence-built version of the American Sikorsky S-61 helicopter, from October 1983 and eventually the Wessex Commando training was moved onto 771 Naval Air Squadron, in September 1985. Mountain flying training included detachments to Landsberg-Lech Air Base in Bavaria, in Germany and locations around Saint-Raphaël, Var and Saillagouse in southern France. Military and weapons training detachments were home based at Castlemartin Training Area and Dartmoor Training Area (DTA), and Deck Landing Practice was done using Royal Fleet Auxiliary ships.

707 Naval Air Squadron again provided support for 848 Naval Air Squadron which deployed during the Gulf War, with personnel and helicopters. In October 1993 it also deployed three helicopters to RAF Aldergrove, Northern Ireland, in support of security operations, but this was withdrawn when 846 Naval Air Squadron took the role on in April 1994. In February 1995 the squadron disbanded becoming 848 Naval Air Squadron.

== Aircraft flown ==
The squadron operated a variety of different aircraft and versions:

- Fairey Swordfish II biplane torpedo bomber (February - September 1945)
- Fairey Swordfish III biplane torpedo bomber (February - September 1945)
- Fairey Barracuda Mk II carrier-borne torpedo and dive bomber (February - September 1945)
- Fairey Barracuda Mk III carrier-borne torpedo and dive bomber
- Avro Anson Mk I multi-role aircraft (February - September 1945)
- Grumman Avenger Mk.III torpedo bomber (April - September 1945)
- Westland Wessex HU.5 troop transport helicopter (December 1964 - April 1982, May 1982 - September 1985)
- Westland Sea King HC.4 troop transport helicopter (October 1983 - February 1995)

== Naval air stations and other airbases ==
707 Naval Air Squadron operated from a number of naval air stations of the Royal Navy and Royal Air Force stations, in the United Kingdom and overseas:

1945

- Royal Naval Air Station Burscough (HMS Ringtail), Lancashire, (20 February 1945 - 14 August 1945)
- Royal Naval Air Station Gosport (HMS Siskin), Hampshire, (14 August 1945 - 1 October 1945)
- disbanded (1 October 1945)

1964 - 1995

- Royal Naval Air Station Culdrose (HMS Seahawk), Cornwall, (9 September 1964 - 15 May 1972)
  - Royal Air Force Detmold, North Rhine-Westphalia, Germany, (Detachment eight helicopters 29 April - 13 May 1971)
- Royal Naval Air Station Yeovilton (HMS Heron), Somerset, (15 May 1972 - 9 February 1995)
  - Royal Air Force Aldergrove, County Antrim, (Detachment three helicopters, ‘Z' Flight, 1 October 1993 - 31 March 1994)
  - Omagh Forward Operating Base (FOB), County Tyrone, (18 October 1993 - 21 March 1994)
- disbanded became 848 Naval Air Squadron (9 February 1995)

== Ship Flights ==
707 Naval Air Squadron operated a number of ships’ flights:

- RFA Resource (July 1966 - May 1972) / (November 1975 - September 1977)
- RFA Regent (March 1967 - May 1972) / (November 1975 - September 1977)
- RFA Tidespring (September 1975 - May 1976)
- RFA Olna (May - December 1976)
- RFA Tidepool (January - September 1977)

== Commanding officers ==
List of commanding officers of 707 Naval Air Squadron with date of appointment:

1945

- Lieutenant Commander(A) S.S. Laurie RNVR from 20 February 1945
- disbanded (1 October 1945)

1964 - 1994

- Lieutenant Commander D.J. Lickfold, MBE, RN from 9 December 1964
- Lieutenant Commander P.J. Craig, RN from 14 June 1965
- Lieutenant Commander P.D. Deller, RN from 21 February 1966
- Lieutenant Commander B.B. Hartwell, RN from 6 September 1967
- Lieutenant Commander N.S. Foster, RN from 12 March 1969
- Lieutenant Commander R.E. Smith, MBE, RN from 1 June 1970
- Lieutenant Commander G.S. Clarke, RN from 25 February 1972
- Lieutenant Commander P.A. Voute, RN from 21 August 1973
- Lieutenant Commander R.F. Sheriff, RN from 19 December 1974
- Lieutenant Commander P.J.W. Stevens, RN from 24 June 1976
- Lieutenant Commander M. Kenworthy, RN from 6 March 1978
- Lieutenant Commander S.C. Thornewill, RN from 15 April 1980
- Lieutenant Commander D.E.P. Baston, RN from 18 November 1981
- Lieutenant Commander N.P.R. Maddox, RN from 12 May 1982
- Lieutenant Commander D.E.P. Baston, AFC, RN from 1 July 1982
- Lieutenant Commander S Radley, RN from 1 June 1984
- Lieutenant Commander J Beattie, RN from 17 June 1986
- Lieutenant Commander G.R.N. Foster, RN from 8 November 1988
- Lieutenant Commander R.I. Horton AFC, RN from 9 October 1990
- Lieutenant Commander D.A. Lord MBE, RN from 29 September 1993
- became 848 Naval Air Squadron - 9 February 1995

Note: Abbreviation (A) signifies Air Branch of the RN or RNVR.
