= RFA Resource =

1967 Armament stores ship of the Royal Fleet Auxiliary

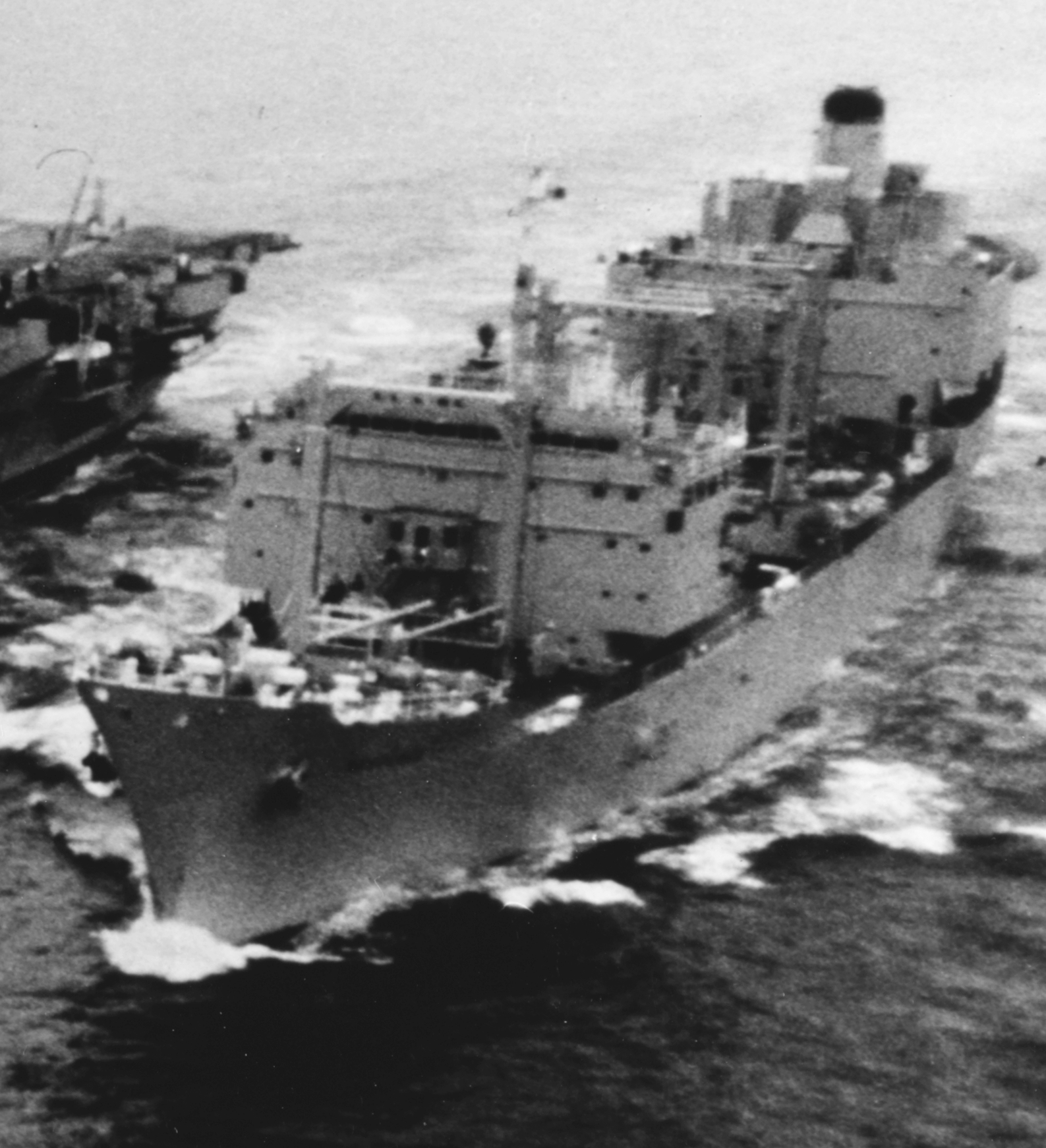
- RFA Resource (A480) cruises next to HMS Eagle, during "Operation Peacekeeper" on 24 September 1969.

History

United Kingdom
- Name: RFA Resource
- Ordered: 24 January 1963
- Laid down: 19 June 1964
- Launched: 11 February 1966
- Commissioned: 6 June 1967
- Decommissioned: 1 May 1997
- Renamed: Resourceful in 1997
- Stricken: 1997
- Identification: IMO number: 6717423; Pennant number: A480
- Honours and awards: Falkland Islands 1982. Kuwait 1991.
- Fate: Scrapped at Alang in 1997

General characteristics
- Class & type: Regent-class armament stores ship
- Displacement: 22,890 tons full load
- Length: 640 ft 1 in (195.10 m)
- Beam: 77 ft 1.25 in (23.50 m)
- Draught: 26 ft 3 in (8.00 m)
- Propulsion: 2 × AEI steam turbines DR geared to a single shaft; 2 × watertube boilers.
- Speed: 20 knots (37 km/h)
- Complement: 125 RFA personnel; 44 RNSTS personnel; 11 Naval Air dept
- Aircraft carried: 1 × Wessex 5 helicopter
- Aviation facilities: Landing platform capable of landing several different classes of helicopter

RFA Resource was an armament stores ship of the Royal Fleet Auxiliary (RFA), the naval auxiliary fleet of the United Kingdom.

== Falklands War ==
Resource served in the Falklands War, captained at that time by Captain Bruce Seymour. She was one of the first vessels on the scene to pick up survivors from HMS Sheffield, having just supplied her.

RFA Resource was one of several RFA munitions replenishment ships certified to store and supply the fleet with munitions, including WE.177A live nuclear weapons. Other ships capable of carrying (stored in deep magazines) or deploying these weapons were HMS Hermes, HMS Invincible, HMS Broadsword and HMS Brilliant, they were transferred to various Royal Fleet Auxiliary ships with their specialist magazines. This was initially RFA Regent, and when RFA Resource exited San Carlos, they were transferred to her, and then to RFA Fort Austin. After the end of the conflict they were transported back to Britain aboard RFA Fort Austin and RFA Resource. Inert practice weapons and surveillance weapons without fissionable material were also transported.

== Yugoslavia ==
One of Resource's last duties before being decommissioned was to serve as a floating munitions storage for UN and IFOR troops in the former Yugoslavia. She spent much of the mid 1990s in Split, Croatia, fulfilling this role.

== Decommissioning and scrapping ==
Resource sailed from Devonport on 24 June 1997, having been renamed Resourceful for the delivery run to the Indian breakers, and arrived at Alang for scrapping on 20 August 1997.

RFA Resource ship's badge.

== Footnotes ==
- Guardian Article mentioning RFA Resource - https://www.theguardian.com/uk/2002/feb/25/falklands.military
- Images of RFA Resource and a Wessex Helicopter - http://www.john.fotoblog.org.uk/p14552235.html%5B%5D
- Images and information about RFA Resource and sister ship Regent - https://web.archive.org/web/20061212183624/http://www.btinternet.com/~warship/Feature/rfa/pics2.htm
- Hansard entry mentioning final fate of RFA Resource - https://publications.parliament.uk/pa/cm200203/cmhansrd/vo030227/text/30227w04.htm
- Falklands day by day from Royal Navy - http://www.navynews.co.uk/falklands/day_april.asp
