= Morayvia =

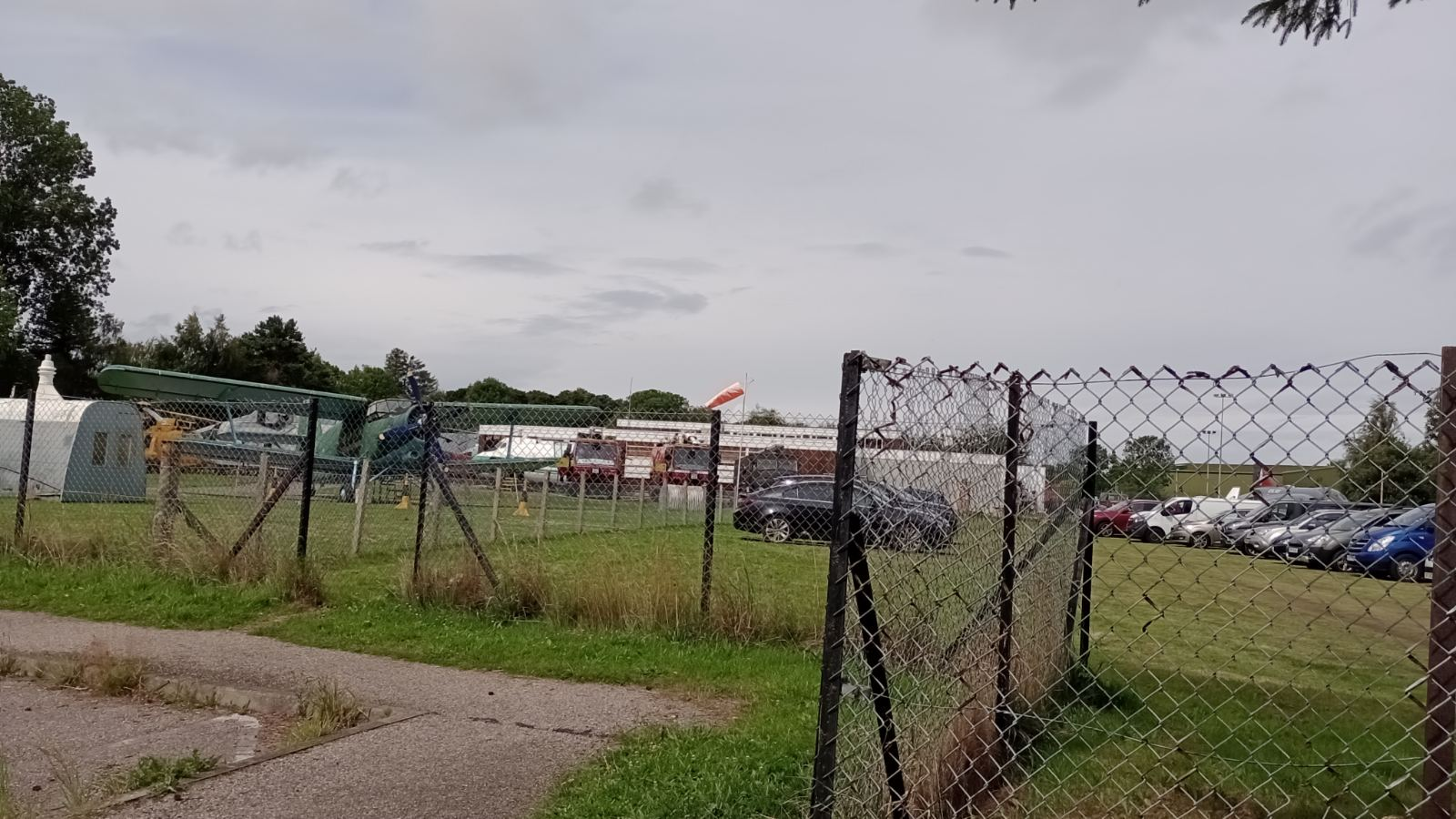
- Morayvia Aviation Museum

- Location within Moray
- Established: 26 July 2011
- Location: Kinloss, Moray, Scotland
- Coordinates: 57°38′03″N 3°33′24″W
- Type: Aviation museum
- Website: www.morayvia.org.uk

Morayvia is an aviation museum located in Kinloss, Moray, Scotland near to Kinloss Barracks (the former RAF Kinloss) a frontline Royal Air Force station.

== Exhibits ==
Exhibits:

- Antonov An-2 Red 14
- Avro Vulcan B.2 XH563 (cockpit)
- BAC Jet Provost T.4 XS176 (cockpit - added October 2012)
- de Havilland Vampire T.11 XD425 (cockpit - added April 2013)
- English Electric Lightning F1.A XM169
- Handley Page HPR.7 Herald 214 Series
- Hawker Siddeley Nimrod XV240 (forward fuselage)
- Hawker Siddeley Nimrod MR.2 XV244 (cockpit)
- Hawker Hunter F.5 WN957
- Panavia Tornado GR.1 XZ630
- SEPECAT Jaguar GR.3 XZ113
- Vickers Valiant XD875 (cockpit)
- Westland Dragonfly HR.5 WP495/G-AJOV
- Westland Whirlwind HAR.10 XJ723
- Westland Wessex HC.2 XR528
- Westland Wessex HU.5 XT466
- Westland Sea King HAR.3 XZ592
