= RFA Regent =

1967 Armament stores ship of the Royal Fleet Auxiliary

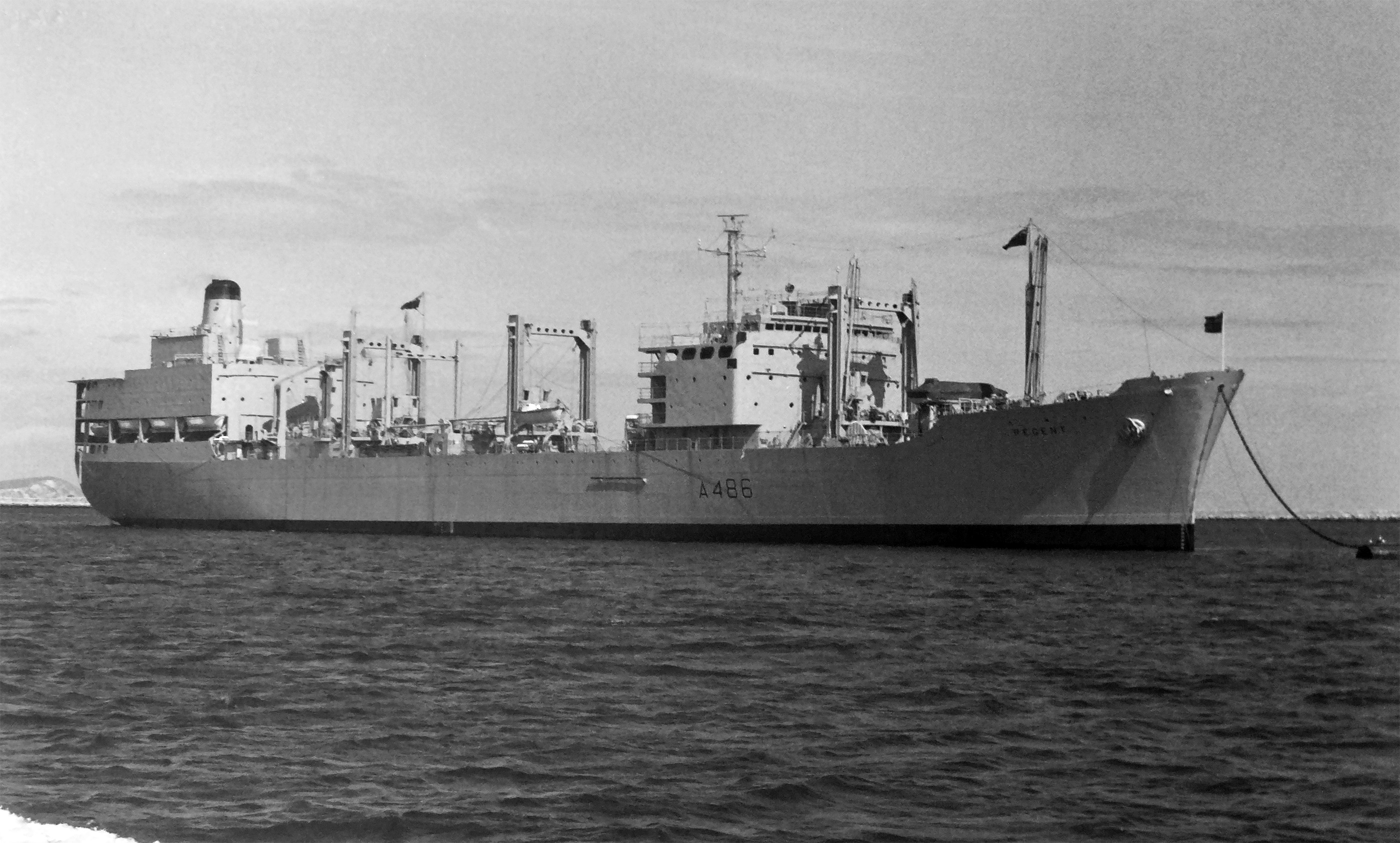
- RFA Regent (A486) in 1967

History

United Kingdom
- Name: RFA Regent
- Ordered: 24 January 1963
- Builder: Harland & Wolff
- Yard number: 1658
- Laid down: 4 September 1964
- Launched: 9 March 1966
- Completed: 6 June 1967
- Commissioned: 16 May 1967
- Decommissioned: October 1992
- Identification: IMO number: 6712112; pennant number A486
- Honours and awards: Falklands 1982
- Fate: Scrapped, 1993

General characteristics
- Displacement: 22,890 long tons (23,257 t) full load
- Length: 195.1 m (640 ft 1 in)
- Beam: 23.5 m (77 ft 1 in)
- Draught: 8 m (26 ft 3 in)
- Propulsion: 2 × Water-tube boilers; 2 × AEI steam turbines DR geared to a single shaft
- Speed: 20 knots (37 km/h; 23 mph)
- Complement: 125 RFA + 44 RNSTS + 11 Naval Air Detachment
- Aircraft carried: 1 × Wessex HU5 helicopter until April 1987

RFA Regent (A486) was an ammunition, explosives and stores supply ship in the Royal Fleet Auxiliary (RFA). She was built by Harland & Wolff, commissioned in 1967 and took part in the Falklands War.

== Service ==
She helped evacuate British nationals from Cyprus during the Turkish invasion 1974.

After taking on stores at Glen Douglas and Plymouth, RFA Regent sailed from Plymouth on 19 April 1982 for Operation Corporate arriving in the Total Exclusion Zone (TEZ) on 8 May. She was one of the last to return home arriving back on 15 September 1982. She was also deployed for the first Gulf War in 1991.

Regent was decommissioned in October 1992. She sailed from Devonport on 21 January 1993 under the name Shahzadelal, for the delivery run to the Indian breakers. She arrived at Alang for scrapping on 19 February 1993.
