= Westland Wessex =

1958 military helicopter family by Westland

Wessex
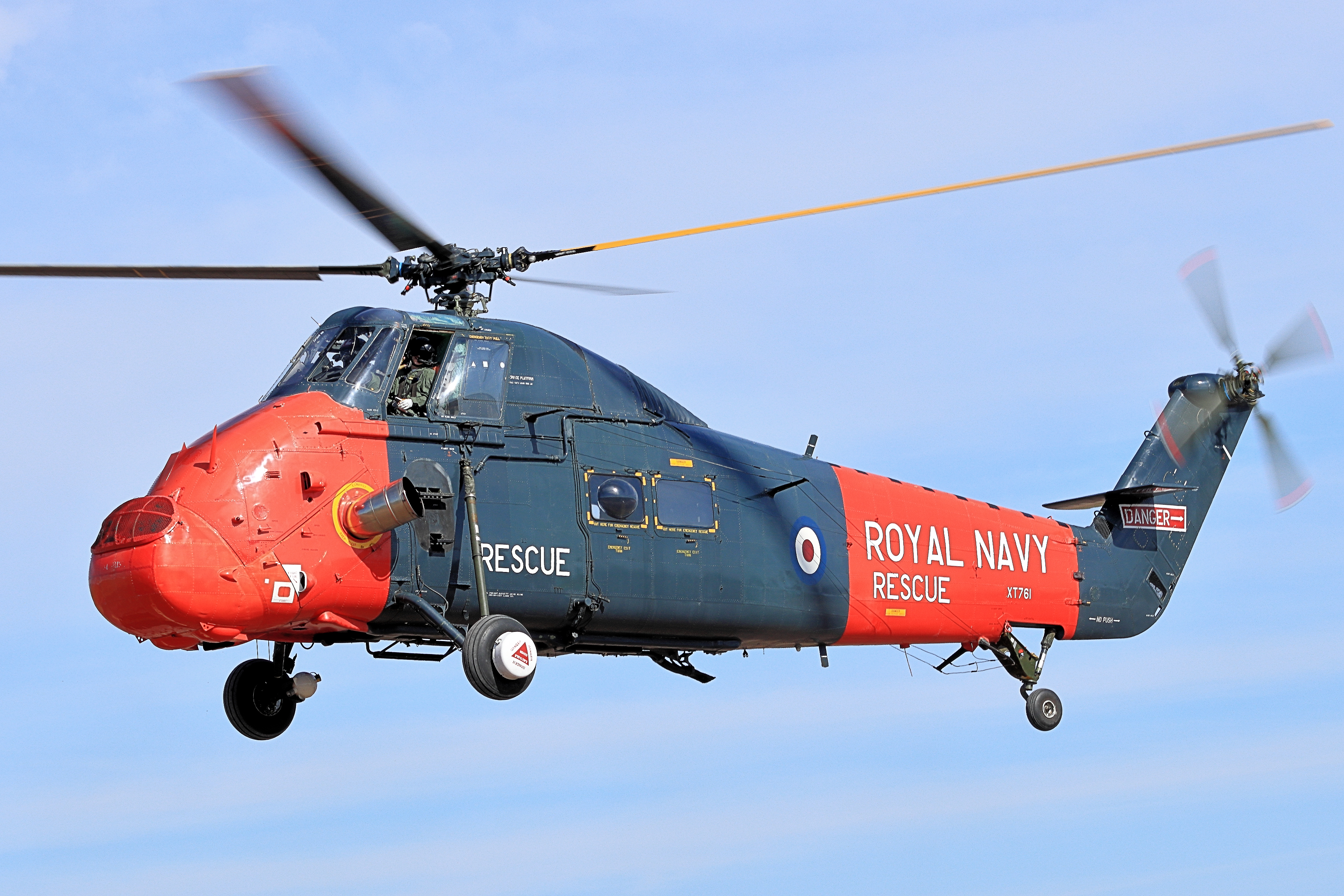
- Former Royal Navy Wessex HU.5 of the Historic Helicopters Collection, in 2022

General information
- Type: Helicopter
- National origin: United Kingdom
- Manufacturer: Westland Aircraft; Westland Helicopters
- Primary users: Royal Navy Royal Air Force; Royal Australian Navy; Uruguayan Naval Aviation
- Number built: 382

History
- Manufactured: 1958–1970
- Introduction date: 1961
- First flight: 20 June 1958
- Retired: 2003 (Royal Air Force)
- Developed from: Sikorsky S-58

The Westland Wessex is an early turbine-powered helicopter produced by the British rotorcraft specialist Westland Aircraft (later Westland Helicopters). It was an under licence development of the piston-engined Sikorsky S-58.

During the mid-1950s, Westland arranged with the American helicopter manufacturer Sikorsky Aircraft to demonstrate one of its S-58s in Britain to garner sales. Having secured an order from the Royal Navy (RN), Westland implemented several modifications to the S-58 design ahead of quantity production in the UK. One major change from Sikorsky's S-58 was the replacement of the piston-engine powerplant with a turboshaft engine; while early models were powered by a single Napier Gazelle engine, later builds used a pair of de Havilland Gnome engines. The use of a turboshaft engine was credited with increasing payload capacity while reducing both vibration and noise levels.

The Wessex was first introduced by the RN in 1961; it was the service's first purpose-build anti-submarine helicopter. Multiple variants of the type were introduced, including more capable anti-submarine models (enabling early Wessex HAS.1s to be reassigned to search and rescue (SAR) duties) and a dedicated battlefield transportation variant, the Wessex HU.5; the latter was equipped with two Gnome engines that provided double the power of the HAS.1's single powerplant. The Royal Air Force (RAF) also opted to procure the Wessex, using it for troop-transport, air ambulance and ground support missions; it was the first RAF helicopter that was suitable for instrument flight and thus night-time operations. Several sales also made to overseas customers; several overseas military services flew the Wessex, including the Royal Australian Navy, the Brunei Air Wing, and the Sultan of Oman's Air Force amongst others. Furthermore, a limited number of civilian rotorcraft were also produced. In British services, the Wessex had an operational service life in excess of 40 years, the last examples in Britain being withdrawn during 2003.

== Design and development ==
=== Background ===
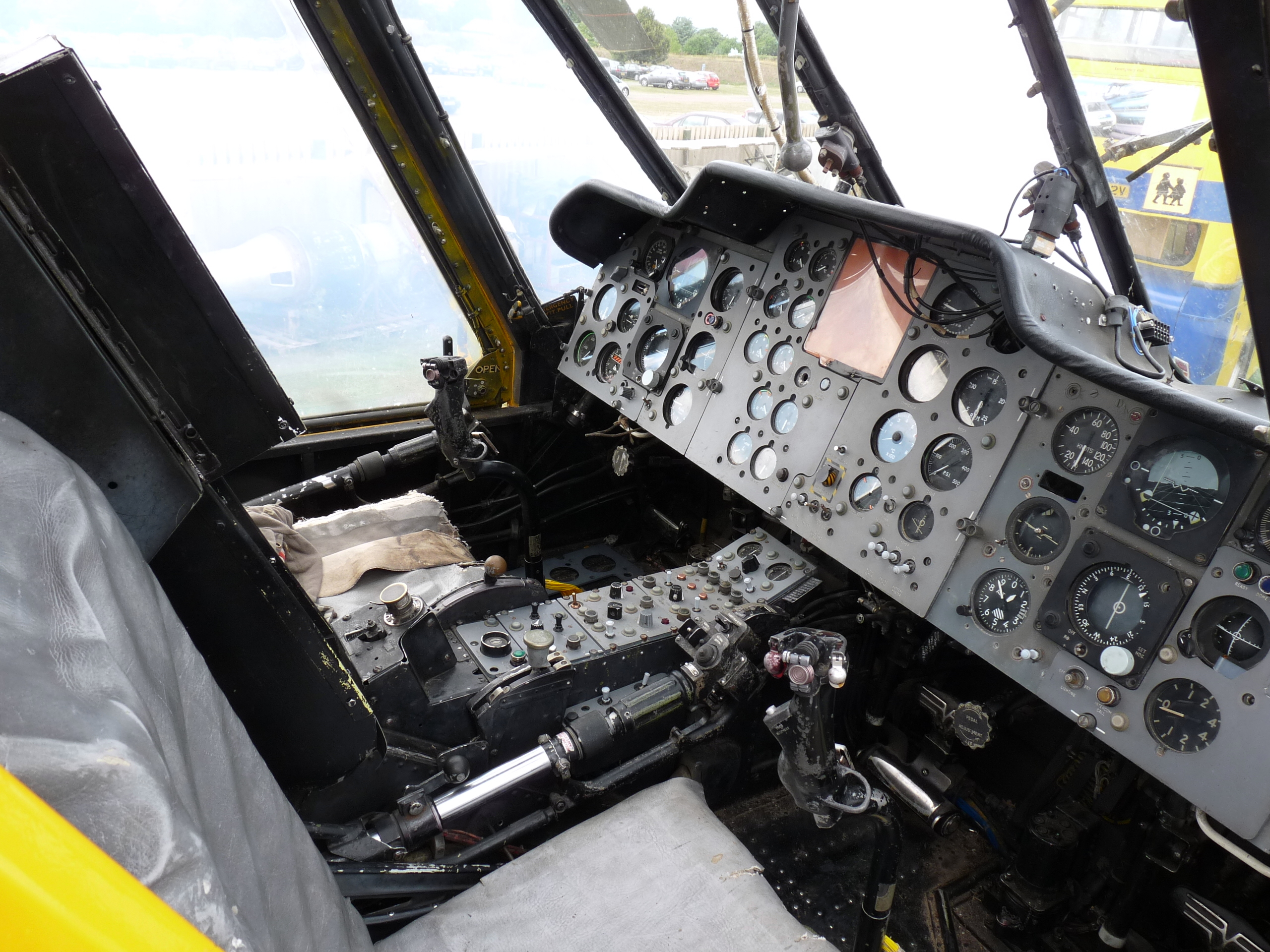
Cockpit

In the early 1950s, Sikorsky developed the S-58, an improved version of the S-55, which had entered service as the H-19 with the United States. The United States Navy issued a contract in 1952 for the S-58, entering service as the HUS-1, the Army placing a contract in 1955 as the H-34, and the Marine Corps in 1957 (as the HUS-1). During 1962, these names were standardized to using the H-34, with additional prefixes and letters according to that U.S. designation system. Westland had already made a version of the predecessor, the S-55, as the Westland Whirlwind.

In 1956, an American-built S-58 was shipped to Britain for Westland to use as a pattern aircraft. Initially assembled with its Wright Cyclone, it was demonstrated to the British armed services leading to a preliminary order for the Royal Navy. For British production, it was re-engined with a single Napier Gazelle turboshaft engine, first flying in that configuration on 17 May 1957. The lighter (by 600 lb or 270 kg) Gazelle engine required some redistribution of weight. The first Westland-built Wessex serial XL727, designated a Wessex HAS.1, first flew on 20 June 1958. The first production Wessex HAS1 were delivered to Royal Navy's Fleet Air Arm (FAA) in early 1960; the Wessex was the first helicopter operated by the FAA to be purpose-designed from scratch as an anti-submarine platform.

In service, the Wessex was found to be a major improvement over the older Westland Whirlwind. The decision made by Westland to install a modern gas-turbine powerplant gave the Wessex a greater load capacity, was quieter and generated less vibration, the latter quality being highly beneficial when treating casualties during flight. The Gazelle engine allowed for rapid starting and thus faster response times. The Wessex could also operate in a wide range of weather conditions as well as at night, partly due to its use of an automatic pilot. These same qualities that made the Wessex well-suited to the anti-submarine role also lent themselves to the search and rescue (SAR) mission, which the type would become heavily used for.

=== Further development ===
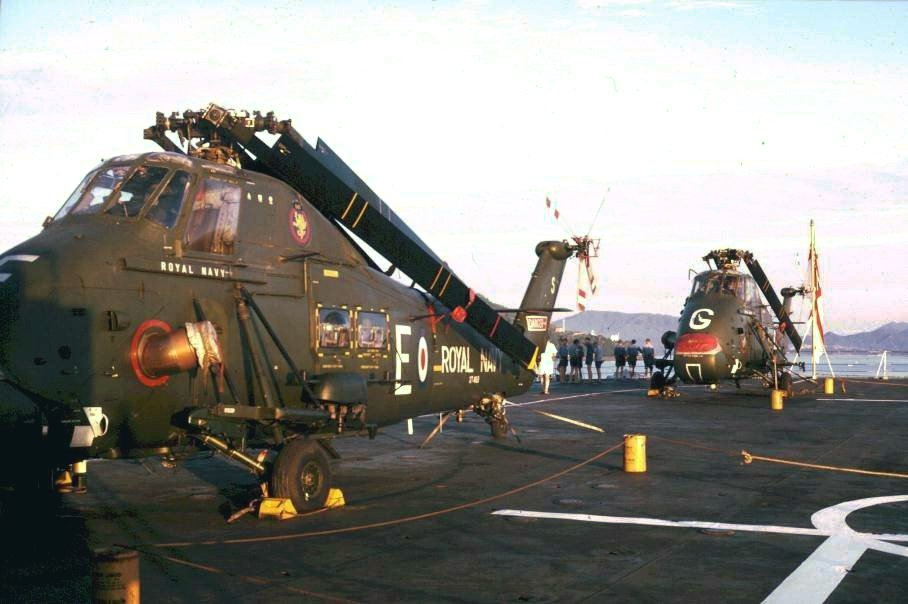
A pair of Royal Navy Wessex helicopters on the flight deck of HMS Intrepid, 1968

An improved variant, the Wessex HAS.3, succeeded the HAS.1 in the anti-submarine role; it had a more capable radar and better avionics, greater engine power, improved navigational features and a more advanced weapon system; the original HAS.1 were re-tasked for SAR duties. A commando assault variant, the Wessex HU.5, was also developed as a battlefield transportation helicopter; it was deployed on the navy's amphibious assault ships, such as the commando carrier HMS Albion, and used to transport Royal Marines. The Wessex HU.5 was powered by coupled de Havilland Gnome engines, which provided nearly double the power of the original HAS.1 model and significantly extended its range. This enabled it to operate in a wider range of conditions; during the 1970s, the HU.5 also started to be used for the SAR mission.

As an anti-submarine helicopter, the Wessex could be either equipped with a dipping sonar to detect and track submarines or be armed with either depth charges or torpedoes; a single Wessex could not search for and attack submarines as this was beyond its carrying capability. It was this limitation that soon led the Royal Navy to search for a more capable helicopter that could provide this capability. This ultimately resulted in Westland proceeding with the adaptation and production of another Sikorsky-designed helicopter in the form of the Westland Sea King.

The Wessex was also used as a general-purpose helicopter for the RAF, for troop-carrying, air ambulance and ground support roles. The Wessex was the first of the RAF's helicopters in which instrument flying, and thus night operations, were possible. Unlike the Navy's Wessex fleet, which was largely composed of early single-engine models, the RAF mandated that its Wessex helicopters should be all twin-engined; this was a major factor in the RAF's decision to reject the adoption of ex-FAA Wessex helicopters as the Navy migrated to the newer Sea King.

== Operational history ==
=== United Kingdom ===
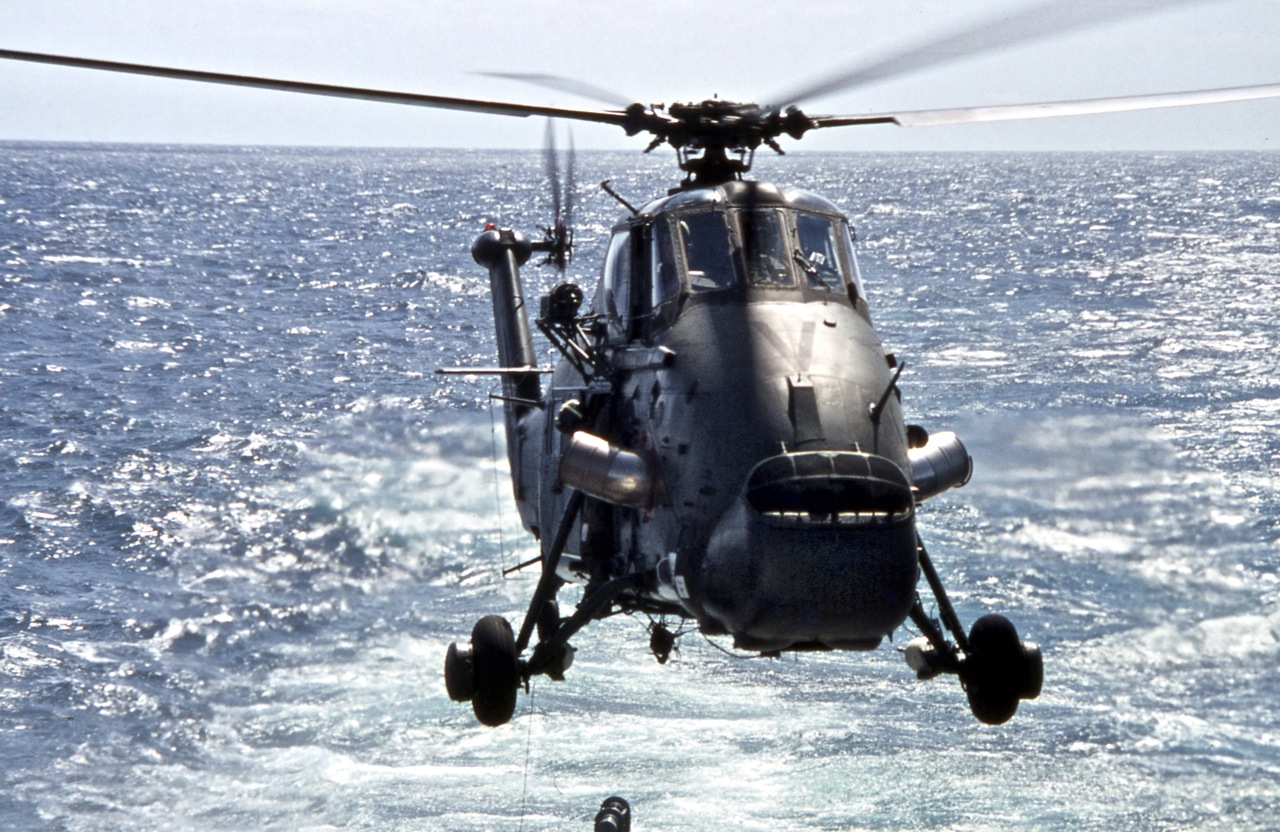
Wessex of the Royal Navy, 1980

==== Overview ====
The Wessex was first used by the Royal Navy, which introduced the Wessex HAS.1 to operational service in 1961. Having been satisfied by the favourable initial performance of the Wessex but seeking to improve its avionics and equipment, the Navy soon pressed for the development of the improved HAS.3, which came into service in 1967. Operationally, younger models would be assigned to perform the key anti-submarine warfare and commando transport missions, while older and less capable models would be typically be assigned to land bases for search and rescue (SAR).

The RAF became an operator of the Wessex in 1962; those helicopters used for air-sea or mountain rescue duties helped make the Wessex a particularly well known aircraft of the service and contributed to the saving of many lives during its time in service. As one of the RAF's standing duties, multiple Wessex helicopters were permanently kept on standby to respond to an emergency located anywhere within 40 miles of the British coastline within 15 minutes during daytime. At night, this response time was increased to 60 minutes. SAR-tasked Wessex helicopters were also stationed abroad, such as at Cyprus. The qualities of the Wessex were described as being "ideal for mountain flying".

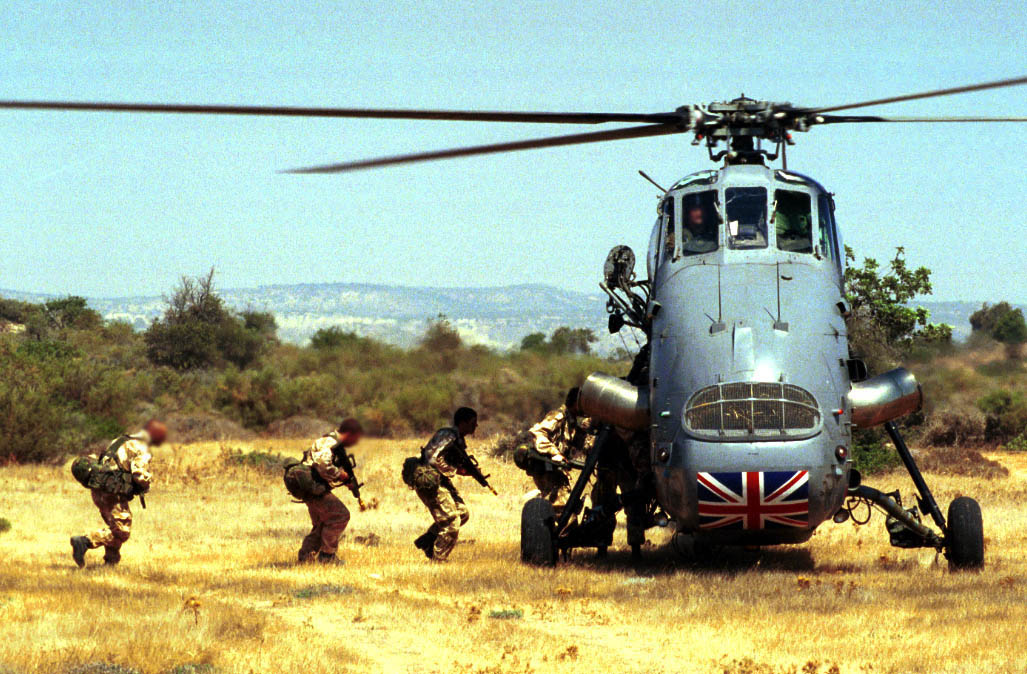
Troops embarking on a Westland Wessex during a training exercise on Cyprus, 1999

The Wessex often found itself being used on the battlefield as a utility transport; as well as delivering supplies and equipment, the Wessex could also transport small groups of troops. Operationally, the Wessex could lift less than the RAF's Bristol Belvedere helicopters, but was more robust and required less maintenance; thus, when the Belvedere was retired at the end of the 1960s, Wessex squadrons were often tasked with their former duties in support of the British Army on an ad hoc basis. In large-scale helicopter assault operations, the type could be escorted by the RAF's Hawker Siddeley Harriers. The HC.4 variant of the Westland Sea King began to replace the Wessex in this capacity from the late 1970s onwards, although troop-carrying missions would continue into the late 1990s.

The Wessex's service career featured long-term deployments to both Hong Kong and Northern Ireland to support internal security operations, performing transport and surveillance missions. In Northern Ireland, the use of helicopters for supply missions proved a viable alternative to vulnerable road convoys; operations in this theatre led to the employment of various defensive equipment and countermeasures against the threat posed by small arms and shoulder-launched anti-air missiles.

=== Queen's Flight ===
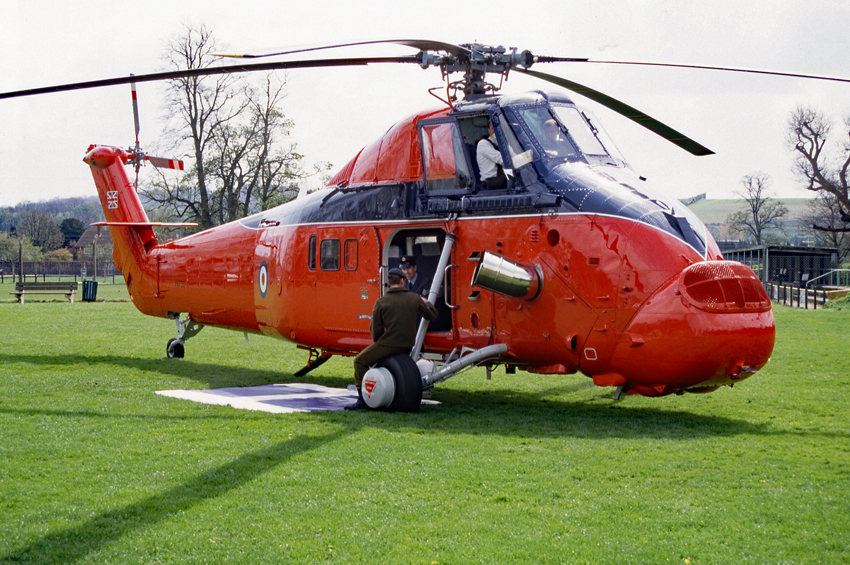
Wessex HCC4 XV733 on royal duties at Alton in 1992

Wessex helicopters were also used by the Queen's Flight of the RAF to transport VIPs including members of the British royal family; in this role, the helicopters were designated HCC.4 and were essentially similar to the HC.2, differences included an upgraded interior, additional navigation equipment and enhanced maintenance programmes. Both Prince Philip and then-Prince Charles were trained Wessex pilots; occasionally they would perform as flying crew members in addition to being passengers on board the VIP services. The Wessex was replaced in this role by a privately leased Sikorsky S-76 in 1998.

==== Wartime operations ====
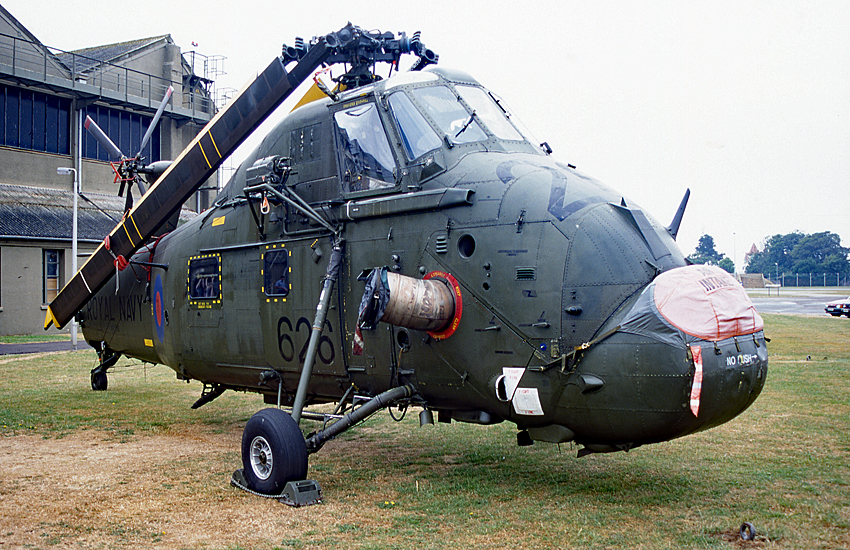
XS510 Westland WS58 Wessex HU5 626 of 772 Squadron, in 1995

In 1962, an international crisis arose as Indonesia threatened confrontation over the issue of Brunei, which was not in the newly formed Federation of Malaya. By February 1964, a large number of RAF and RN helicopters, including Westland Wessex, were operating from bases in Sarawak and Sabah to assist Army and Marine detachments fighting guerilla forces infiltrated by Indonesia over its 1,000-mile frontier with Malaysia. Much of the anti-submarine equipment having been removed to lighten the aircraft, during the campaign in Borneo the Wessex was typically operated as a transport helicopter, capable of ferrying up to 16 troops or a 4,000-pound payload of supplies directly to the front lines. Alongside the Westland Scout, the Wessex emerged as one of the main workhorses of the campaign; roughly half were operated directly from land bases and would regularly rotate with those stationed on RN vessels stationed off shore. From these operations the Commando Helicopter Force gets its nickname of the Junglies.

Around 55 Westland Wessex HU.5s participated in the Falklands War, fighting in the South Atlantic in 1982. On 21 May 1982, 845 Squadron's Wessex HU.5s supported British landings on East Falkland. The type was heavily used throughout the conflict for the transportation and insertion of British special forces, including members of the Special Air Service and the Special Boat Service (SBS). A total of nine Wessex (eight HU.5s and one HAS.3) were lost during the Falklands campaign. Two HU.5s of 845 Squadron crashed on the Fortuna Glacier in South Georgia during an attempt to extract members of the Special Air Service during a snow storm; six of 848 Squadron's Wessex HU.5s were lost when the container ship Atlantic Conveyor was sunk; and the HAS.3 aboard HMS Glamorgan was destroyed when the ship was struck by an Exocet missile.

=== Retirement ===
The last in UK service were retired in 2003. These were HC2 models used by the RAF.

==== Civilian operations ====
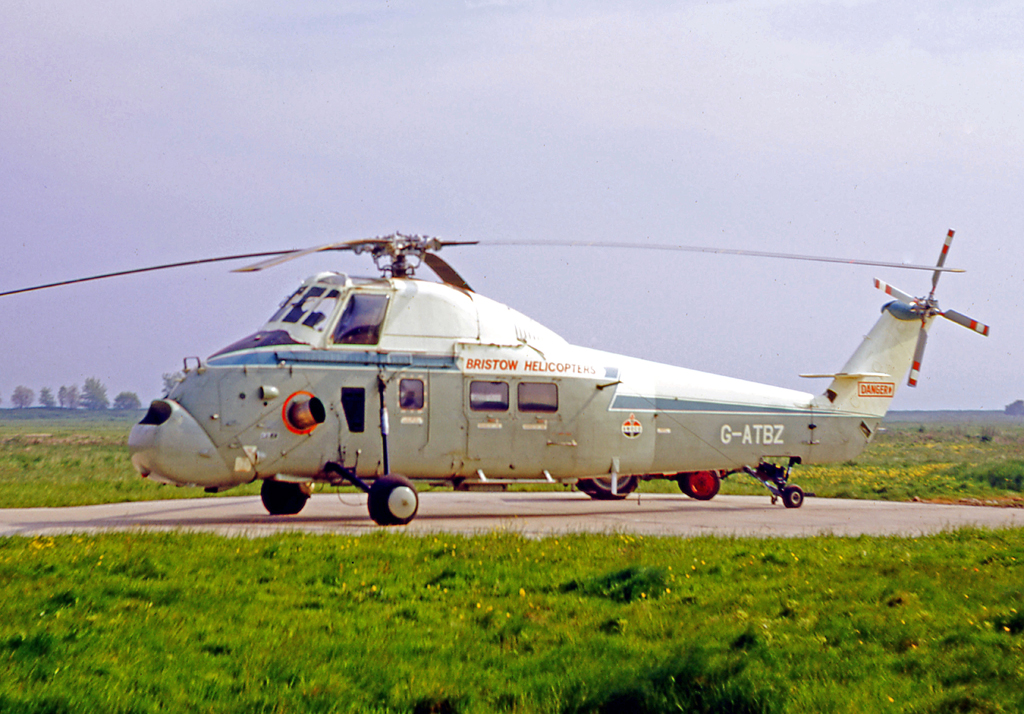
Wessex 60 of Bristow Helicopters at North Denes airfield, Norfolk, in 1970 during support flights to the growing North Sea oil industry

A civilian version of the helicopter, the Wessex 60, was also manufactured and supplied to a number of civilian operators, including Bristow Helicopters, one of the biggest rotary-wing operators in the world. Bristow flew them from various UK airfields and helicopter pads to support the growing North Sea oil industry until they were withdrawn in 1982.

=== Australia ===
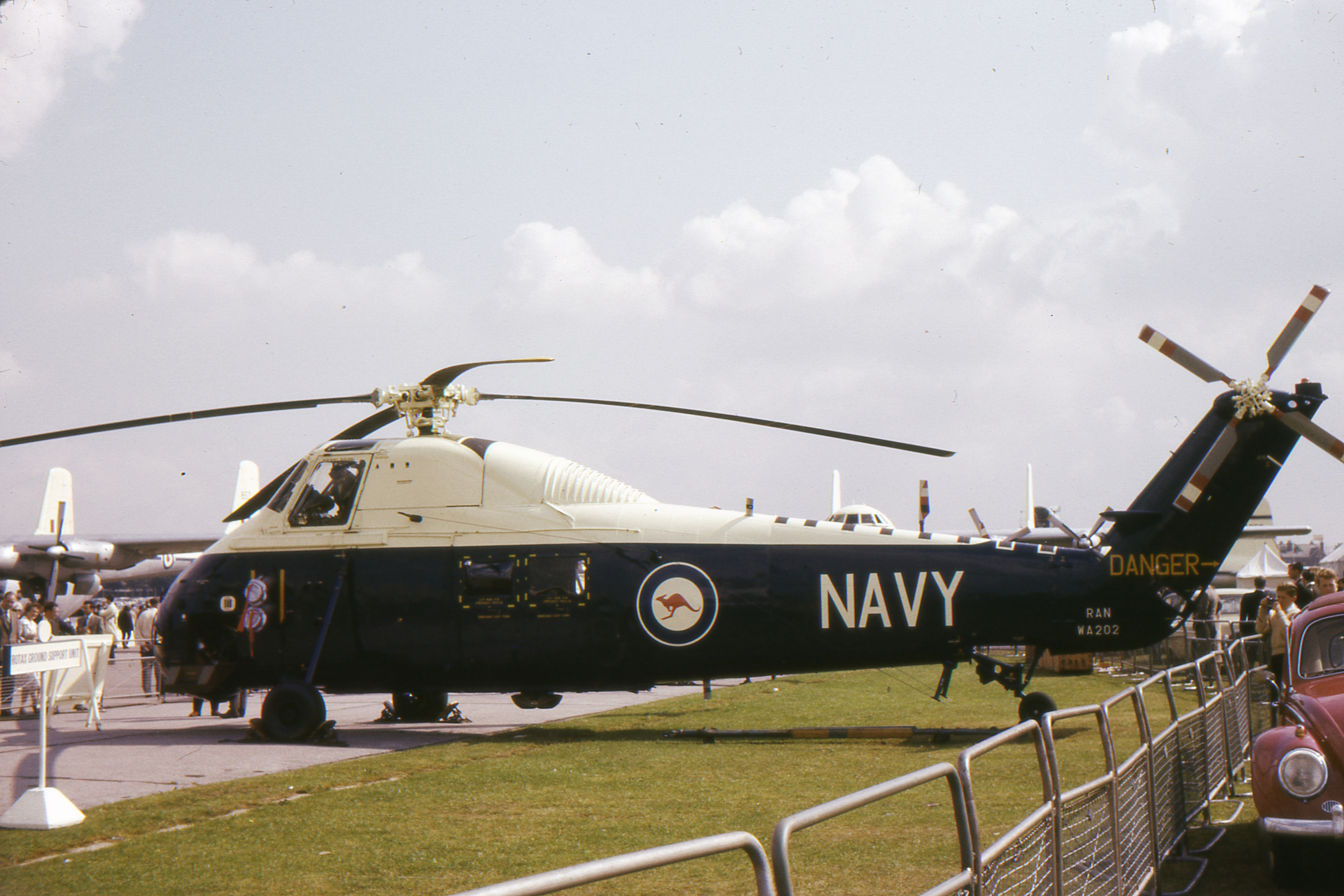
An Australian Wessex in 1962

In April 1961, the Royal Australian Navy (RAN) announced that they had selected the Westland Wessex to become the standard service helicopter from their ships and its intention to purchase roughly 30 for anti-submarine patrols, casualty evacuations, and fleet communications duties. The RAN formally accepted the first two of 27 Wessex helicopters in September 1963; 817 Squadron was the first to operate the type; the Wessex and its dunking sonar array quickly proved to be the most effective anti-submarine platform as yet seen in the RAN.

The Wessex was a major operational shift for the Fleet Air Arm, enabling the RAN to proceed with the conversion of the aircraft carrier HMAS Melbourne as an anti-submarine platform. In typical carrier operations, a Wessex would be deployed during the launch and recovery of fixed-wing aircraft as a guard helicopter; during anti-submarine patrols, routine procedure was to have one Wessex airborne to actively screen the ship while a second would be fully armed and prepared for operations, such an arrangement was used during troop transport deployments by HMAS Sydney to Vietnam during the 1960s. Performing search and rescue sorties became another valued role of the type; in 1974, multiple Wessex helicopters participated in the relief effort in Darwin in the aftermath of Cyclone Tracy.

While the Wessex proved to be too large to reasonably operate from most of the RAN's destroyers, it was found to be well suited as a troop-transport helicopter from heavy landing ships and larger vessels. By 1980, the Wessex was no longer being used for anti-submarine operations, having been replaced by the more advanced and capable Westland Sea King in this capacity. Instead, remaining Wessex helicopters were retained to perform its secondary roles as a plane guard, search and rescue platform, and as a utility transport helicopter. The type was withdrawn from service in 1989.

=== Warbird flight ===
In 2019, one retired Wessex HU.5 was restored to flying condition, after having last flown 30 years ago. After a 10,000 hour expert restoration, HU5 XT761/ G‑WSEX took flight again in Somerset, England.

== Variants ==
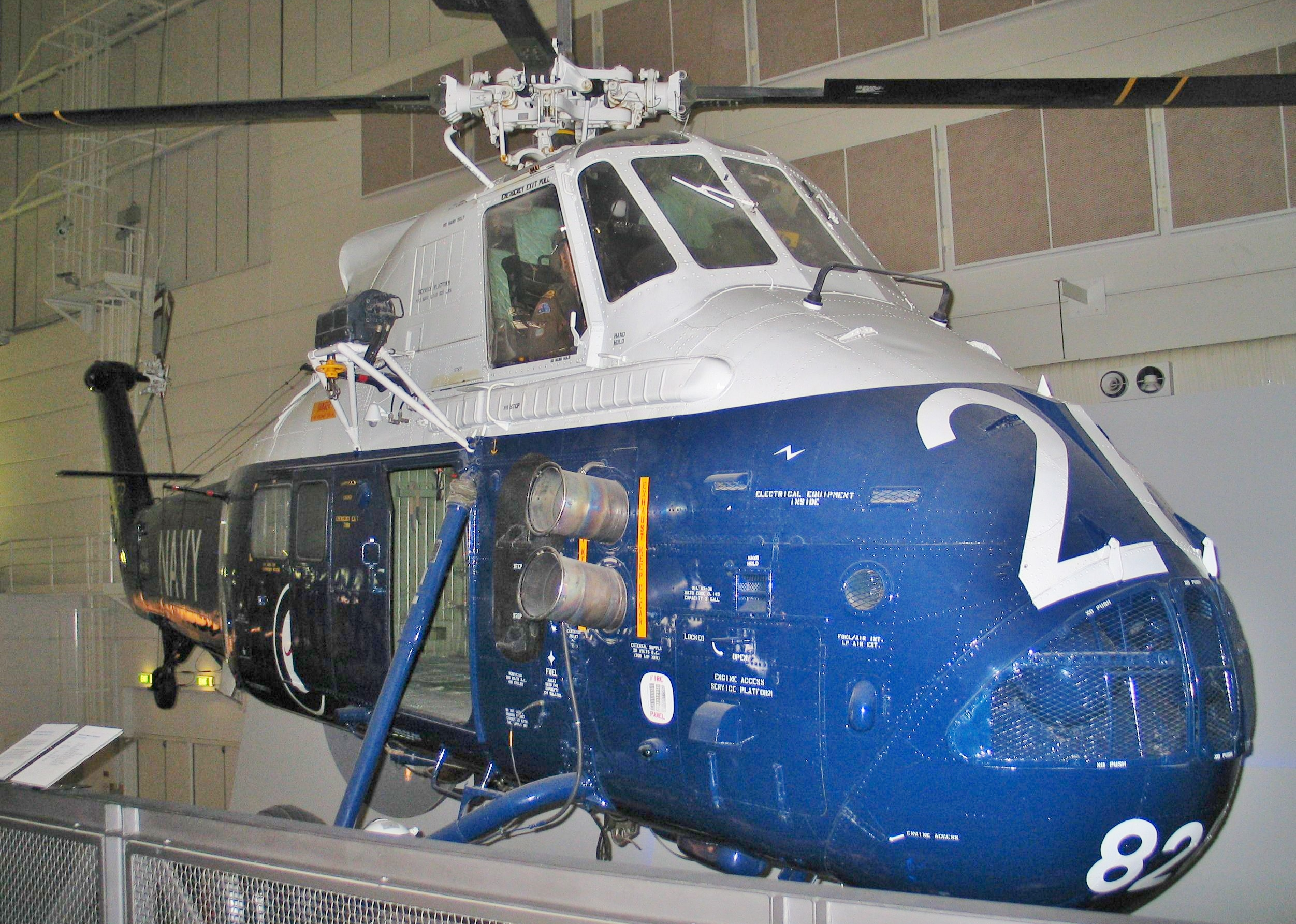
A Wessex at the Australian National Maritime Museum

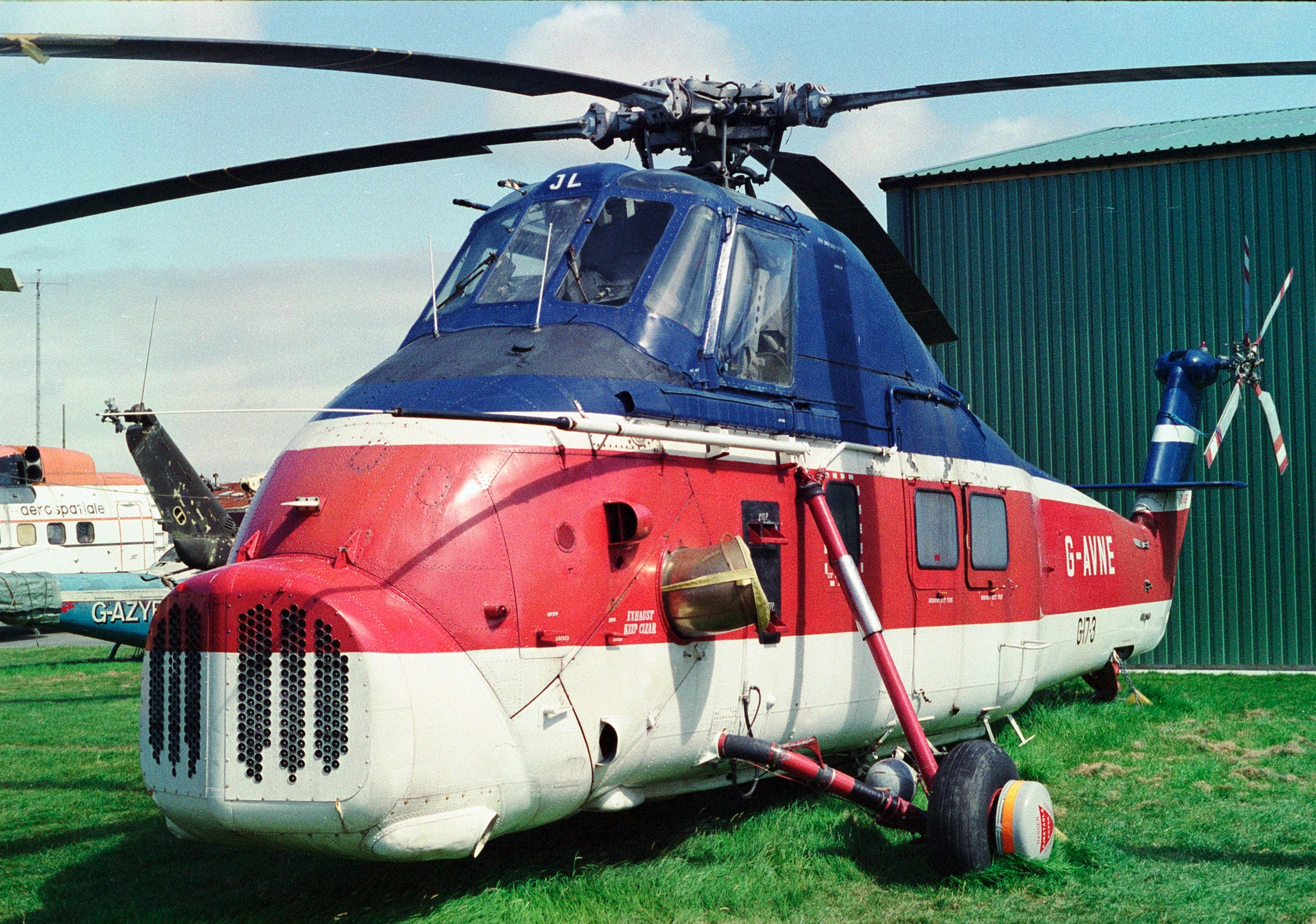
Wessex 60

Wessex HAS.1
RN utility, anti-submarine warfare, later air-sea rescue only, 140 built, some later converted to HAS.3.
Wessex HC.2
RAF Troop carrier for up to 16 troops, One prototype converted from HAS1 and 73 built.
Wessex HAR.2
RAF search and rescue conversions.
Wessex HAS.3
RN anti-submarine version with improved avionics with a radome on the rear fuselage, 3 new-build development aircraft and 43 converted from HAS.1
Wessex HCC.4
VIP transport for the Queen's Flight, two built
Wessex HU.5
RN service troop transporter, carried 16 Royal Marines, 101 built
Wessex 31A
Royal Australian Navy anti-submarine warfare model, 27 built. Upgraded to 31B after delivery.
Wessex 31B
Updated anti-submarine warfare model for the Royal Australian Navy.
Wessex 52
Military transport version of the HC.2 for the Iraqi Air Force, 12 built.
Wessex 53
Military transport version of the HC.2 for the Ghana Air Force, two built.
Wessex 54
Military transport version of the HC.2 for the Brunei Air Wing, two built
Wessex 60
Civilian version of the Wessex HC.2, 20 built.

== Notable accidents ==
- G-ASWI – Bristow Helicopters. Crashed into North Sea during August 1981; there were no survivors.
- Two Westland Wessex HU.5 helicopters from 845 Naval Air Squadron crashed on the Fortuna Glacier on 22 April 1982, during the Falklands War
- XR524 (RAF) – Crashed August 1993 in North Wales after tail rotor failure, killing three of the seven occupants.

== Operators ==
=== Military operators ===
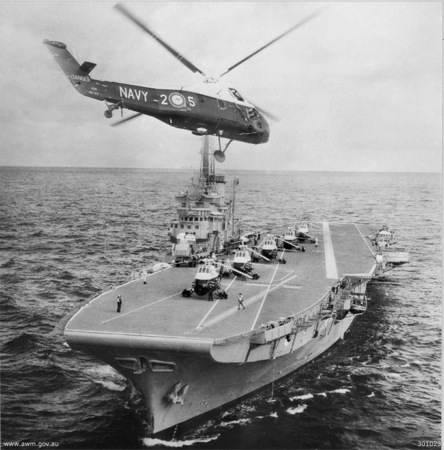
An Australian Wessex helicopter in flight, behind is HMAS Melbourne. Five additional Wessex line the flight deck.

External videos
- Westland Wessex from RAF Aldergrove on exercise with Mourne mountain rescue team
- Wessex performing various maneuvers during public display

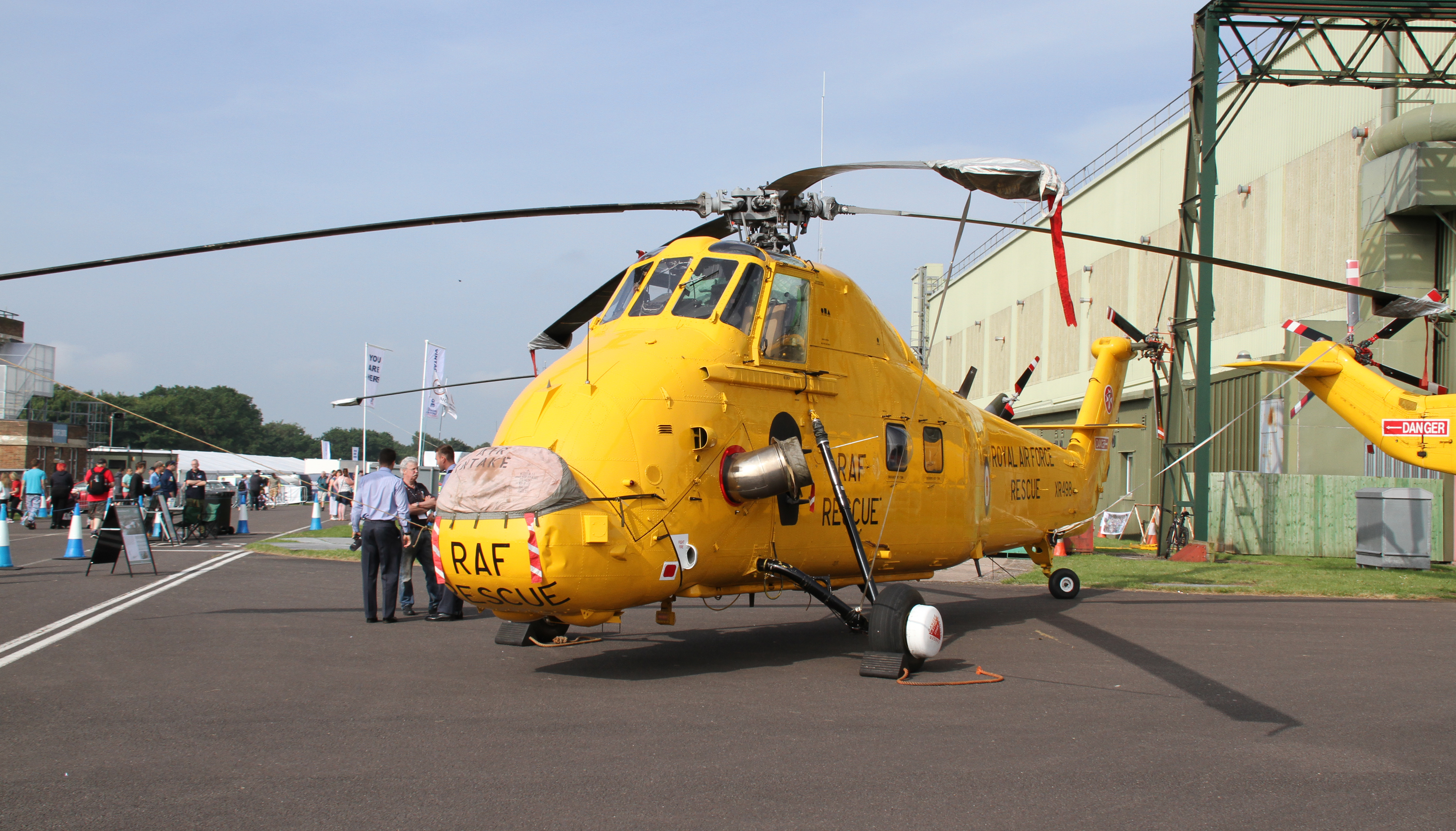
Westland Wessex HC.2 on display in 2018

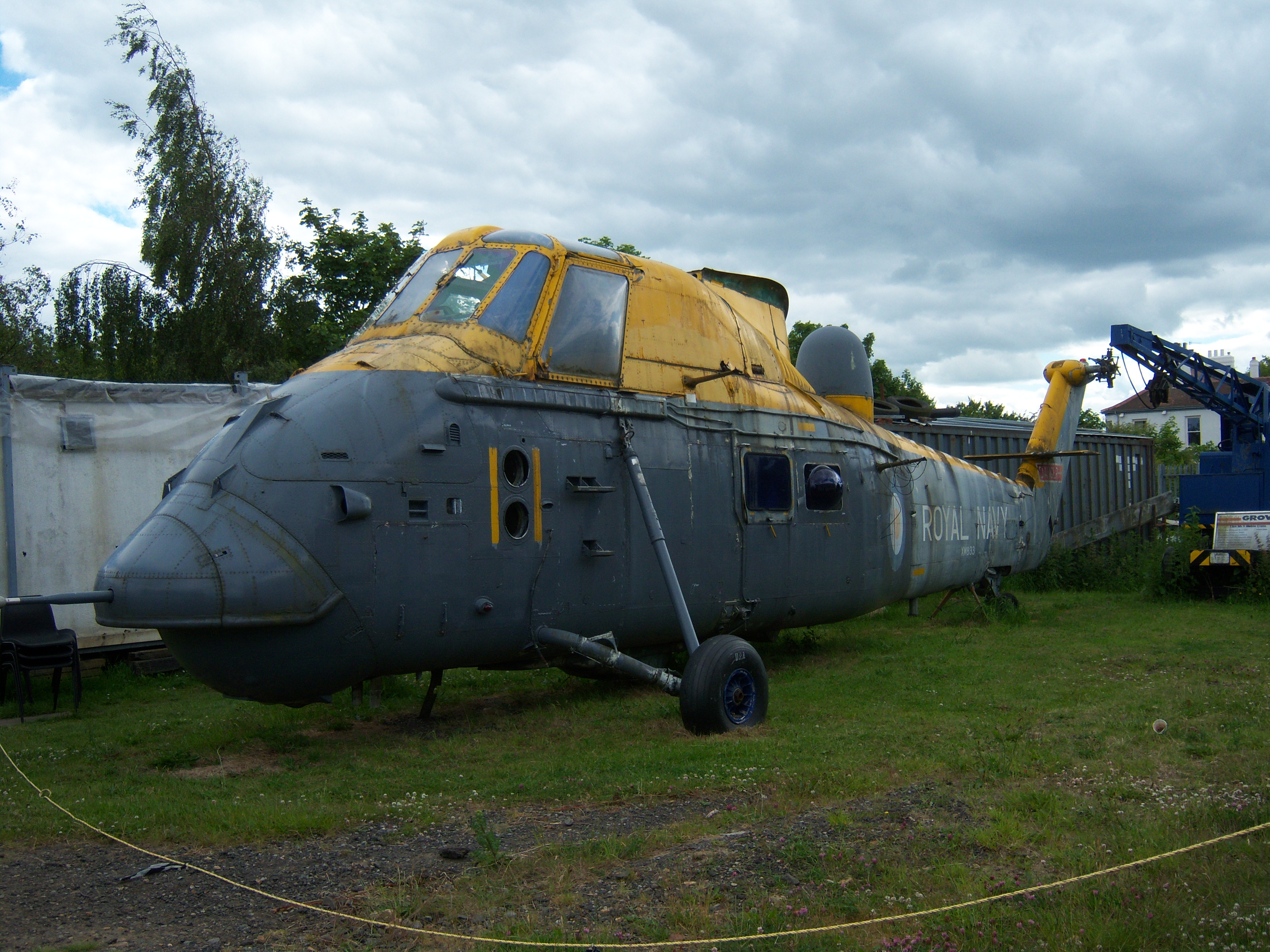
Wessex HAS.3

Australia

- Royal Australian Navy
  - 723 Squadron RAN (HC-723)
  - 725 Squadron RAN
  - 816 Squadron RAN (HU-816)
  - 817 Squadron RAN (HS-817)

Brunei

- Brunei Air Wing

Ghana

- Ghana Air Force

Iraq

- Iraqi Air Force
  - 2nd Squadron (Iraq)

Oman

- Sultan of Oman's Air Force

United Kingdom

- Empire Test Pilots' School
- Royal Air Force
  - No. 18 Squadron RAF
  - No. 22 Squadron RAF
  - No. 28 Squadron RAF
  - No. 32 Squadron RAF
  - No. 60 Squadron RAF
  - No. 72 Squadron RAF
  - No. 78 Squadron RAF
  - No. 84 Squadron RAF
  - No. 103 Squadron RAF
  - The Queen's Flight
  - No. 2 Flying Training School RAF
  - No. 202 Squadron RAF
  - No. 240 Operational Conversion Unit RAF
  - Search and Rescue Training Unit
- Royal Navy
  - Front Line Squadrons
    - 814 Naval Air Squadron
    - 815 Naval Air Squadron
    - 819 Naval Air Squadron
    - 820 Naval Air Squadron
    - 826 Naval Air Squadron
    - 829 Naval Air Squadron
    - 845 Naval Air Squadron
    - 846 Naval Air Squadron
    - 847 Naval Air Squadron
    - 848 Naval Air Squadron
  - Second Line Squadrons
    - 700H Naval Air Squadron
    - 700V Naval Air Squadron
    - 706 Naval Air Squadron
    - 706B Naval Air Squadron
    - 707 Naval Air Squadron
    - 737 Naval Air Squadron
    - 771 Naval Air Squadron
    - 772 Naval Air Squadron
    - 781 Naval Air Squadron

Uruguay

- Uruguayan Air Force
- Uruguayan Navy

=== Civil operators ===
United Kingdom

- Bristow Helicopters

== Aircraft on display ==
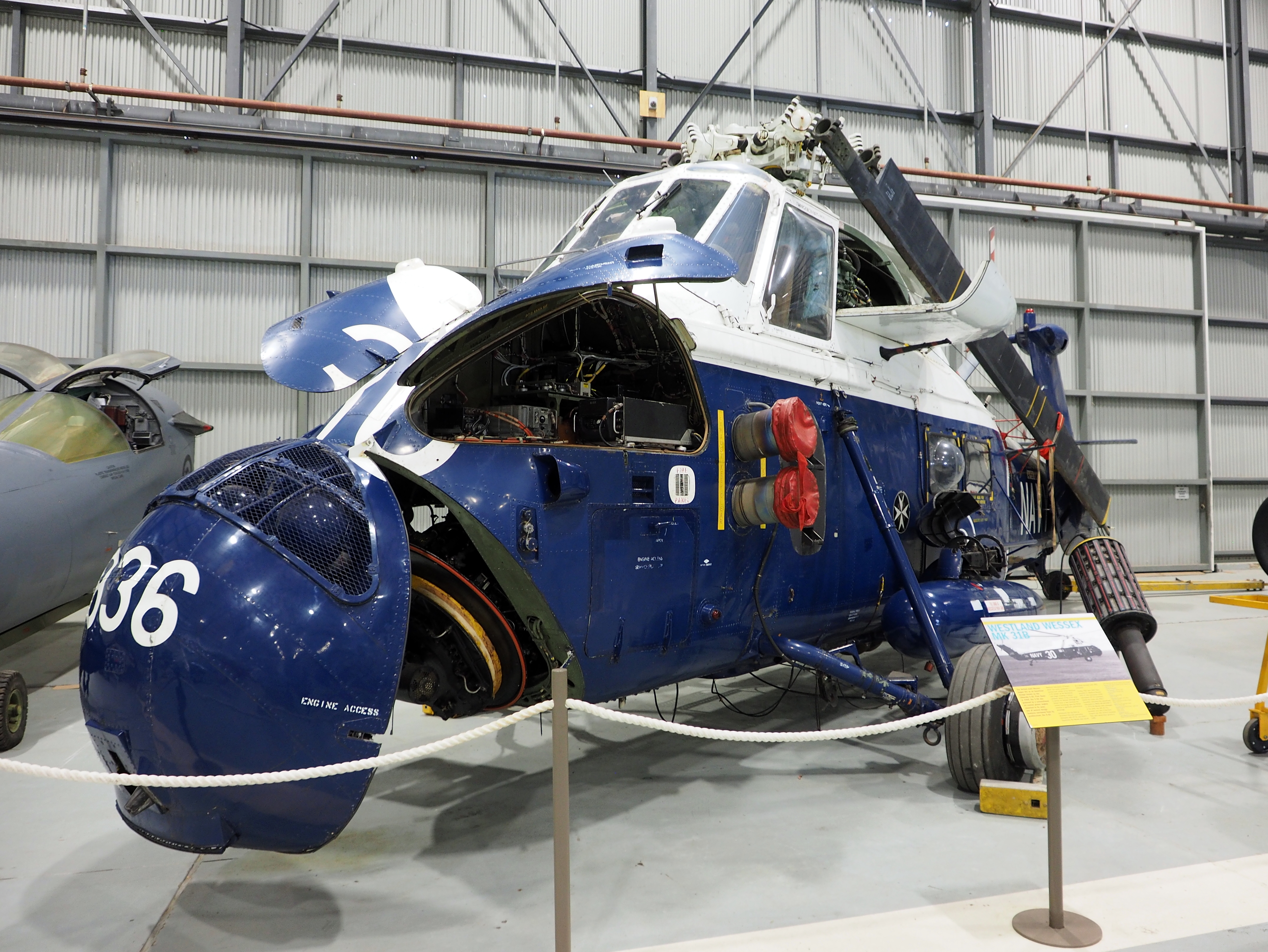
Ex-Royal Australian Navy Wessex Mk31B at the Fleet Air Arm Museum

Australia

- N7-202 – HAS.31 on display at the Darwin Aviation Museum in Darwin, Northern Territory.
- N7-203 – HAS.31B on display at the Historical Aircraft Restoration Society in Parkes, New South Wales.
- N7-204 – HAS.31B on display at the Australian National Aviation Museum in Melbourne.
- N7-214 – HAS.31B on display at the Australian Aviation Heritage Centre (Qld) in Caboolture, Queensland.
- N7-216 – On display at the Australian National Maritime Museum in Sydney.
- N7-217 – HAS.31A on display at the Queensland Air Museum in Caloundra Airport, Queensland.
- N7-221 – On display at the National Vietnam Veterans Museum in Newhaven, Victoria.
- N7-222 – HAS.31B on display at the Historical Aircraft Restoration Society in Albion Park Rail, New South Wales.
- N7-224 – HAS.31B on display at the South Australian Aviation Museum in Port Adelaide, South Australia.
- N7-226 – HAS.31 on display at the Fleet Air Arm Museum in Nowra, New South Wales.

Germany

- XR527 – HC.2 on display at Flugausstellung Hermeskeil in Hermeskeil, Rhineland-Palatinate.
- XT670 – HC.2 on display at Flugausstellung Hermeskeil in Hermeskeil, Rhineland-Palatinate.

United Kingdom

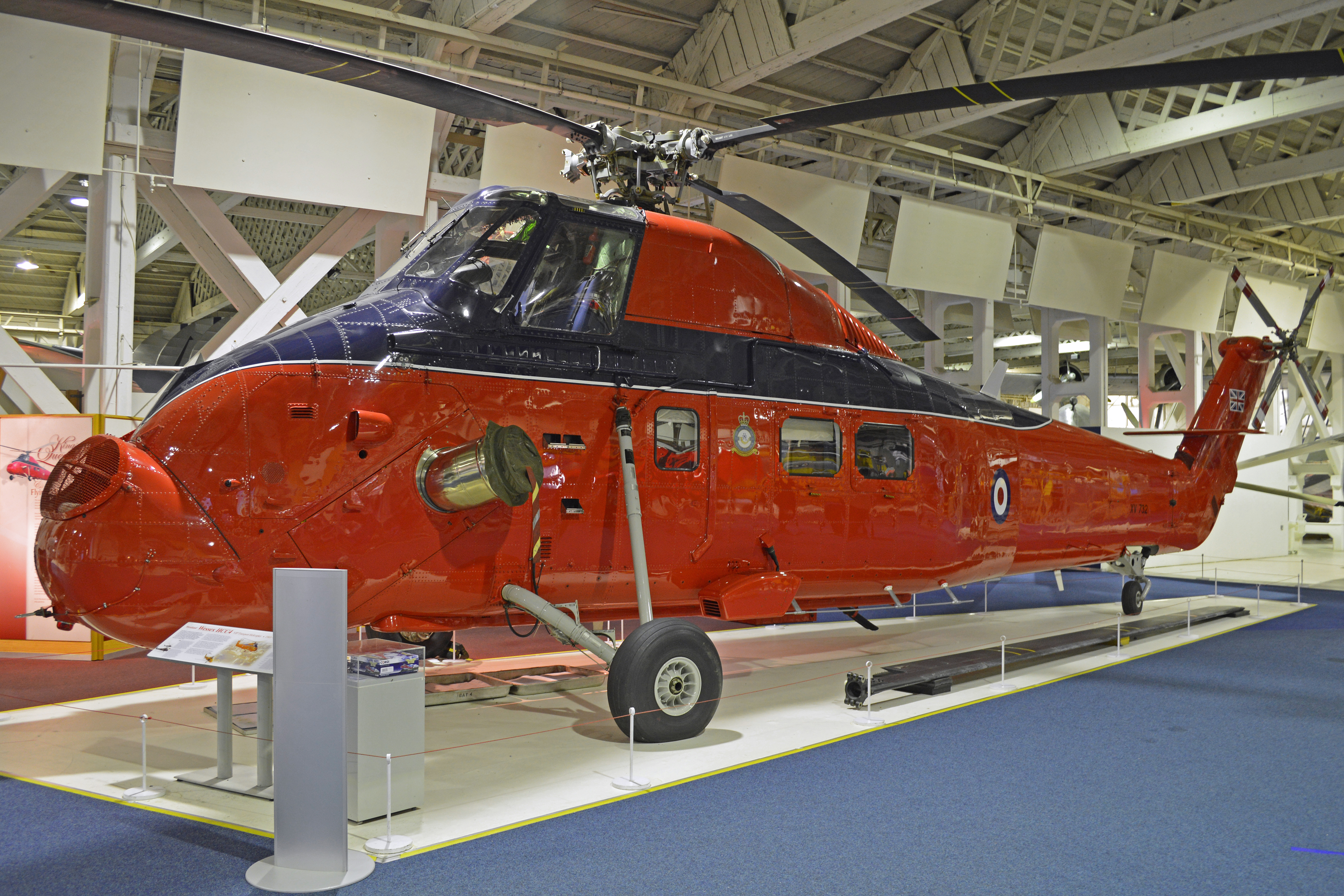
Westland Wessex HCC4 XV732 in Queen's Flight livery at the Royal Air Force Museum London

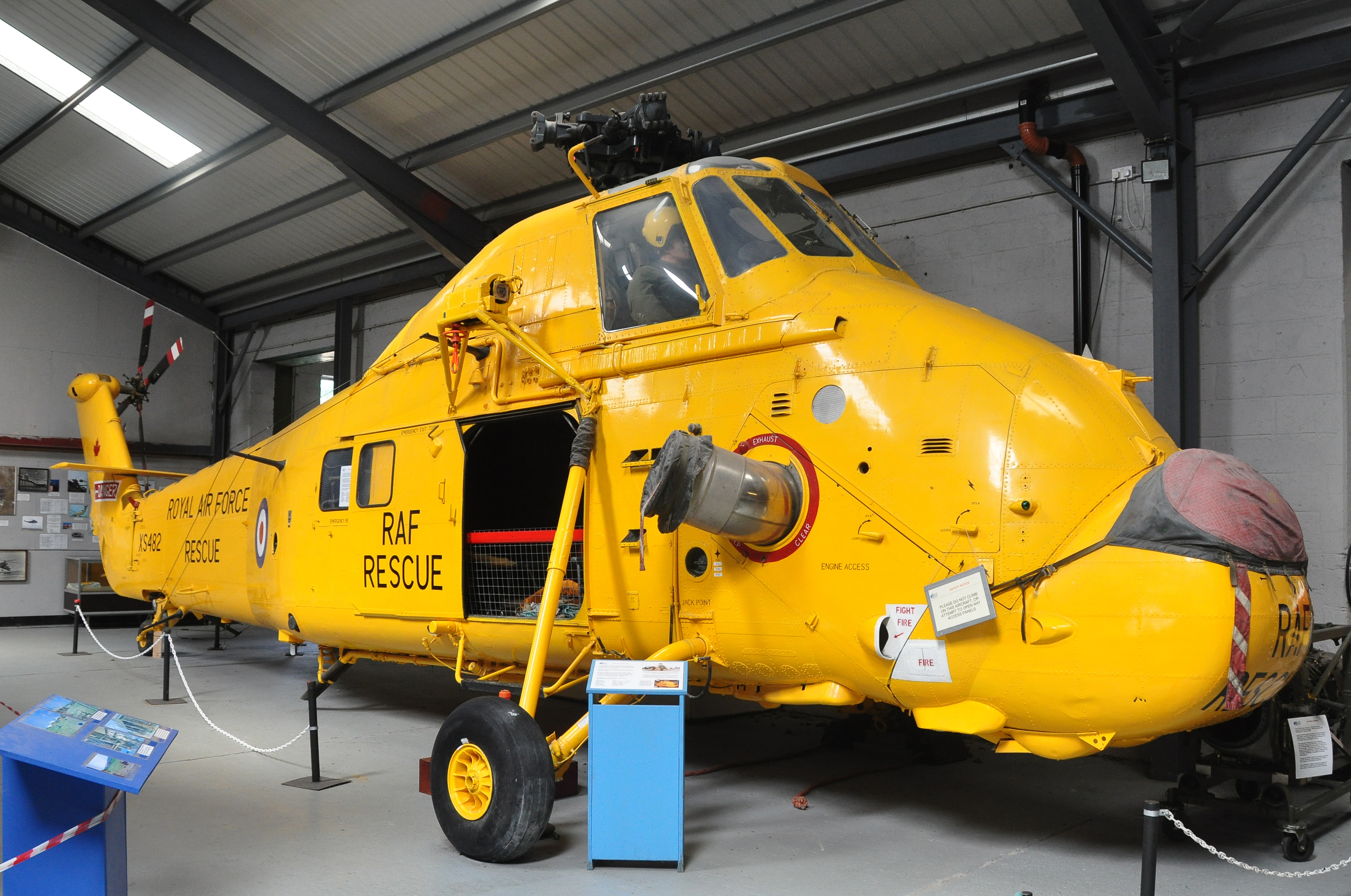
Westland Wessex HU5 XS482 at the RAF Manston History Museum in Kent, U.K.

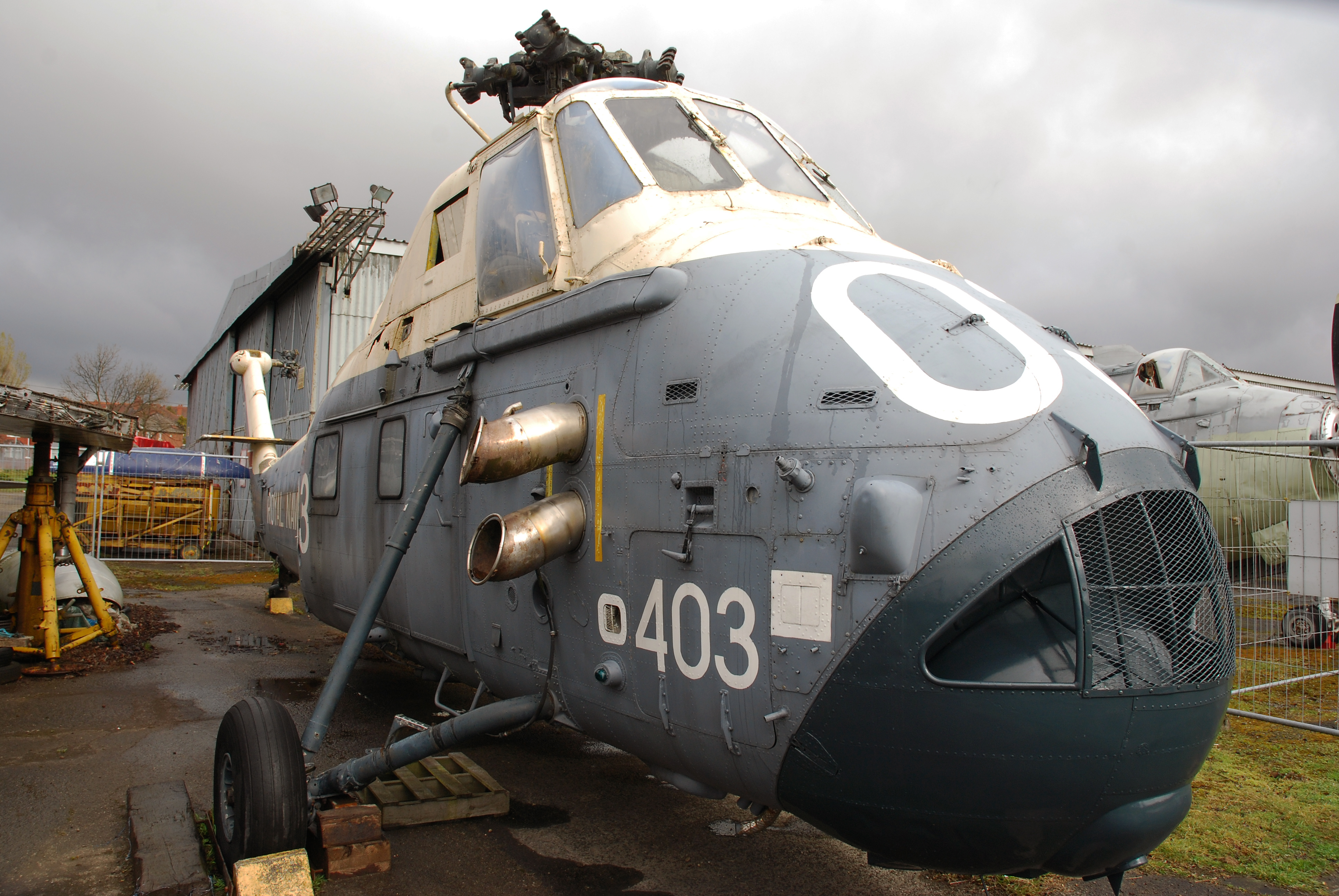
Retired Wessex in 2008

- XM328 – HAS.3 on display at The Helicopter Museum in Weston-super-Mare, Somerset.
- XM330 – HAS.1 on display at The Helicopter Museum in Weston-super-Mare, Somerset.
- XP142 – HAS.3 in storage at the Fleet Air Arm Museum in Yeovil, Somerset.
- XR525 – HC.2 on display at the Royal Air Force Museum Cosford in Cosford, Shropshire.
- XR528 – HC.2 on static display at Morayvia in Kinloss, Moray.
- XR529 – HC.2 previously displayed as the RAF Aldergrove Gate Guardian, currently on display at Crumlin Road Gaol in Belfast, Northern Ireland.
- XS481 - HU.5 on display at the South Yorkshire Aircraft Museum, Doncaster.
- XS482 – HU.5 on display at the RAF Manston History Museum in Ramsgate, Kent.
- XS508 – HU.5 in storage at the Fleet Air Arm Museum in Yeovil, Somerset.
- XS511 – HU.5 on display at the Tangmere Military Aviation Museum in Tangmere, West Sussex.
- XS863 – HAS.1 on display at the Imperial War Museum Duxford in Duxford, Cambridgeshire.
- XT257 – HAS.3 on display at the Bournemouth Aviation Museum, Dorset.
- XT466 – HU.5 on static display at Morayvia in Kinloss, Moray.
- XT482 – HU.5 on display at the Fleet Air Arm Museum in Yeovil, Somerset.
- XT486 – HU.5 on display at the Dumfries and Galloway Aviation Museum in Dumfries, Dumfries and Galloway.
- XT604 – HC.2 on display at the East Midlands Aeropark in Castle Donington, Leicestershire.
- XT761 – HU.5 airworthy with Historic Helicopters in Chard, Somerset.
- XT765 – HU.5 in storage at the Fleet Air Arm Museum in Yeovil, Somerset.
- XT771 – HU.5 in storage with Historic Helicopters in Chard, Somerset.
- XV720 - HC.2 used as part of the Culham Laser Gaming course near Didcot, Oxfordshire.
- XV728 – HC.2 on display at the Newark Air Museum in Winthorpe, Nottinghamshire.
- XV732 – HCC.4 on display at the Royal Air Force Museum London in London.
- XV733 – HCC.4 on display at The Helicopter Museum in Weston-super-Mare, Somerset.
- WA0561 – Wessex 60 on display at The Helicopter Museum in Weston-super-Mare, Somerset.

Uruguay

- XR522 – HC.2 at the Museo Aeronáutico Coronel (Aviador) Jaime Meregalli in Ciudad de la Costa, Canelones.

== Specifications (Wessex HC.2) ==
Data from Westland Aircraft since 1915

General characteristics

- Crew: Two pilots (civilian type 60 Wessex cleared for single pilot operation)
- Capacity: 16 troops or 8 stretchers
- Length: 65 ft 10 in (20.07 m)
- Height: 15 ft 10 in (4.83 m)
- Empty weight: 8,340 lb (3,783 kg)
- Gross weight: 13,500 lb (6,123 kg)
- Powerplant: 2 × de Havilland Gnome H.1200 Mk.110/111 turboshaft, 1,350 shp (1,010 kW) each (limited to 1,550 shp (1,160 kW) total)
- Main rotor diameter: 56 ft 0 in (17.07 m)
- Main rotor area: 2,463 sq ft (228.8 m^{2})

Performance

- Maximum speed: 132 mph (212 km/h, 115 kn)
- Cruise speed: 122 mph (196 km/h, 106 kn)
- Range: 310 mi (500 km, 270 nmi) with standard fuel
- Service ceiling: 12,000 ft (3,700 m)
- Rate of climb: 1,650 ft/min (8.4 m/s)

== Notable appearances in film ==
Wessexes portrayed the visually similar CH-34 Choctaws in Stanley Kubrick's 1987 film Full Metal Jacket. The helicopters used were Wessex 60s, a civilian version of the Wessex HC.2. These are powered by the coupled-twin de Havilland Gnome with a distinctive long nose and single large turbine exhaust on each side, distinguishing them from the CH-34. XT761 was featured in season 4 of The Crown depicting Tom Byrne as the then Prince Andrew visiting the Queen.

== See also ==
Related development

- Sikorsky H-34
- Sikorsky H-19 Chickasaw
- Westland Whirlwind
- Land Rover 1/2 ton Lightweight (Vehicle developed for Wessex carriage (airlift))

Aircraft of comparable role, configuration, and era

- Mil Mi-4
- Harbin Z-5
