= 771 Naval Air Squadron =

Inactive flying squadron of the Royal Navy's Fleet Air Arm

- 771 Naval Air Sqdn crest
- Active: 1939–1955; 1961–1964; 1967–2016
- Disbanded: 22 March 2016
- Country: United Kingdom
- Branch: Royal Navy
- Type: Fleet Air Arm Second Line Squadron
- Role: Search and Rescue; Training
- Size: Squadron
- Part of: Fleet Air Arm: 51st Miscellaneous Air Group (July 1948 - 1950)
- Home station: RNAS Culdrose (HMS Seahawk)
- Mottos: Non Nobis Solum (Latin for 'Not unto us alone')
- Aircraft: See Aircraft operated section for full list.
- Decorations: Boyd Trophy 1992

771 Naval Air Squadron (771 NAS) of the Fleet Air Arm was a Fleet Air Arm (FAA) naval air squadron of the United Kingdom’s Royal Navy (RN). It was formed on 24 May 1939 at HMS Daedalus, Lee-on-Solent as a Fleet Requirements Unit with 14 Fairey Swordfish TSR biplanes. The squadron carried out various exercises with ships and provided towed targets for naval air gunners, and was decommissioned on 22 March 2016.

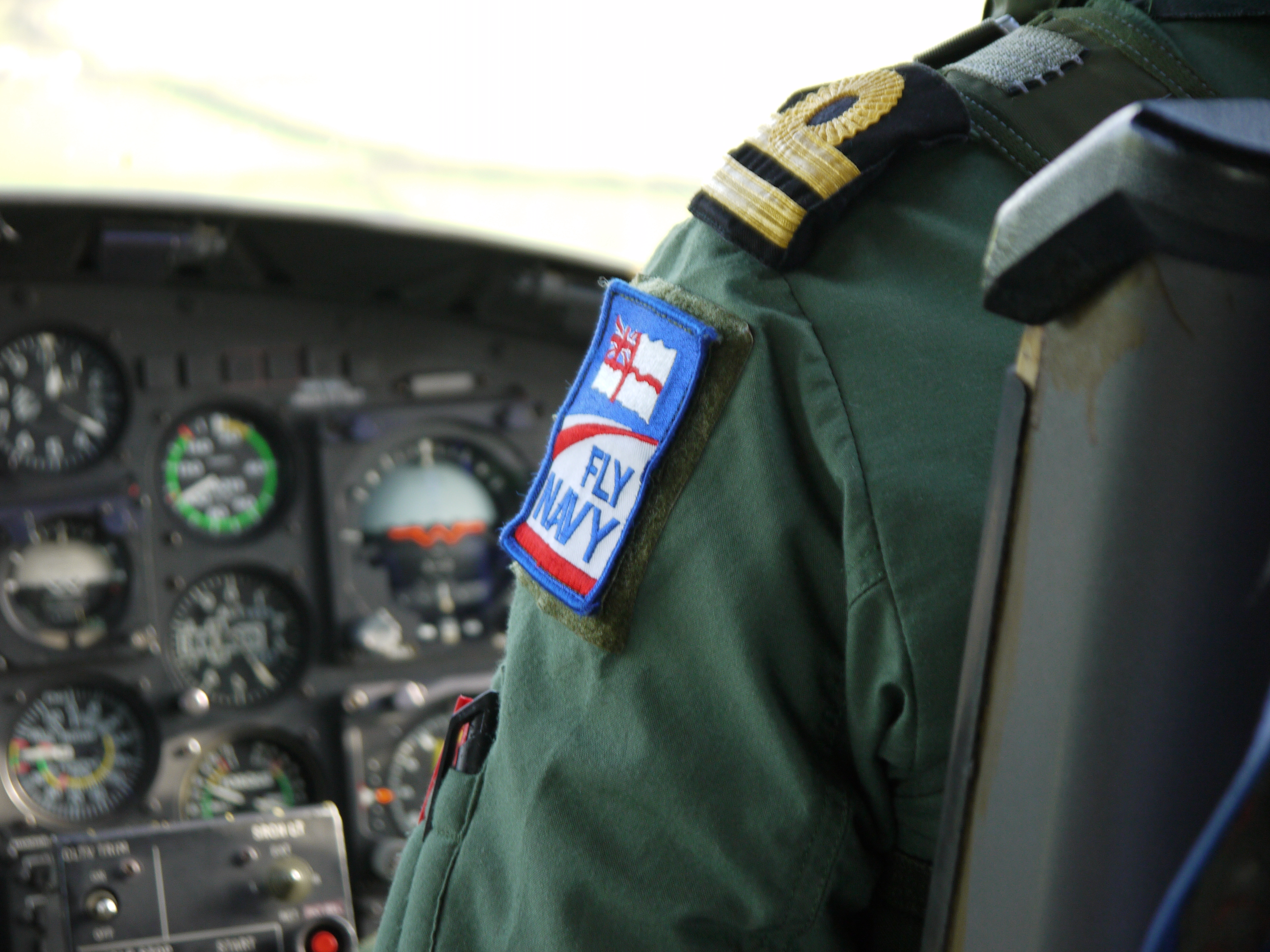

== History ==
=== Second World War ===
The Squadron initially had a northern element (X Flight), and a southern element (Y Flight). 'X' Flight broke away on 28 September 1939 to become 772 Naval Air Squadron. The reshaped 771 NAS was based at RNAS Hatston flying a variety of fixed-wing aircraft, ranging from Supermarine Walruses to Hawker Hurricanes, from airfields across the UK and abroad.

A notable point in 771's wartime history was that they started the chain that led to the sinking of the German battleship Bismarck. The Commanding Officer of HMS Sparrowhawk, Captain Henry Lockhart St John Fancourt, RN, had been ordered to identify and sink the Bismarck at the earliest opportunity. The two squadrons of Albacores he had did not have sufficient range to attack the battleship whilst in harbour. He was relying on the Royal Air Force to carry out flights over Bergen, and inform the Royal Navy when the Battleship had left port. On 22 May 1941 RAF Coastal Command deemed the weather unsuitable for flight; however, Fancourt volunteered to put together a crew to fly 771's Martin Maryland twin-engined plane to carry out the sortie. Temporary Lieutenant (A) Noel Ernest Goddard, RNVR, at the time the Senior Pilot of 771 NAS, volunteered to pilot the sortie, with his crew of Acting Leading Airman John Walker Armstrong as TAG-WO and Leading Airman J. D. Milne as TAG-AG. The extremely experienced observer Commander Geoffry Alexander Rotherham, at the time the Air Station's XO, stepped up to act as Mission Commander. Goddard flew on instruments at low level over the sea, making landfall on target. Having identified that the ships had sailed already they attempted to radio their discovery back to RAF Coastal Command. However, they did not receive any reply. Rotherham decided to contact the Air Station directly on the Towed Target frequency and also fly directly to HMS Sparrowhawk's forward airfield, Sumburgh, where the Albacores were ready to intercept. Acting on Rotherhams's radio message, the Home Fleet were set to sea and engage the Bismarck and her escorts intercepting her at the Battle of the Denmark Straits. On 16 September 1941 The London Gazette reported the awarding of the following honours: Rotherham received the DSO, Goddard the DSC, and Armstrong the DSM. Goddard went on to Command 771 NAS as a Temporary Lieutenant Commander (A) on 15 October 1941. On 1 July 1942 771 NAS moved to RNAS Twatt to fly more modern aircraft in a similar role.

=== Post Second World War ===
In February 1945, 771 received the Sikorsky Hoverfly, making it the first naval air squadron to operate helicopters, which it used until May 1947. After victory in Europe the Fleet moved from Scapa Flow to Portsmouth and the anchorage at Portland. 771 NAS followed south to RNAS Zeals and then to RNAS Lee-on-Solent and RNAS Ford. Here the Squadron flew Miles Martinets, Douglas Bostons, Vought Corsairs, Grumman Wildcats, Airspeed Oxfords, Grumman Hellcats, Supermarine Seafires, North American Harvards, de Havilland Mosquitoes, Hawker Sea Furys, Short Sturgeons, as well as the Hoverfly. The Hoverflies were transferred to 705 Naval Air Squadron as it was formed. During the Defence reductions following the Second World War it was decided that 771 would be disbanded in August 1955 (whilst operating the Avro Anson, de Havilland Sea Hornet, Gloster Meteor, de Havilland Sea Vampire and Fairey Firefly) when it combined with 703 Naval Air Squadron to form 700 Naval Air Squadron.

=== Helicopter-only squadron ===
771 NAS reformed in 1961 and assumed the helicopter trials and training roles from 700 NAS with the Westland Whirlwind, Westland Dragonfly, and the Westland Wasp prototype at RNAS Portland. During this time 771 was able to pioneer and develop many Search And Rescue techniques; including helicopter in-flight refueling (HIFR), hi-line transfer, free diver drop and cliff winching techniques. Soon after standing up again, the Squadron gained two Westland Whirlwind HAR.3s and assumed the RNAS Portland SAR commitment. The Squadron was disbanded on 1 December 1964, on being absorbed into 829 Naval Air Squadron.

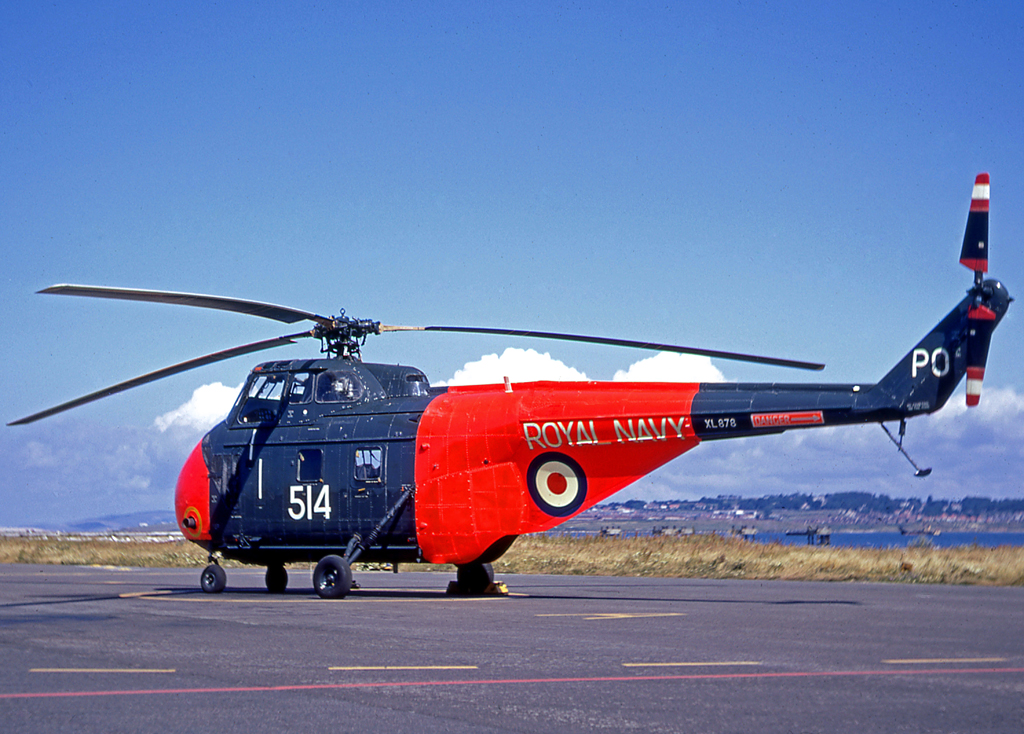
771 Squadron Westland Whirlwind HAS.7 SAR rescue helicopter at Portland in 1967.

On 23 June 1967, the squadron reformed with the new primary task of anti-submarine warfare (ASW) Fleet Requirements Unit, in addition to the Portland SAR duty. Nine Whirlwind HAS.7 were used by the Squadron at this time. The Westland Wessex was introduced in 1969 with the Mk 1. This marked the beginning of a long association of the aircraft with the squadron. By 1970, the ASW role had been passed on to 737 Naval Air Squadron, making SAR 771's primary role, a role that has remained to the present day.

The Squadron moved to RNAS Culdrose in September 1974. Six of its Wessex aircraft were left at RNAS Portland, to form the basis of 772 Naval Air Squadron. The Wessex HAS.1 was replaced by the twin turbine-powered Wessex HU.5 in 1979, when it was involved with the 1979 Fastnet race rescues. During the Falklands Conflict all of 771 aircraft were taken for troop transport roles, some went to 722 Naval Air Squadron, but the majority reformed 847 Naval Air Squadron and 848 Naval Air Squadron along with some of 771 NASs aircrew. The remaining crew went either to their old aircraft type, or to new roles in the Lynx or Wasp fleets. Two Wessex Mk.5 from Wroughton were used in August 1982 to form the backbone of 771 NAS as it took the SAR commitment back from the RAF. In January 1983 the Squadron once again operated mixed fleets of rotary and fixed wing aircraft as it absorbed the Station Flight, taking ownership of two Chipmunks and 2 Sea Devons. It operated these until the end of 1989 when the Sea Devon was withdrawn from service. In 1985 the Squadron absorbed 707 Naval Air Squadron's Wessex helicopters when 771 NAS took over Commando Helicopter Training. The Wessex were replaced by Westland Sea King HAS.5s, converted to HAR.5s, in October 1987 as the Squadron assumed a long range, day/night and all weather SAR capability. In July 2001, 771 Squadron assumed the responsibility for Advanced and Operational Flying Training for anti-submarine warfare (ASW) pilots and Observers, as well as the residual Sea King HAS.5 & HAS.6 Pilot Conversion and Refresher Courses.

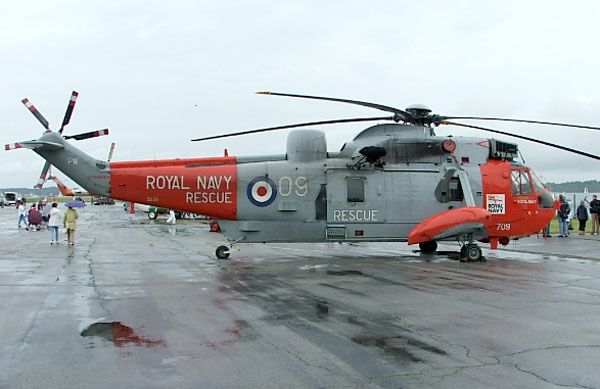

In its final years the Squadron operated the Sea King HAR.5 in the grey and red colours, with nine permanently stationed at RNAS Culdrose. 771's sister unit, Gannet Flight operates 3 HAR.5s performing a similar role from HMS Gannet on Prestwick Airport. 771's primary role was one of military Search and Rescue, with secondary roles in civilian Search and Rescue, Pilot and Observer refresher training, utility and liaison and ab-initio Pilot Conversion and operational training. To perform these roles, one of the helicopters was on 15 minutes notice to fly during the day, and 45 minutes during the night, with a duty crew on call for 24 hours. This duty was maintained for 365 days of the year, with a second standby aircraft ready to assist should the emergency have demanded it.

It stopped rescue duties on 1 January 2016 and was decommissioned on 22 March 2016. The squadron was responsible for saving over 15,000 lives on more than 9,000 missions.

== Ace of Clubs ==
771s Helicopters feature the unofficial Ace of Clubs Squadron Logo. The origin of this logo is unclear, but it is widely believed to follow a similar pedigree as the Royal Navy Historic Flight Hawker Sea Hawk, wearing 806 NAS's Ace of Diamonds logo. Shortly after the Second World War Squadrons of the Fleet Air Arm often had an in-house display team. Each of the display aircraft were painted with identification marks. Playing card suits were chosen by some Squadrons as they were a neat identification that allows clear hierarchy; the Squadron Commanding Officer would take the Ace card, the XO the King and so on until each aircraft had a value relating to the seniority in the Squadron/display team of that pilot. Today 771 does not assign an aircraft to each pilot, instead operating a pool of aircraft allowing each pilot to fly any helicopter. It was chosen that only the Ace of Clubs would be painted on each of the helicopters in the Squadrons fleet.

== Rescues ==
771 NAS was one of the busiest SAR units in the UK being called out an average of 220 times per year. With the limitations in civilian flight rules for the Cornwall Air Ambulance pilots 771 was also often called upon to perform patient and hospital transfers throughout the West Country. These were typically when the Air Ambulance was engaged in other duties, in poor weather, at night or where no suitable landing place was close by, allowing the Sea King to utilise its winch. Individual honours have included 4 George Medals, 4 Air Force Crosses, 6 Queens Gallantry Medals, and 14 Queen's Commendation for Bravery awards. Some of the more memorable rescues have been:

- 1978 – Ben Asdale, Air Force Cross awarded to Lt AJM Hogg RN, and Lt Cdr MJ Norman RN
- 1979 – Fastnet Race, Air Force Cross awarded to Lt Jerry Grayson for his role in the Fastnet '79 Race. It was awarded a year later in 1980.
- 1985 – Fastnet Race, George Medal awarded to the Rescue Diver; POACMN L Slater for his rescue of Simon Le Bon and 19 other survivors from the Yacht Drum
- 1985 – Yacht Master Cube
- 1989 – MV Secil Japan, Air Force Medal awarded to the Rescue Diver CPOACMN JPR Grinney
- 1989 – MV Murree, George Medal awarded to each of the 2 Rescue Divers; POACMN DS Wallace, POACMN SW Wright
- 1992 – Boyd Trophy won for night rescue of five crew from yacht Sine Seorra off Guernsey, Air Force Medal awarded to LA I Chambers
- 2004 – Boyd Trophy won for Boscastle Flood rescues, Air Force Cross awarded to Lt Cdr MJ Ford RN
- 2005 – Boyd Trophy won for the recovery of critically ill crewman from fishing vessel 240 miles off coast in gale-force winds and very poor visibility
- 2007 – MSC Napoli, PO J O'Donnel awarded Queen's Gallantry Medal
- 2008 – Pesca del Verdes, CPOACMN D Rigg awarded Queen's Gallantry Medal
- 2009 – Fishing Vessel Trevessa, PO D Lacy awarded Queen's Gallantry Medal
- 2011 – Yacht Andriette, Sgt A Russell RM awarded George Medal for his role in the rescue

== RN SAR 60 ==
As one of only two commissioned units of the ten that have operated in the dedicated Royal Navy Search and Rescue role, 771 NAS were a core part of the year-long celebration to recognise 60 years of RN Helicopter Search and Rescue in 2013. Events took place throughout the country and media all year, with the RN SAR Force raising £60,000 for charity.

== Aircraft operated ==
There are 68 different marks of aircraft known to have been operated by 771 NAS.

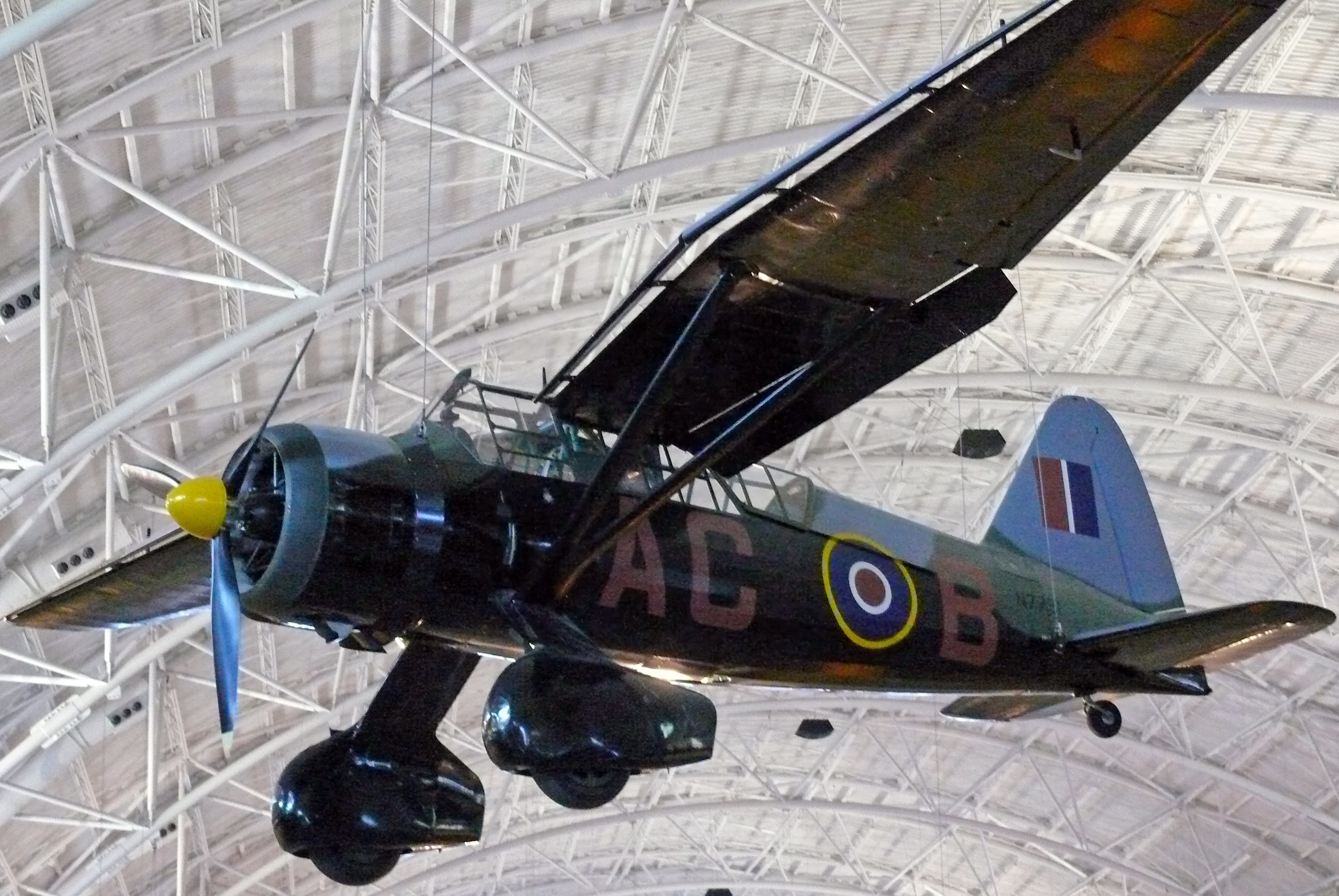
Lysander

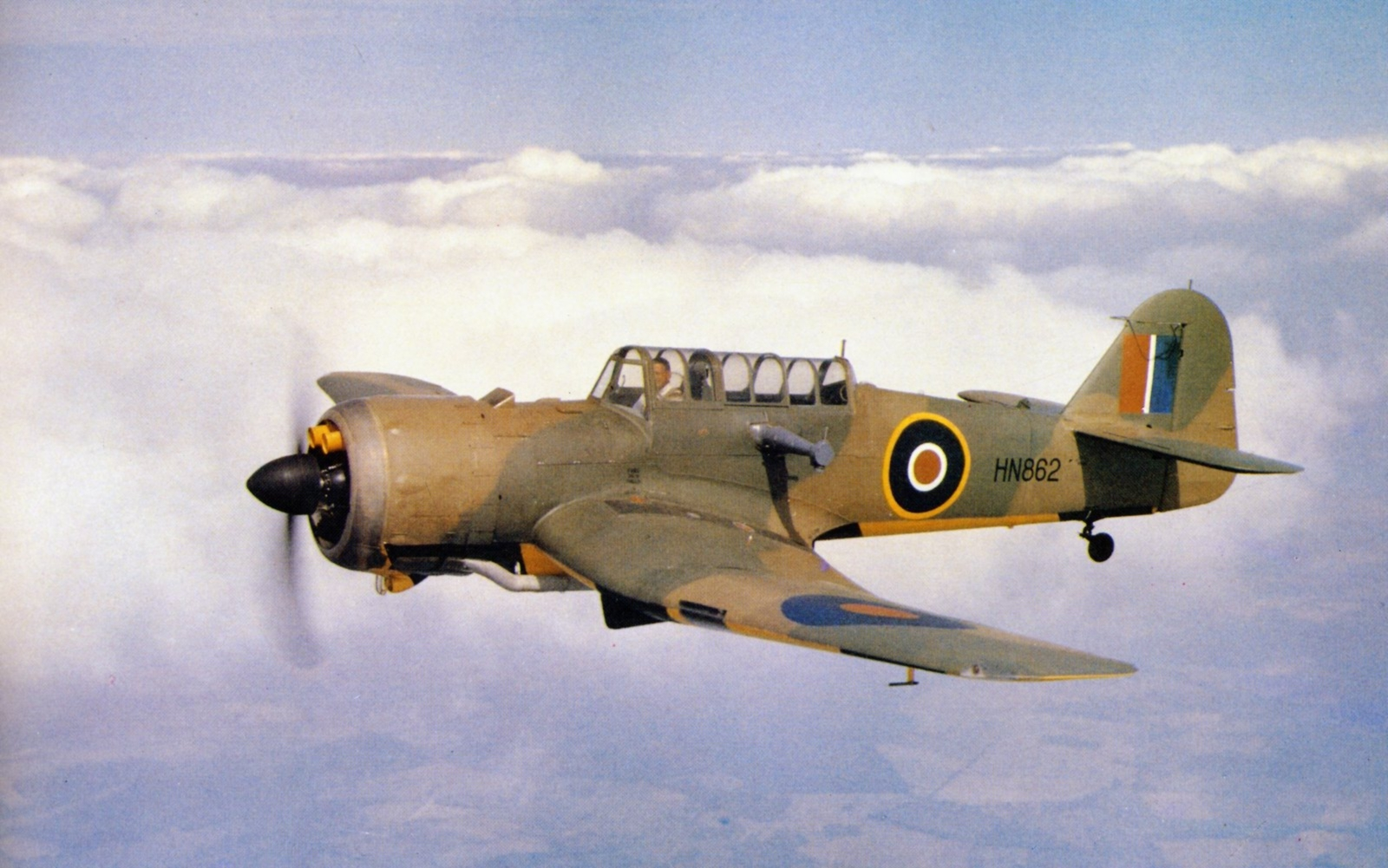
Martinet TT.1

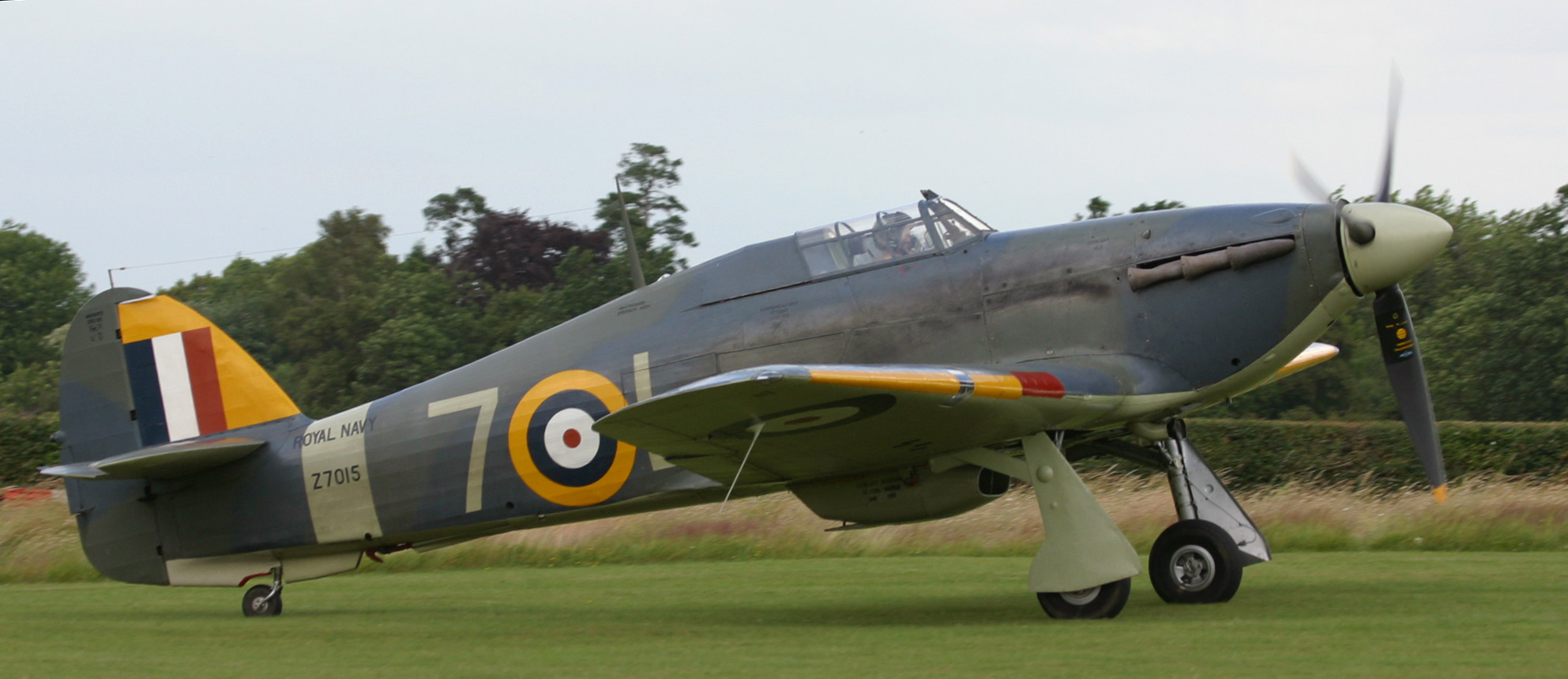
Royal Navy Hurricane

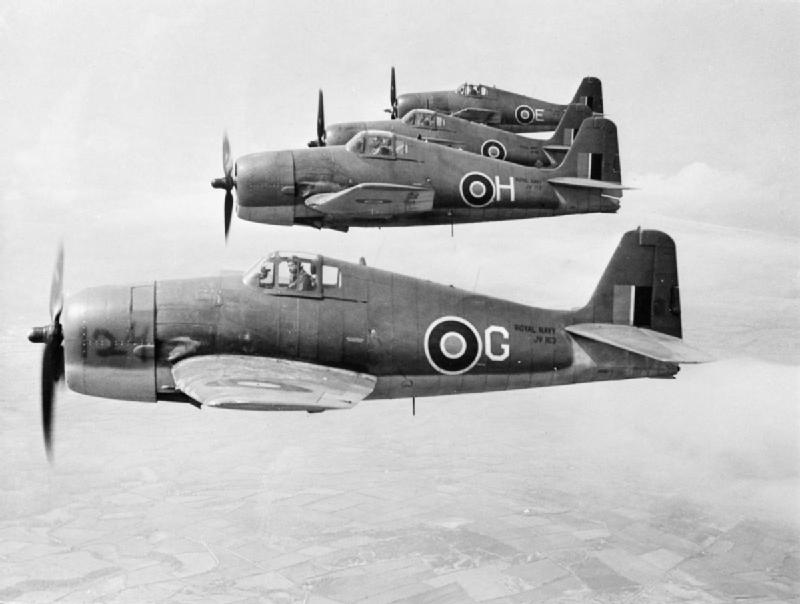
Hellcat

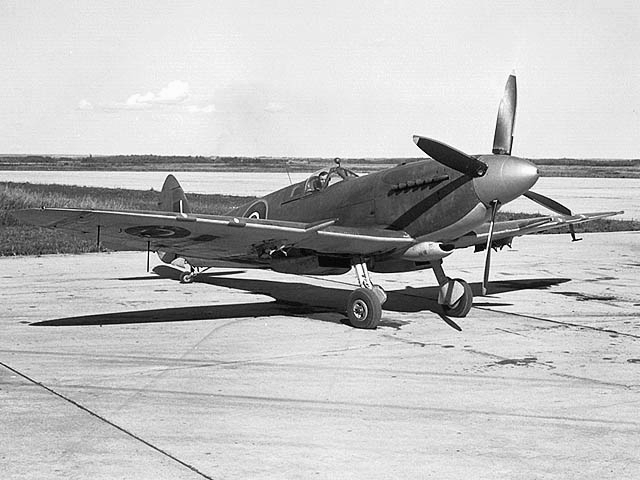
Seafire F.15

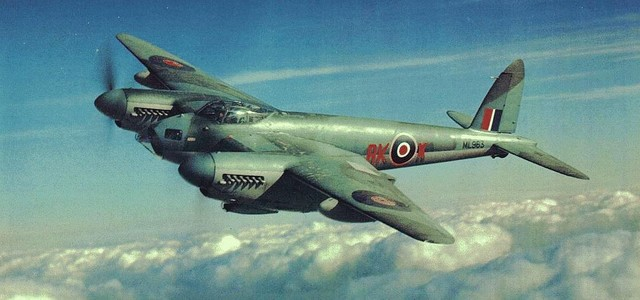
Mosquito Mk.16

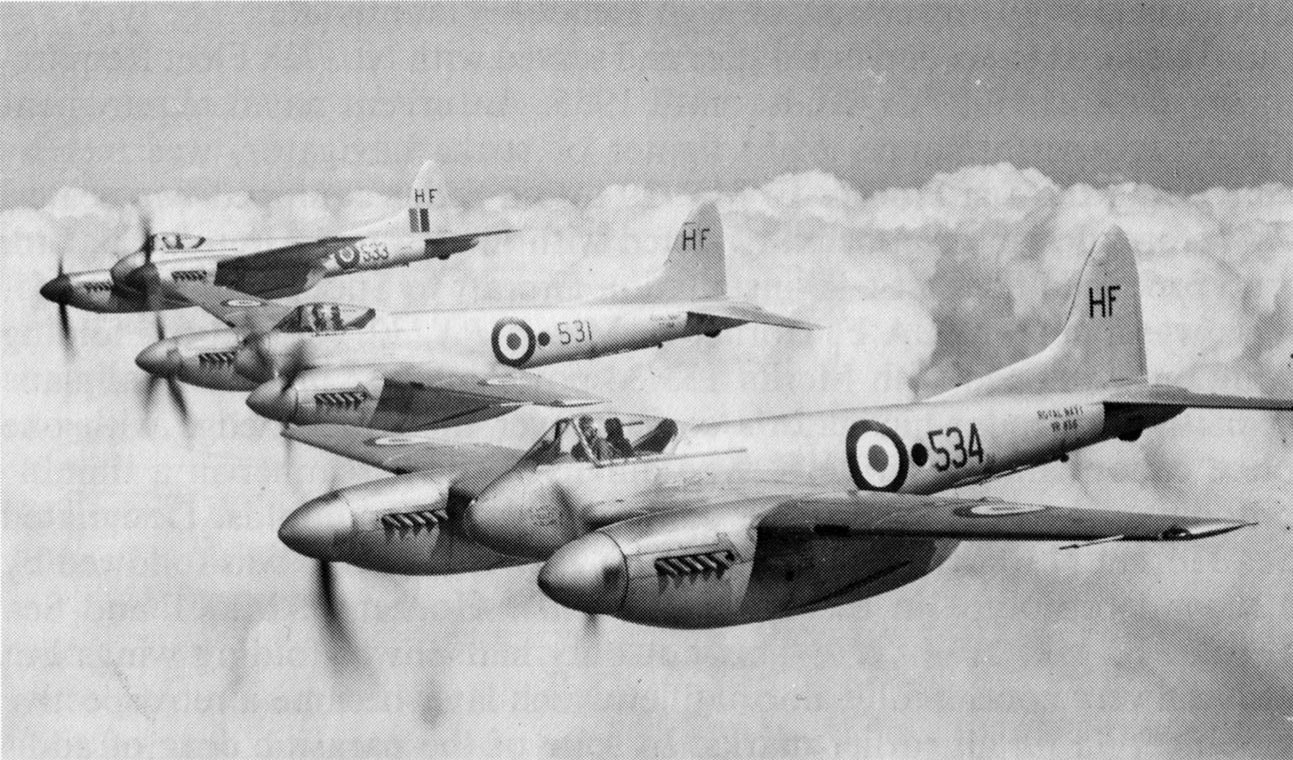
Sea Hornet FR.20

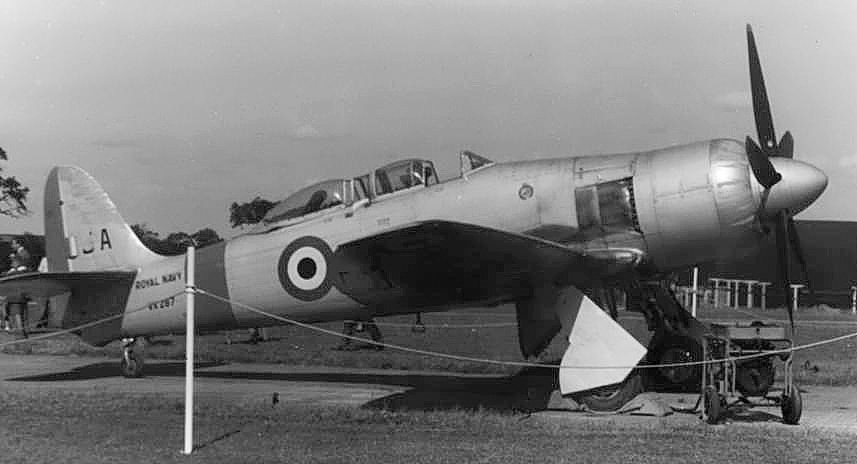
Sea Fury T.20

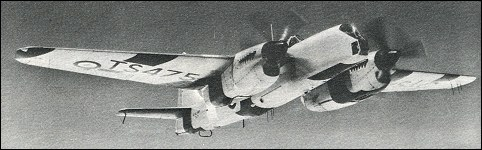
Sturgeon TT.2

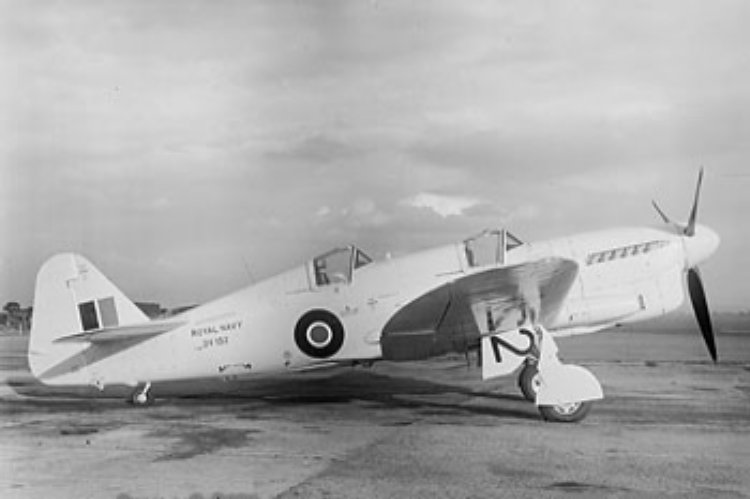
Firefly T.1

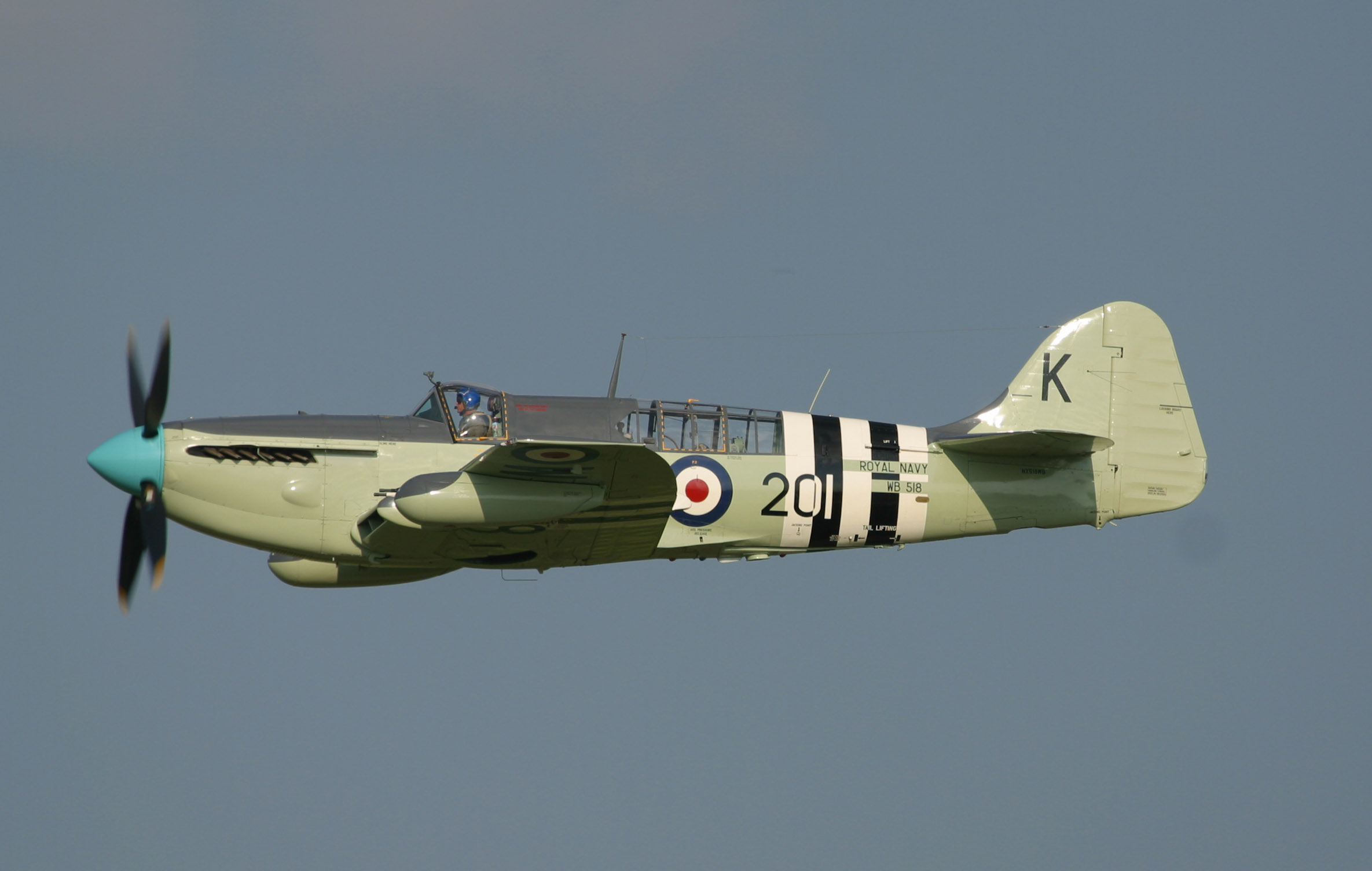
Firefly AS.6

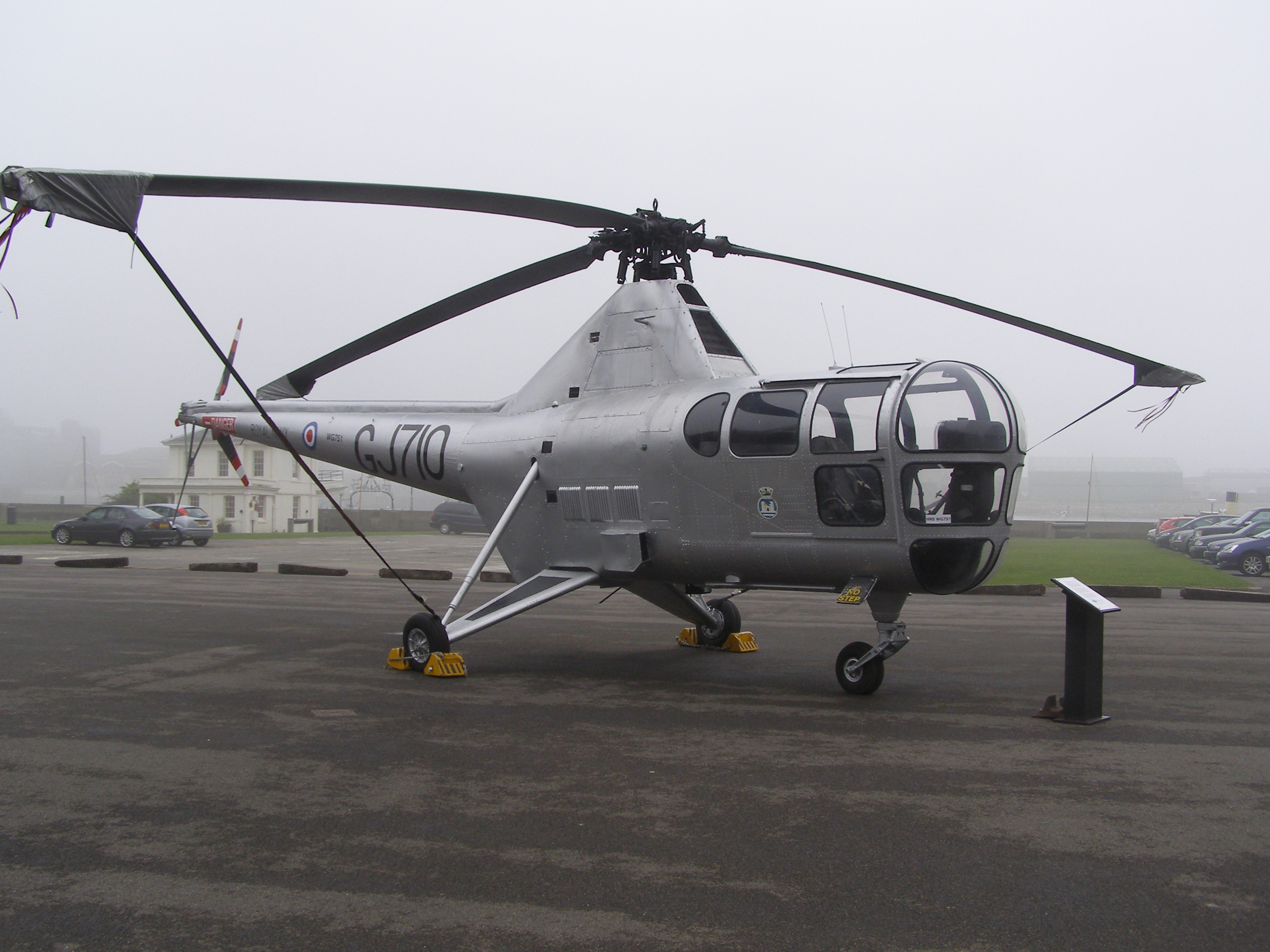
Dragonfly

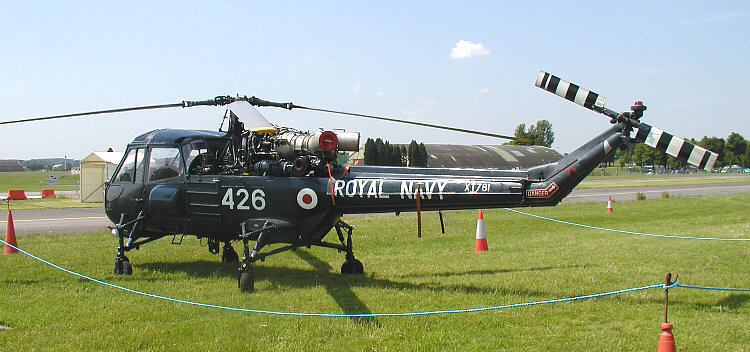
Westland Wasp HAS.1

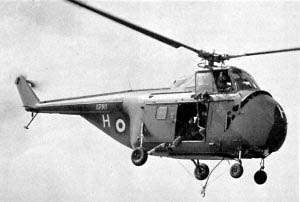
Whirlwind

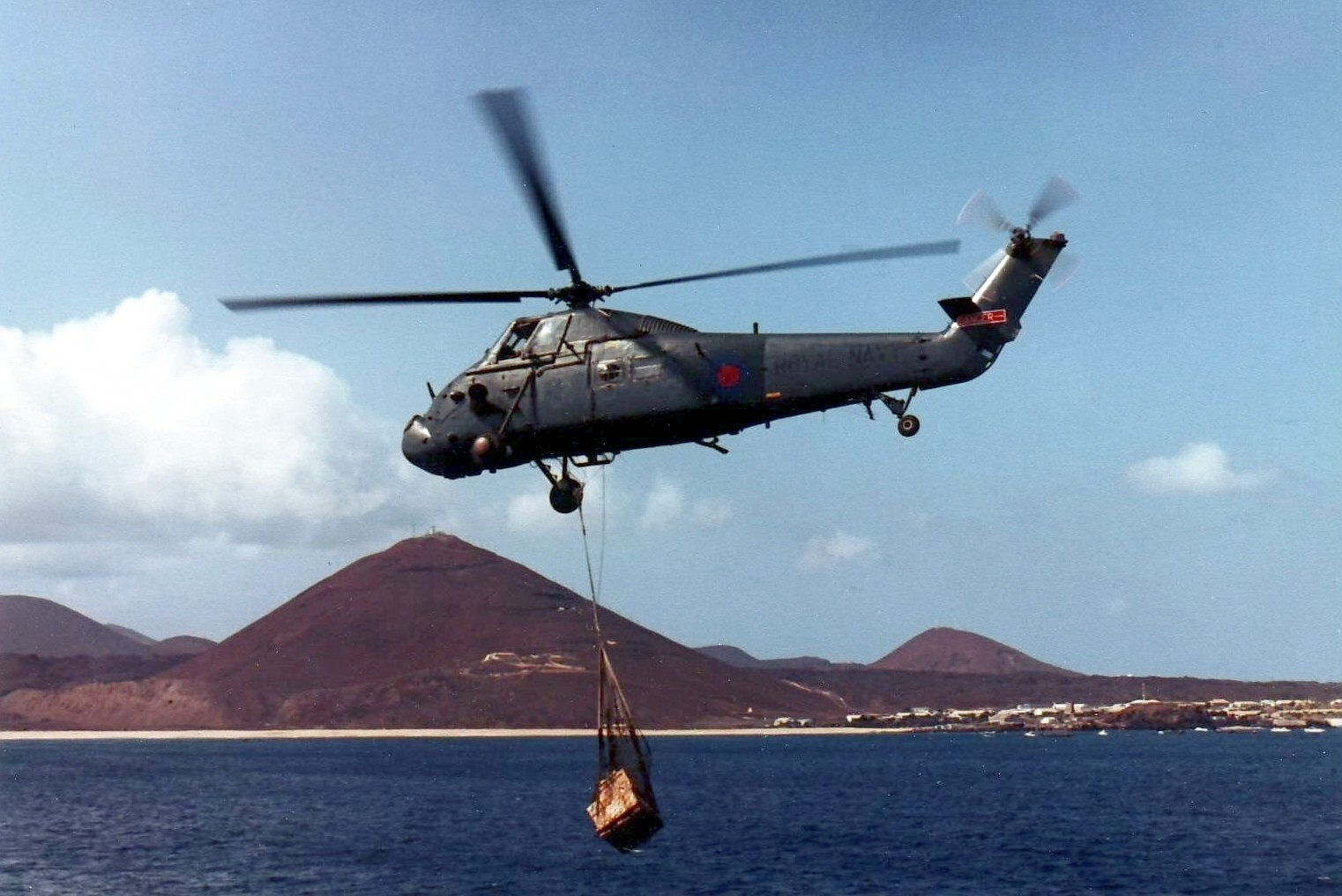
Wessex HU.5 similar given to 847 NAS and 848 NAS for the Falklands Conflict

Aircraft Equipment	Entered service	Left service
Swordfish	May 1939	Apr 1945
Henley III	Oct 1939	Aug 1943
Walrus I	Nov 1939	Feb 1940
Skua II	Apr 1940	Apr 1943
Roc I	Apr 1940	May 1944
Albacore I	Nov 1941	?
Blenheim I	Apr 1941	Jun 1943
Blenheim IV	Apr 1944	May 1945
Sea Gladiator	Dec 1941	Jun 1944
Maryland	Oct 1940	Sep 1944
Walrus	Mar 1944	Jun 1944
Defiant TT.1	Jun 1942	Aug 1943
Chesapeake I	May 1942	Apr 1944
Proctor Ia	Aug 1942	Oct 1943
Lysander TT.III	Jul 1943	Dec 1943
Martinet TT.I	Aug 1943	Oct 1951
Havoc I	Dec 1942	Sep 1944
Boston II	Nov 1943	Aug 1944
Boston III	Feb 1944	Aug 1944
Hurricane FB.IIc	May 1944	Apr 1945
Sea Otter	Apr 1944	Aug 1949
Corsair II	Sep 1944	Apr 1945
Corsair III	Dec 1944	Sep 1945
Wildcat IV	Jul 1945	Nov 1945
Wildcat V	Nov 1945	Mar 1946
Wildcat VI	Oct 1945	Mar 1946
Oxford I	Mar 1946	?
Hellcat I	Sep 1945	?
Hoverfly I	Feb 1945	May 1947
Hoverfly II	Dec 1945	May 1947
Seafire III	Mar 1946	Jan 1947
Seafire F.15	Nov 1946	Jan 1951
Seafire F.45	Dec 1947	Sep 1950
Seafire F.46	May 1947	Dec 1947
Anson I	Apr 1947	Aug 1955
Harvard T.2B	Jan 1948	?
Mosquito FB.6	Jul 1950	Apr 1952
Mosquito PR.16	Dec 1948	Aug 1952
Mosquito B.25	Aug 1945	May 1947
Sea Mosquito TR.33	May 1947	Mar 1950
Mosquito PR.34	Nov 1948	Jan 1950
Sea Mosquito TR.37	Dec 1948	Jul 1949
Mosquito TT.39	Jan 1950	Jan 1952
Sea Hornet FR.20	May 1950	Jun 1950
Sea Hornet NF.21	Jan 1950	Oct 1952
Sea Fury T.20	Jul 1950	Dec 1950
Meteor T.7	May 1950	Mar 1955
Sea Vampire F.20	Mar 1952	Aug 1955
Sea Vampire F.21	Jan 1951	Sep 1951
Sturgeon TT.2	Sep 1950	Nov 1952
Firefly FR.1	Jan 1950	Jul 1955
Firefly T.1	Jul 1950	?
Firefly T.2	Jul 1950	Aug 1952
Firefly TT.4	Nov 1951	Aug 1955
Firefly TT.5	Jun 1952	?
Firefly AS.6	Oct 1950	Dec 1953
Dragonfly HR.5	Jul 1961	Oct 1963
Wasp P-531 O/N	Jul 1961	Dec 1964
Wasp HAS.1	Nov 1963	Dec 1964
Whirlwind HAR.1	Jul 1961	Jul 1961
Whirlwind HAR.3	Oct 1961	Mar 1964
Whirlwind HAS.7	Aug 1962	Jan 1965
Whirlwind HAS.7 (2^{nd} service period)	Jun 1967	Jan 1970
Whirlwind HAS.22	Jul 1961	Nov 1961
Wessex HAS.1	Dec 1963	Dec 1963
Wessex HAS.1(2^{nd} service period)	Dec 1969	Jul 1979
Wessex HU.5	Mar 1979	Mar 1988
Chipmunk T.10	Jan 1983	Mar 1993
Sea Devon C.20	Jan 1983	Dec 1989
Sea King HAR.5	Oct 1987	Mar 2016

== Commanding officers ==
Rank	Name	Date
Lt Cdr	KW Beard RN	24 May 1939
Lt Cdr	FEC Judd RN	13 September 1940
Maj	AR Burch RM	15 January 1941
Lt Cdr (A)	NE Goddard DSC RNVR	15 October 1941
Lt Cdr (A)	HT Molyneaux RNVR	4 May 1942
Lt Cdr (A)	W Dobson RN	13 February 1944
Lt Cdr( A)	CC Burke RNZNVR	11 April 1945
Lt Cdr	GMT Osborn DSO DSC RN	24 October 1945
Lt Cdr	CR Bateman RN	23 February 1948
Lt Cdr (A)	RWM Walsh RN	7 January 1949
Lt Cdr	JG Baldwin DSC RN	18 November 1949
Lt Cdr	JA Welpy RN	19 December 1950
Lt Cdr	MW Rudorf DSC RN	5 May 1952
Lt Cdr	Pridham-Wippell RN	15 September 1952
Lt Cdr	BE Bullivant RN	3 June 1953
Lt Cdr	RW Turral RN	28 March 1955
	squadron disbanded	17 August 1955
Lt Cdr	AIR Shaw MBE RN	11 July 1961
Lt Cdr	RV Woodward RN	23 March 1962
Lt Cdr	JRJ Rutherford RN	28 March 1964
	squadron disbanded	1 December 1964
Lt Cdr	JT Rawlins MBE RN	23 June 1967
Lt Cdr	R McLean MVO RN	14 August 1968
Lt Cdr	I Lachlan RN	20 May 1970
Lt Cdr	CL MacGregor RN	4 October 1971
Lt Cdr	RN Woodard RN	5 September 1974
Lt Cdr	CP West RN	16 September 1974
Lt Cdr	KJMcK Ayres RN	16 June 1976
Lt Cdr	R Mortimer RN	10 May 1978
Lt Cdr	PA Fish RN	28 September 1979
Lt Cdr	NB Shaw RN	23 February 1981
Lt Cdr	GRK Gadsden RN	20 September 1982
Lt Cdr	EK Bramall RN	10 January 1983
Lt Cdr	RHS Everall RN	8 April 1983
Lt Cdr	DR George RN	15 October 1985
Lt Cdr	MJ Lawrence RN	18 December 1988
Lt Cdr	IS Dominey RN	28 July 1989
Lt Cdr	SD Pendrich AFC RN	15 March 1991
Lt Cdr	L Matthews RN	23 July 1993
Lt Cdr	GBM Milton RN	5 March 1996
Lt Cdr	PC Richings RN	19 May 1998
Lt Cdr	D Whitehead RN	7 July 2000
Lt Cdr	DA Cunningham RN	6 August 2002
Lt Cdr	JC Barnbrook RN	21 July 2004
Lt Cdr	CA Godwin RN	24 July 2006
Lt Cdr	GJ Finn RN	27 July 2008
Lt Cdr	CP Canning RN	30 March 2010
Lt Cdr	MP Shepherd RN	29 March 2012
Cdr	MP Shepherd RN	30 June 2013
Lt Cdr	ST Armstrong RN	4 April 2014
Lt Cdr	RT Calhaem RN	12 January 2015

== See also ==
- History of Royal Navy Helicopter Search and Rescue
