= History of Royal Navy Helicopter Search and Rescue =

The History of Royal Navy Helicopter Search and Rescue has its roots in the adoption by the Royal Navy of helicopters in the plane guard role. From a purely military tasking Royal Navy squadrons came to share the provision of search and rescue SAR coverage for the United Kingdom with the Royal Air Force and commercial providers under contract to Her Majesty's Coastguard, being responsible for two sectors out of twelve. From 2015 both the RAF and the Navy will surrender the civilian SAR role to contractors operating on behalf of the Coastguard.

== Early SAR ==
Royal Navy Search and Rescue had been conducted by helicopters at sea since their introduction on warships. It was decided in 1953 to provide a dedicated helicopter Search and Rescue capability for downed Fleet Air Arm pilots from their home shore establishments. The first Royal Navy Air Stations to stand up their SAR units in 1953 were:

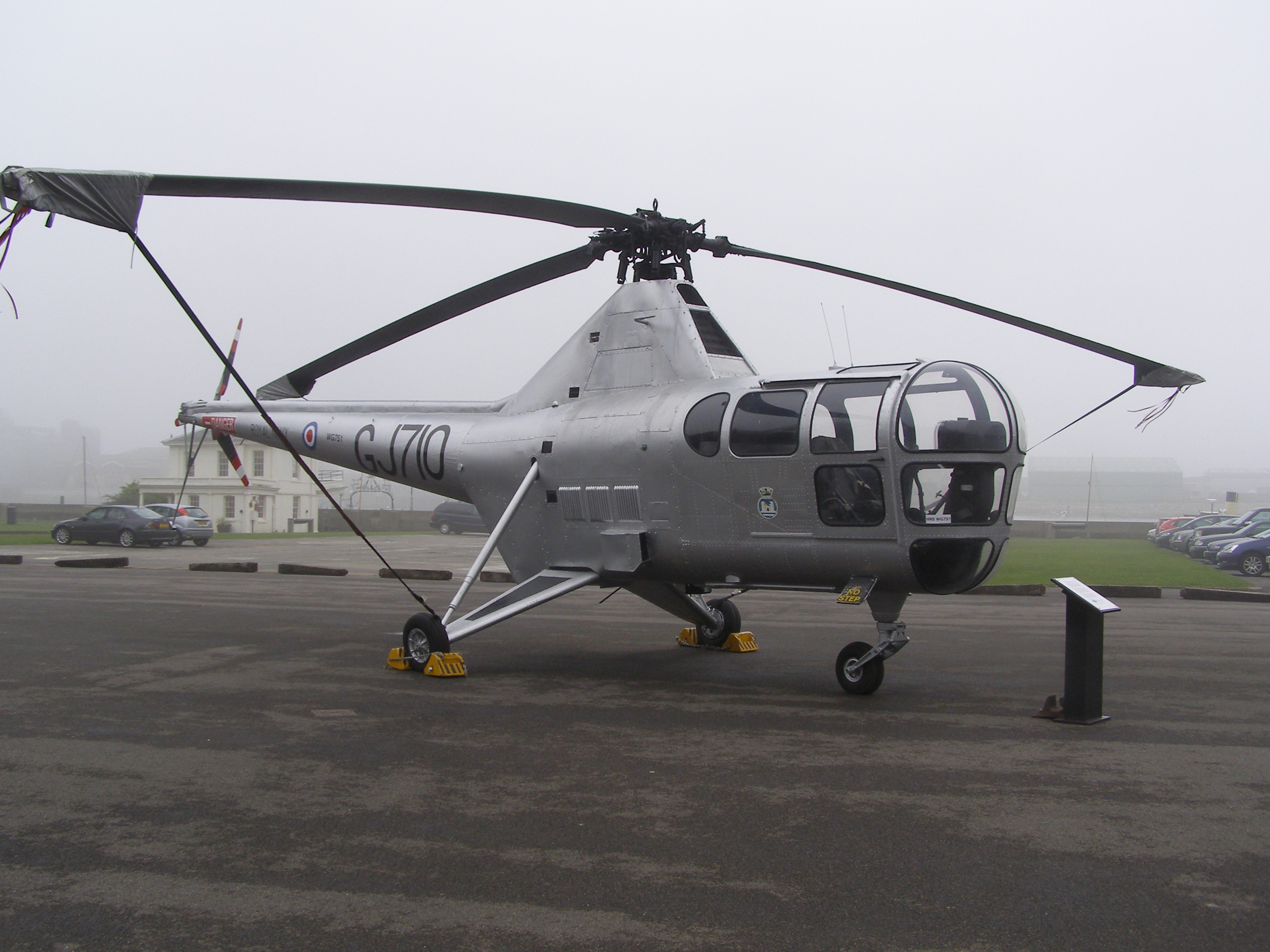
Westland Dragonfly

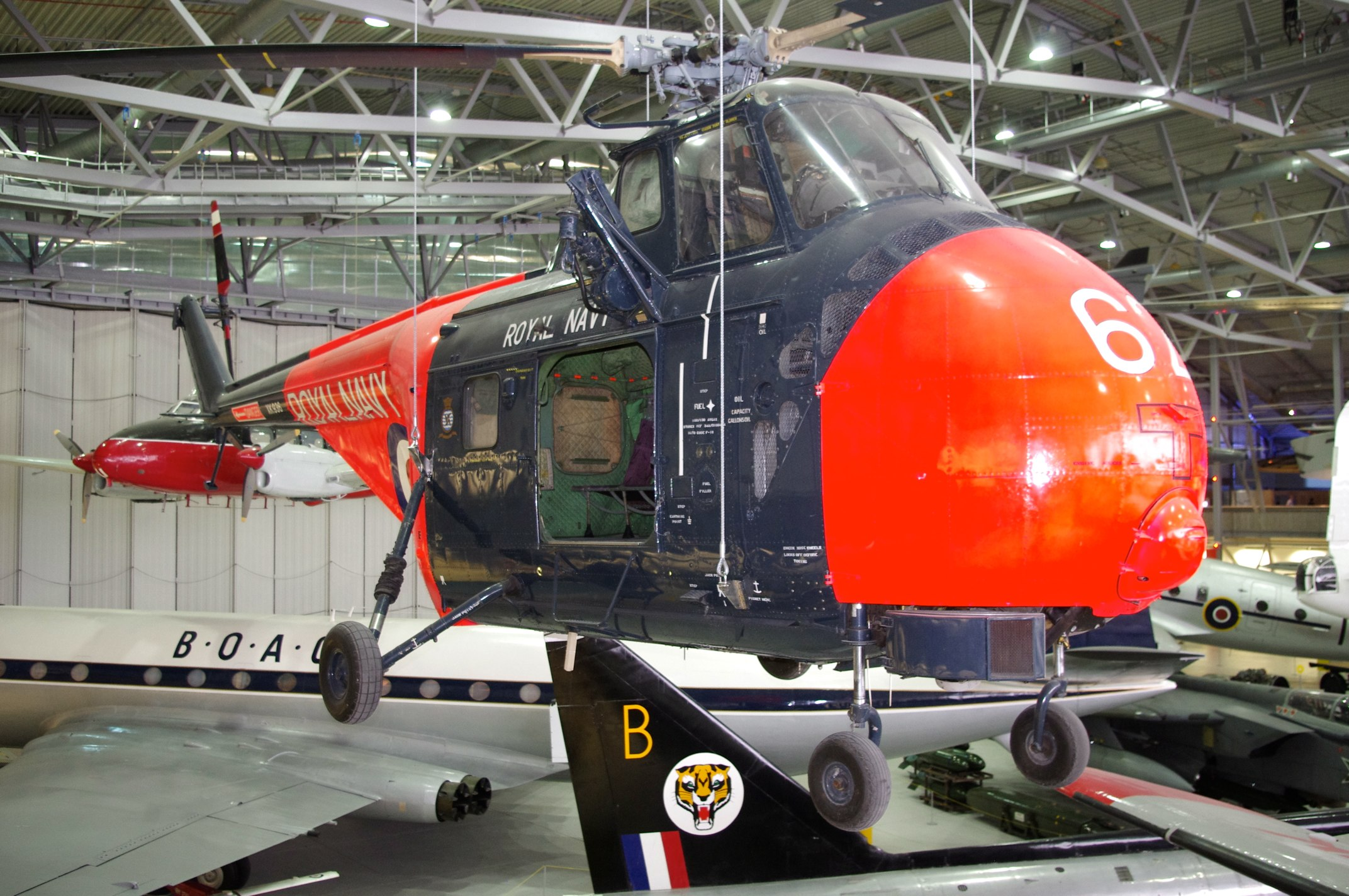
Westland Whirlwind

- RNAS Anthorn (HMS Nuthatch)
- RNAS Brawdy (HMS Goldcrest)
- RNAS Culdrose (HMS Seahawk)
- RNAS Eglinton (HMS Gannet)
- RNAS Ford (HMS Peregrine)
- RNAS Gosport (HMS Siskin)
- RNAS Lossiemouth (HMS Fulmar)

The Westland Dragonfly would remain in service in the SAR role with the Royal Navy, alongside the Westland Whirlwind, until 1964. The Whirlwind had a greater range of 300 nmi and was faster with a maximum airspeed of 95 kn. More complicated rescues would also be undertaken by the Whirlwinds with their increased crew size and rescue capabilities. The Whirlwind HAR.5 had space to rescue 8 people.

=== East Anglia and Netherlands Flooding 1953 ===
An urgent request for help was given to the Royal Navy after the extensive North Sea flooding of East Anglia and the Netherlands on the night of 31 January 1953. 12 Dragonfly HR.1 and HR.3 helicopters were dispatched from 705 Naval Air Squadron from their base at RNAS Gosport (HMS Siskin). During the 7 hours flying in response to the floods 840 people were rescued; one single pilot was responsible for 111 of these, and another for 102. For the life-saving efforts the commanding officer, Lt Cdr HR Spedding, was awarded the MBE and Aircrewman IS Craig the British Empire Medal.

== Later years ==
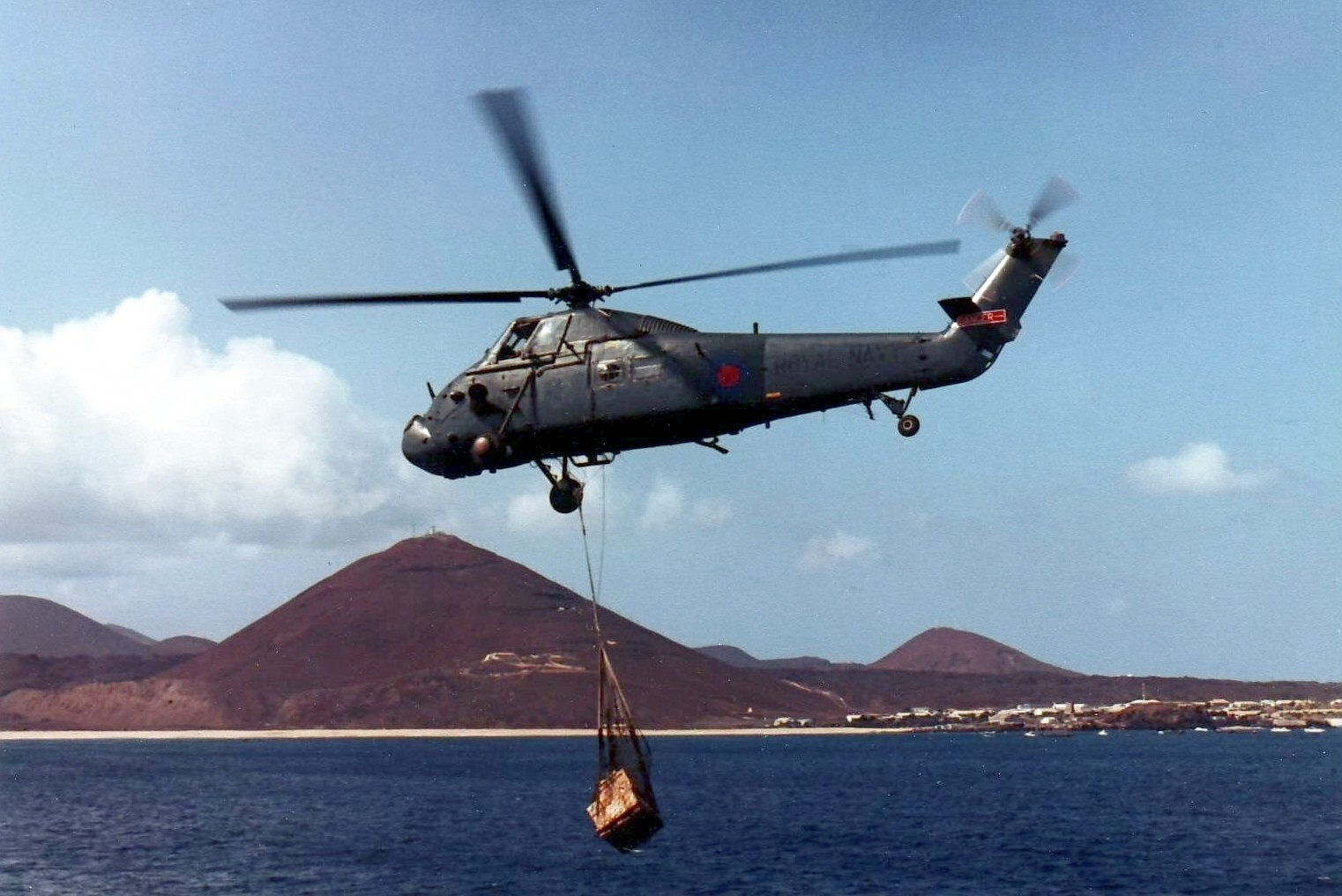
Westland Wessex (Commando role)

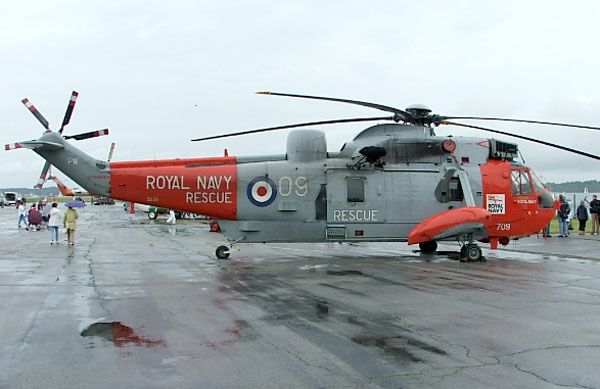
Westland Sea King HAR.5

The replacement of the Dragonfly and Whirlwind in the Royal Navy with the Westland Wessex in 1964 led to a greater maximum range of 478 nmi for these SAR units. The Wessex had a greater maximum airspeed of 115 kn and space to rescue 16 people. These aircraft were used to save the lives of two SAS canoeists who found themselves in difficulty off the South Wales coast on 18 March 1963. The pilot, Lt. R.E. Smith, was awarded an MBE for his actions during this rescue. (This rescue was not undertaken by SAR dedicated crew, but a Commando Role crew. All Royal Navy aircrew are trained in search and rescue techniques). A Wessex HAS.1 of 706 Naval Air Squadron was used to rescue a lighthouse keeper from Longships Lighthouse off Lands End in 1968. The pilot, Lt. D. Blythe, was awarded the MBE for this rescue.

The Wessex fleet was complemented in 1969 by the introduction of the Westland Sea King to Fleet Air Arm (FAA) service. The Wessex continued to provide SAR with the Sea King in its intended role as an ASW helicopter throughout the FAA. The Sea King was called upon for more distant SAR call-outs due to its increased range of 598 nmi and greater endurance of over 4 hours. One of the new Sea King aircraft from RNAS Culdrose was involved in the daring rescue of the crew from the Danish SS Merc Enterprise which had capsized in heavy seas south of Plymouth in January 1974. With waves of 50 feet and severe winds of 70 mph, the crew managed to save many of the survivors with the pilots, Lt Cdr DS Mallock and Lt AR Baker being awarded the Air Force Cross. The aircrew, POAcmn DJD Fowles; POAcmn DJ Jackson and APOAcmn AT Williams, were each awarded the Air Force Medal.

The capable pairing of Wessex and Sea King were directly responsible for increasing the number of rescues during this period. The Sea King's increased rescue capacity also led to an increase in the number of gallantry awards given to the SAR crews.

The introduction of the Sea King Mk.5, specifically for SAR in April 1988, was another step-change in capability for RN SAR. Sea King HAS.5s were stripped of their ASW equipment to enable them to carry even more fuel for long range rescue missions. With an almost empty cabin area the HAR.5s had plenty of space for specialist rescue equipment, medical equipment and increased passenger space; this aircraft was the backbone of the Royal Navy SAR fleet until 2015, when the service was privatised.

Until 2015, Royal Navy SAR service was provided by two different squadrons: 771 Naval Air Squadron and Gannet SAR Flight based at RNAS Culdrose (HMS Seahawk) and Prestwick (HMS Gannet) respectively.

== Units ==
- 705 Naval Air Squadron (1953-1974)
- 771 Naval Air Squadron (1961-2015)
- HMS Gannet SAR Flight (2001-2015)
- 772 Naval Air Squadron (1974-1995)
- 819 Naval Air Squadron (1971-2001)

== Standing down ==
In March 2013 the Department for Transport announced that it had a signed a contract with Bristow Helicopters Ltd to provide search and rescue helicopter services in the UK with operations commencing progressively from 2015. The new service was expected to be fully operational across the United Kingdom by summer 2017 and would utilize AgustaWestland AW189 and Sikorsky S-92 based at ten locations around the UK.

== See also ==
- RAF Search and Rescue Force
- Royal Navy SAR 60
