= 819 Naval Air Squadron =

Inactive flying squadron of the Royal Navy's Fleet Air Arm

- Squadron badge
- Active: 1940–1941; 1941–1945; 1961–1971; 1971–2001
- Disbanded: 19 November 2001
- Country: United Kingdom
- Branch: Royal Navy
- Type: Torpedo Bomber Reconnaissance squadron
- Role: Carrier-based: anti-submarine warfare (ASW); anti-surface warfare (ASuW); Search and Rescue (SAR)
- Part of: Fleet Air Arm
- Home station: See Naval air stations section for full list.
- Mottos: Redem feri claudum (Latin for 'Strike the foot that limps'); Partem infirmissimam petito (Latin for 'Strike at the weakest point') (1991)
- Aircraft: See Aircraft flown section for full list.
- Engagements: World War II; Western Desert campaign; Battle of Taranto; Battle of the Atlantic; Arctic convoys of World War II; Operation Neptune; Cold War
- Battle honours: Mediterranean 1940-41; Libya 1940; Taranto 1940; Atlantic 1943-44; Arctic 1944; North Sea 1944-45; Normandy 1944

Insignia
- Squadron Badge Description: Blue, a foot coupled at the ankle in a sandal gold pierced though the heel by an arrow white (1945)
- Identification Markings: L5A+ (Swordfish); 5A+ (Swordfish May 1940 to January 1941); single letters (Swordfish October 1941); single letters (Martlet/Wildcat); 320-325 (Wessex); 530-533 (Wessex July 1965); 300-310 (Sea King); 700-708 (Sea King February 1981)
- Fin Carrier/Shore Codes: H:R:CU (Wessex); CU:PW (Sea King); PW (Sea King February 1981)

819 Naval Air Squadron (819 NAS), also known as 819 Squadron, is an inactive Fleet Air Arm (FAA) naval air squadron of the United Kingdom's Royal Navy (RN). It most recently operated Westland Sea King HAS.1/2/5/6 anti-submarine warfare helicopter between February 1971 and November 2001, based at RNAS Prestwick (HMS Gannet), South Ayrshire in Scotland where it also operated a Search and Rescue Flight.

Established in January 1940, at HMS Peregrine, the Royal Naval Air Station at Ford, the squadron was sent to Coastal Command to protect the Dunkirk evacuation. In June 1940, the squadron joined HMS Illustrious, serving in the North Atlantic before moving to the Mediterranean Fleet in August and participated in the Taranto attack in November. After HMS Illustrious was severely damaged in January 1941, the squadron was disbanded.

Reformed at HMS Daedalus, RNAS Lee-on-Solent, in October, the squadron was again assigned to Coastal Command, later. In April 1943 it embarked in HMS Archer and provided anti-submarine protection for North Atlantic convoys. It became the first squadron to sink a U-boat using rockets. The squadron later boarded the escort carrier HMS Activity, destroying another U-boat during an Arctic convoy. It then operated from east coast airfields before the Normandy landings, later moving to Belgium, but returned to the UK and disbanded in March 1945.

In October 1961, the squadron was reformed at HMS Gannet, RNAS Eglinton, serving as the ASW Wessex headquarters squadron. The squadron participated in many exercises with the Joint Anti-Submarine School. The helicopters were used on RFAs and NATO ships until the squadron was disbanded in January 1971.

The following month, the squadron reformed at HMS Seahawk, RNAS Culdrose. In October, it moved to Prestwick Airport to support submarines based in Clyde and participate in exercises. Here the squadron began offering unofficial search and rescue support for the southwest of Scotland. This became official in April 1975. An autonomous SAR Flight was established in July 1989 and in 2000, it was the busiest search and rescue unit in the UK. However, from mid-2001, the squadron decreased in size and disbanded in November, leaving behind a two-aircraft unit called HMS Gannet Search and Rescue Flight, which operated from Prestwick.

== History ==
=== Torpedo, Spotter, Reconnaissance squadron (1940-1941) ===
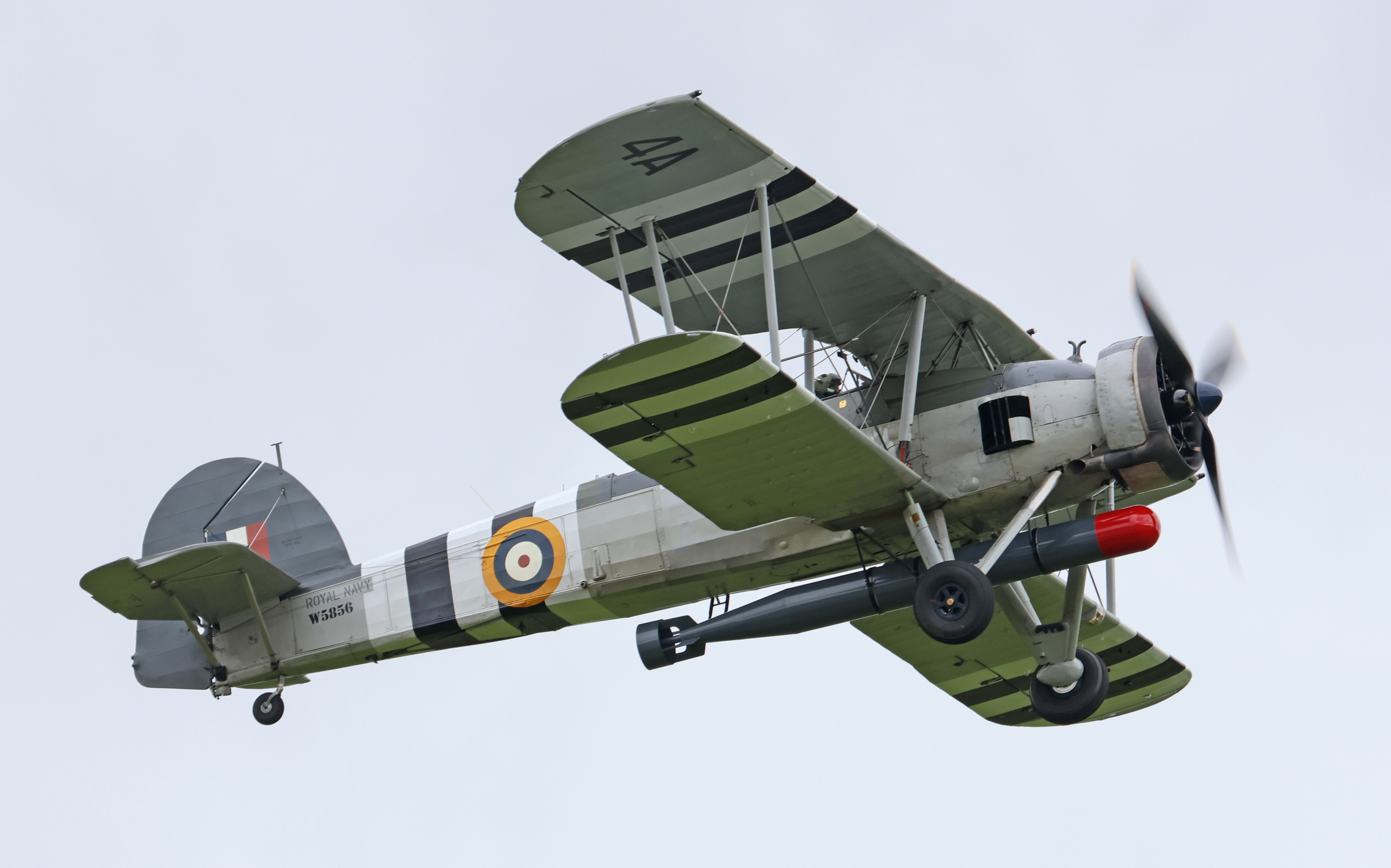
Fairey Swordfish I; an example of the type used by 819 NAS

819 Naval Air Squadron was established on 15 January 1940, at RNAS Ford (HMS Peregrine), Sussex, England, functioning as a Torpedo Strike Reconnaissance (TSR) squadron. The formation consisted of crews from HMS Ark Royal and HMS Glorious and was equipped with twelve Fairey Swordfish biplane torpedo bombers.

A segment of the squadron was assigned to RAF Detling, Kent, in May to conduct operations aimed at locating U-boats along the occupied Belgian coastline. Subsequently, in the following month, the entire squadron embarked in the name ship of her class, HMS Illustrious, for missions in the North Atlantic, with further training activities taking place in Bermuda.

In August the ship joined the Mediterranean Fleet and 819 Naval Air Squadron frequently alternated between the carrier and RNAS Dekheila (HMS Grebe), Egypt, which served as a shore base. During this period, the unit was significantly engaged in conducting assaults on harbors and airfields located in the Eastern Mediterranean.

The subsequent event involved engagement in the effective night attack on the battle fleet of the Regia Marina in the harbour of Taranto on the night of 11 November, during which significant damage was dealt to both coastal installations and naval vessels, culminating in the sinking of the Italian battleship Conte di Cavour.

On 10 January 1941, when HMS Illustrious was subjected to an attack that resulted in significant damage, the squadron experienced substantial losses in personnel and aircraft. The aircraft that were airborne at the time proceeded to RAF Hal Far, Malta, leading to the disbandment of the squadron into 815 Naval Air Squadron on 14 January.

=== Torpedo, Bomber, Reconnaissance squadron (1941-1945) ===
819 Naval Air Squadron was reestablished at RNAS Lee-on-Solent (HMS Daedalus), Hampshire, on 1 October 1941, equipped with nine Fairey Swordfish I aircraft, serving as a torpedo bomber reconnaissance squadron.

Following the completion of shore-based preparations and a partial re-equipment with Fairey Swordfish II aircraft, the unit embarked on the name ship of her class of escort carrier, HMS Avenger, for trials in June 1942. In the subsequent month, the squadron was temporarily assigned to the RAF Coastal Command, where it conducted three months of night operations, which included mine-laying missions in the North Sea and subsequently in the English Channel.

The squadron relocated to RNAS Machrihanish (HMS Landrail), Argyll and Bute, Scotland, on 16 April, prior to its embarkation in the escort carrier, HMS Archer, where it offered anti-submarine protection for convoys traversing the North Atlantic. Notably, on 23 May, Fairey Swordfish 'B', piloted by Sub-Lieutenant H. Horrocks of the Royal Naval Volunteer Reserve, with observer Sub-Lieutenant W. W. N. Balkwill, also of the RNVR, and Leading Airman J. W. Wick serving as the telegraphist air gunner, successfully executed a rocket assault that resulted in the sinking of the German submarine U-752. This event marked the first instance of a U-boat being sunk solely by a rocket attack and was only the second occasion in which an aircraft operating from an escort carrier achieved the destruction of a U-boat.

In August 1943, the squadron received three Grumman Martlet fighter aircraft from 892 Naval Air Squadron and subsequently embarked on the escort carrier HMS Activity to undertake additional escort operations. As the vessel participated in Russian convoys, additional Grumman Wildcat fighter aircraft were incorporated to provide defense against bombers originating from Norway. This strategy proved effective in April 1944, when the squadron successfully claimed four enemy aircraft. Notably, on 3 April, aircraft 'C', in conjunction with Grumman Avenger torpedo bombers from 846 Naval Air Squadron, was credited with the destruction of the German submarine U-288.

Following this, the Grumman Wildcats were reassigned to establish 833 Naval Air Squadron, while the Fairey Swordfish were stationed on land under RAF Coastal Command, conducting operations from airfields along the east coast in the lead-up to the Normandy landings. Subsequently, some flights were deployed to airfields in Belgium. Upon their return to the United Kingdom, the squadron was disbanded at RAF Bircham Newton, Norfolk, on 10 March 1945.

=== Wessex anti-submarine headquarters (1961-1971) ===
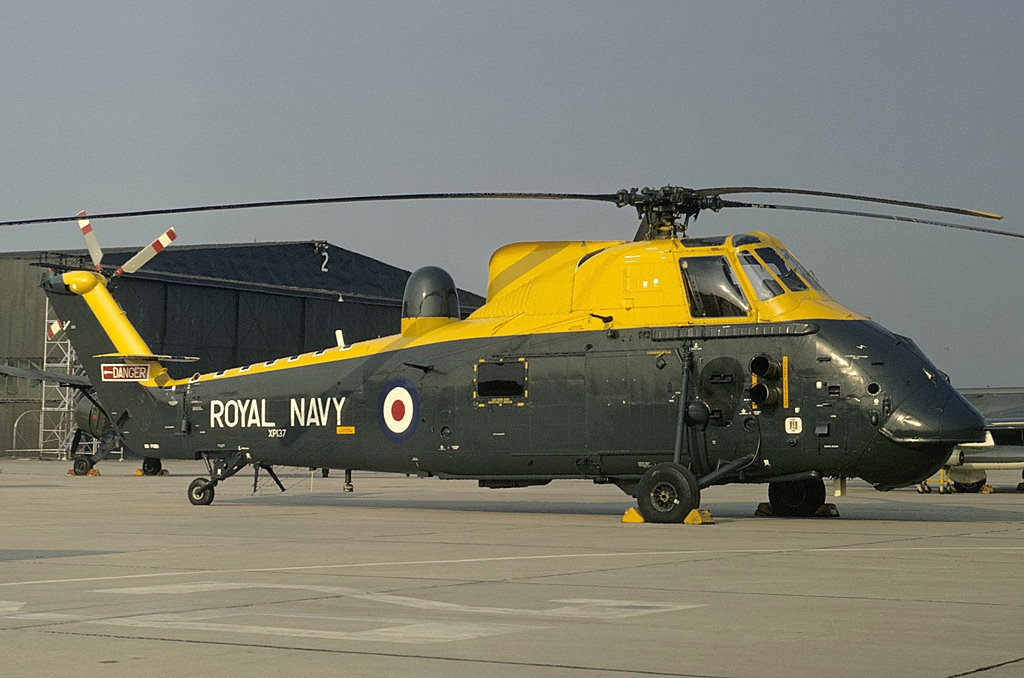
Westland Wessex HAS3; an example of the type used by 819 NAS

719 Naval Air Squadron was awarded first line status on 5 October 1961, and subsequently re-designated as 819 Naval Air Squadron. Initially, the squadron was equipped with one Westland Whirlwind HAS.7 anti-submarine helicopter and a number of Westland Wessex HAS.1 helicopters, which represented the initial variant for anti-submarine warfare. This configuration allowed the squadron to function as the headquarters unit for ASW operations involving the Wessex helicopters.

Upon the closure of RNAS Eglinton (HMS Gannet), County Londonderry, Northern Ireland, in February 1963, the squadron relocated 8 miles (13 km) eastward along the estuary to RNAS Ballykelly (HMS Sealion), County Londonderry. A variety of exercises were conducted in collaboration with the Joint Anti-Submarine School located in Londonderry, during which helicopters were periodically deployed from Royal Fleet Auxiliaries (RFAs) and NATO carriers, including the United States Navy's USS Essex, the Royal Netherlands Navy's Colossus-class aircraft carrier, HNLMS Karel Doorman, and the Royal Navy's Centaur-class light fleet carriers, HMS Centaur. The Westland Wessex HAS.1 helicopters were subsequently replaced by HAS.3 variants in April 1968. The squadron's aircraft continued to be deployed on RFAs until the unit was officially disbanded on 29 January 1971.

=== Sea King (1971-2001) ===
819 Naval Air Squadron was reestablished on 9 February 1971, at RNAS Culdrose (HMS Seahawk), Cornwall, becoming the third operational unit equipped with the Westland Sea King HAS.1 anti-submarine helicopter. The squadron relocated to Prestwick Airport, with the Royal Navy shore establishment known as RNAS Prestwick (HMS Gannet) on 27 October 1971, following the completion of new facilities designed to accommodate its operations.

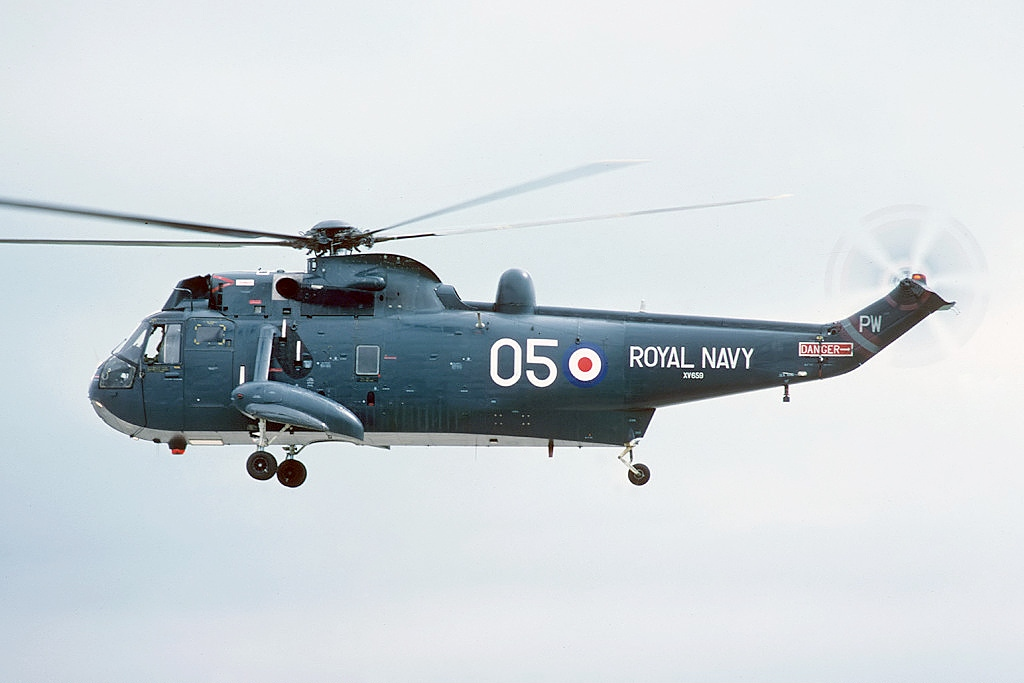
Westland Sea King HAS2A, 819 Naval Air Squadron, RNAS Prestwick

In December 1977, the squadron was augmented with the addition of Westland Sea King HAS.2 helicopters, which progressively expanded its fleet to a total of nine helicopters. Beginning in early 1985, the squadron initiated a transition to Westland Sea King HAS.5 helicopters, and by April 1989, it had integrated several HAS.6 variants into its operations, and in addition, the last two aircraft from 824 Naval Air Squadron which were designated for a Trials Flight, in August 1989.

On 30 July 1993, Flights 'A', 'B', 'C', and 'D' were reassigned from 826 Naval Air Squadron. Each Flight comprised a single helicopter, accompanied by both air and ground personnel, and was prepared to function autonomously from Type 22 Frigates or Royal Fleet Auxiliaries (RFAs). However, the utilisation of Prestwick as a shore base proved to be unsuccessful, leading to the transfer of the flights to 810 Naval Air Squadron at RNAS Culdrose in November 1994.

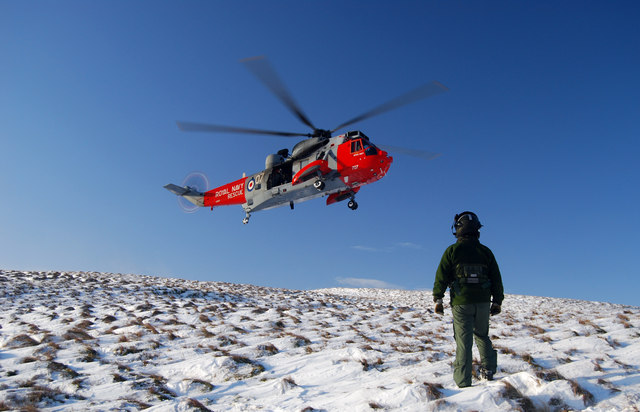
Royal Navy SAR Helicopter on Big Torry, Ochil Hills

When the squadron arrived in Prestwick, it began an unofficial Search and Rescue (SAR) operation for southwestern Scotland. This was made official in April 1975, with a helicopter ready to respond within 90 minutes, day or night.

In July 1989, the response times improved to 15 minutes during the day and 45 minutes at night, as an independent SAR Flight was formed. By 2000, 819 Naval Air Squadron became the busiest SAR unit in the UK. However, from mid-2001, the squadron became smaller and was disbanded in November.

The SAR flight transitioned into HMS Gannet Search and Rescue Flight, operating the Westland Sea King HU5 utility helicopter.

== Aircraft flown ==
The squadron operated a variety of different aircraft and versions:

- Fairey Swordfish I torpedo bomber (January 1940 - January 1941, October 1941 - June 1943)
- Fairey Swordfish II torpedo bomber (April 1942 - March 1945)
- Grumman Martlet Mk IV fighter aircraft (August 1943 - April 1944)
- Grumman Wildcat Mk V fighter aircraft (March - April 1944)
- Grumman Wildcat Mk VI fighter aircraft (March - April 1944)
- Fairey Swordfish III torpedo bomber (August 1944 - March 1945)
- Westland Whirlwind HAS.7 anti-submarine warfare helicopter (October 1961 - July 1962)
- Westland Wessex HAS.1 anti-submarine warfare helicopter (October 1961 - March 1968)
- Westland Wessex HAS.3 anti-submarine warfare helicopter (April 1968 - January 1971)
- Westland Sea King HAS.1 anti-submarine warfare helicopter (February 1971 - July 1978)
- Westland Sea King HAS.2 anti-submarine warfare helicopter (December 1977 - December 1985)
- Westland Sea King HAS.5 anti-submarine warfare helicopter (February 1985 - November 2001)
- Westland Sea King HAS.6 anti-submarine warfare helicopter (April 1989 - November 2001)

== Battle honours ==
The following Battle Honours have been awarded to 819 Naval Air Squadron:

- Mediterranean 1940-41
- Libya 1940
- Taranto 1940
- English Channel 1942-44
- Atlantic 1943-44
- Arctic 1944
- Normandy 1944

== Naval air stations and aircraft carriers ==
819 Naval Air Squadron was active at various naval air stations of the Royal Navy and Royal Air Force stations, both within the United Kingdom and internationally. Additionally, it operated from several Royal Navy fleet carriers and escort carriers, as well as other airbases located abroad.

=== World War Two air stations and aircraft carriers ===
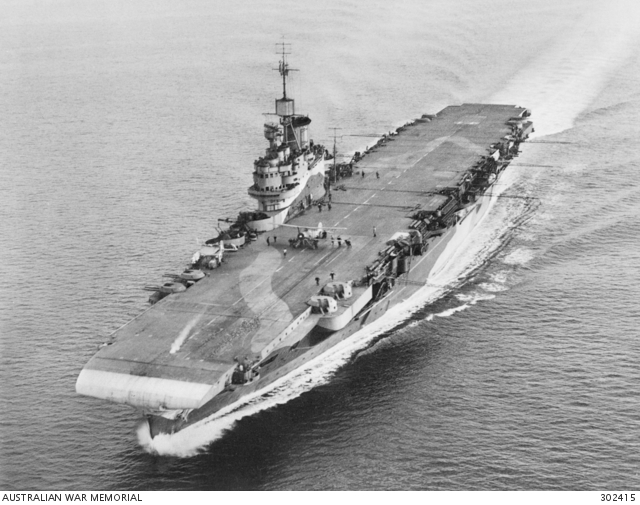
HMS Illustrious

List of air stations and aircraft carriers used by 819 Naval Air Squadron during World War two including dates:

1940 - 1941

- Royal Naval Air Station Ford (HMS Peregrine), West Sussex, (15 January - 9 March 1940)
- Royal Air Force West Freugh, No. 4 Bombing and Gunnery School RAF, Dumfries and Galloway, (9 - 30 March 1940)
- Royal Naval Air Station Ford (HMS Peregrine), West Sussex, (30 March - 27 May 1940)
  - Royal Air Force Detling, Kent, (Detachment six aircraft 21 - 23 May 1940)
- Royal Naval Air Station Roborough, Devon, (27 May - 11 June 1940)
- HMS Illustrious (11 - 28 June 1940)
  - Royal Naval Air Station Roborough, Devon, (Detachment seven aircraft 16 - 21 June 1940)
- Royal Naval Air Station Bermuda, Bermuda, (28 June - 23 July 1940)
- Royal Naval Air Station Abbotsinch (HMS Sanderling), Renfrewshire, (23 July - 11 August 1940)
- HMS Illustrious (11 August - 18 September 1940)
- Royal Naval Air Station Dekheila (HMS Grebe), Alexandria, Egypt, (18 - 29 September 1940)
- HMS Illustrious (29 September - 3 October 1940)
- Royal Naval Air Station Dekheila (HMS Grebe), Alexandria, Egypt, (3 - 5 October 1940)
- HMS Illustrious (5 - 24 October 1940)
  - Fuka Aerodrome, Egypt, (satellite 22 October 1940)
- Royal Naval Air Station Dekheila (HMS Grebe), Alexandria, Egypt, (24 - 29 October 1940)
- HMS Illustrious (29 October - 14 November 1940)
- Royal Naval Air Station Dekheila (HMS Grebe), Alexandria, Egypt, (14 - 25 November 1940)
- HMS Illustrious (25 - 30 November 1940)
  - Heraklion Air Base, Crete, (Detachment six aircraft 29 November - 6 December 1940)
- Royal Naval Air Station Dekheila (HMS Grebe), Alexandria, Egypt, (30 November - 10 December 1940)
- HMS Illustrious (10 December 1940 - 10 January 1941)
- Royal Naval Air Station Hal Far, Malta, (10 - 14 January 1941)
- disbanded - (14 January 1941)

1941 - 1945

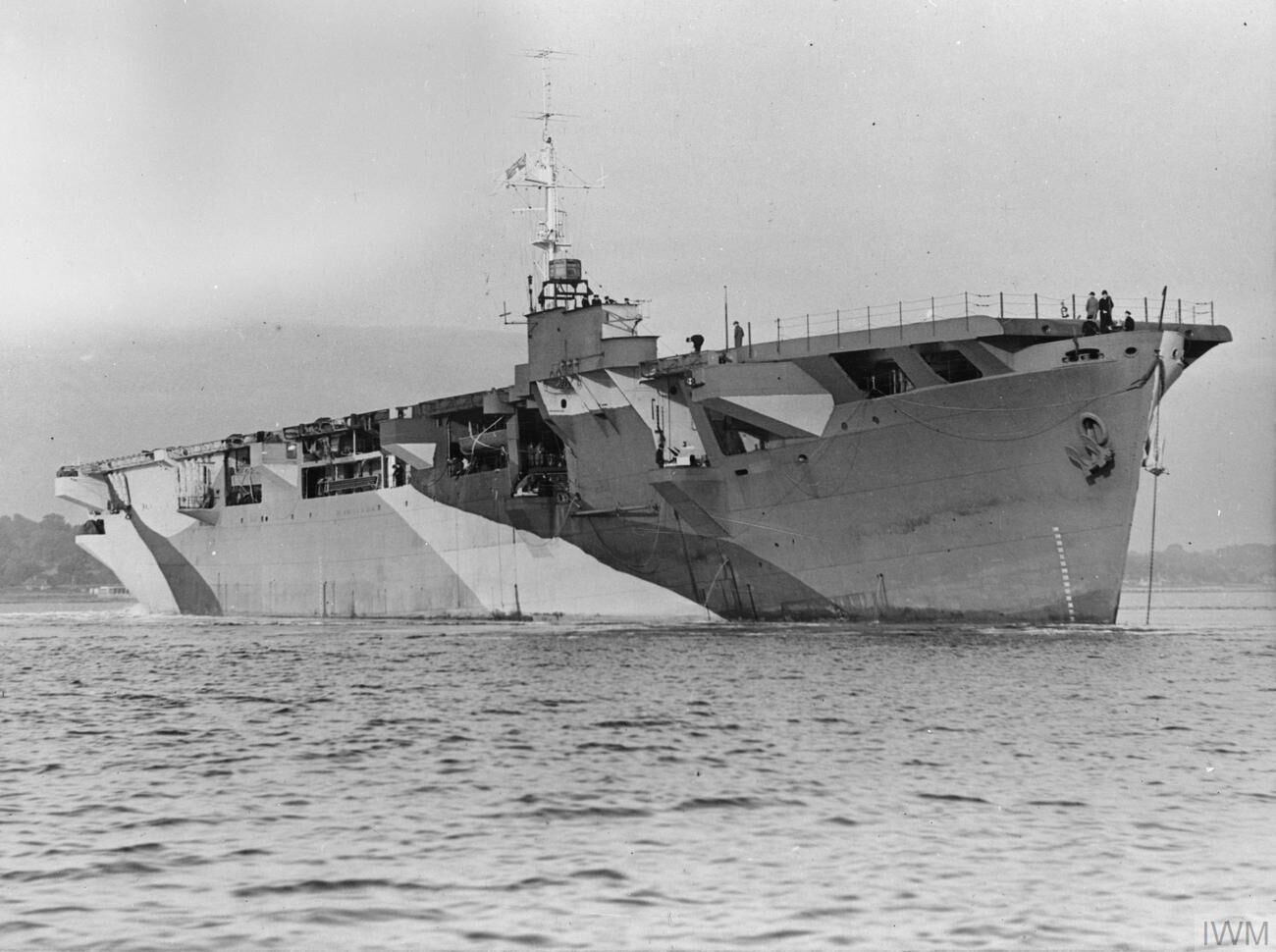
HMS Activity

- Royal Naval Air Station Lee-on-Solent (HMS Daedalus), Hampshire, (1 October - 8 December 1941)
- Royal Naval Air Station Crail (HMS Jackdaw), Fife, (8 December 1941 - 27 January 1942)
- Royal Naval Air Station Twatt (HMS Tern), Mainland, Orkney, (27 January - 22 February 1942)
- Royal Naval Air Station Hatston (HMS Sparrowhawk), Mainland, Orkney, (22 February - 26 March 1942)
- Royal Naval Air Station Donibristle (HMS Merlin), Fife, (26 March - 16 April 1942)
- Royal Naval Air Station Machrihanish (HMS Landrail), Argyll and Bute, (16 April - 8 June 1942)
- HMS Avenger (8 June - 13 July 1942)
- Royal Naval Air Station Machrihanish (HMS Landrail), Argyll and Bute, (13 - 17 July 1942)
- Royal Air Force Langham (16 Gp), Norfolk, (17 July - 6 August 1942)
- Royal Air Force Bircham Newton (16 Gp), Norfolk, (6 August - 23 September 1942)
- Royal Air Force Thorney Island, West Sussex, (23 September - 28 October 1942)
- Royal Naval Air Station Hatston (HMS Sparrowhawk), Mainland, Orkney, (28 October - 16 December 1942)
- Royal Naval Air Station Fearn (HMS Owl), Scottish Highlands, (16 December 1942 - 21 January 1943)
- Royal Naval Air Station Machrihanish (HMS Landrail), Argyll and Bute, (21 January - 28 February 1943)
- HMS Archer (28 February - 8 April 1943)
- Royal Naval Air Station Machrihanish (HMS Landrail), Argyll and Bute, (8 - 9 April 1943)
- Royal Air Force Ballykelly, County Londonderry, (9 - 24 April 1943)
- HMS Archer (24 April - 25 May 1943)
  - Royal Naval Air Station Machrihanish (HMS Landrail), Argyll and Bute, (Detachment four aircraft 24 - 27 April 1943)
- Royal Naval Air Station Machrihanish (HMS Landrail), Argyll and Bute, (25 - 27 May 1943)
- Royal Naval Air Station Abbotsinch (HMS Sanderling), Renfrewshire, (27 May - 10 June 1943)
- Royal Air Force Ballykelly, County Londonderry, (10 - 11 June 1943)
- Royal Naval Air Station Abbotsinch (HMS Sanderling), Renfrewshire, (11 - 15 June 1943)
- HMS Archer (15 June - 1 August 1943)
- Royal Naval Air Station St Merryn (HMS Vulture), Cornwall, (1 - 2 August 1943)
- HMS Archer (2 -6 August 1943)
- Royal Naval Air Station Machrihanish (HMS Landrail), Argyll and Bute, (6 - 10 August 1943)
- Royal Naval Air Station Maydown, County Londonderry, (10 - 22 August 1943)
  - Royal Naval Air Station Ayr (HMS Wagtail), South Ayrshire, (Detachment four aircraft 18 - 22 August 1943)
- Royal Naval Air Station Eglinton (HMS Gannet), County Londonderry, (22 - 30 August 1943)
- HMS Activity (30 August - 27 September 1943)
- Royal Naval Air Station Inskip (HMS Nightjar), Lancashire, (27 September - 15 October 1943)
- Royal Naval Air Station Belfast (HMS Gadwall), County Antrim, (15 October 1943 - 12 January 1944)
- HMS Activity (12 January - 9 March 1944)
  - Royal Naval Air Station Donibristle (HMS Merlin), Fife, (Detachment three aircraft 21 February - 25 March 1944)
- Royal Naval Air Station Machrihanish (HMS Landrail), Argyll and Bute, (9 - 25 March 1944)
- HMS Activity (25 March - 13 April 1944)
- Royal Naval Air Station Hatston (HMS Sparrowhawk), Mainland, Orkney, (13 - 20 April 1944)
- HMS Activity Fighter Flight (17 April 1944, transferred to 833 Naval Air Squadron 23 April 1944)
- Royal Air Force Manston (155 Wing), Kent, (20 April - 1 August 1944)
- Royal Air Force Limavady, County Londonderry, (1 - 2 August 1944)
- Royal Naval Air Station Lee-on-Solent (HMS Daedalus), Hampshire, (2 -8 August 1944)
- Royal Air Force Swingfield (16 Gp), Kent, (8 August - 1 October 1944)
- Royal Air Force Bircham Newton, Norfolk, (1 October 1944 - 15 January 1945)
  - Detached Flight with six aircraft:
    - B.63 St Croix, Belgium, (29 October 1944)
    - B.65 Maldeghem, Belgium, (11 November 1944)
    - B.83 Knocke-le-Zoute, Belgium, (14 December 1944)
- B.83 Knocke-le-Zoute, Belgium, (15 January 1945)
- Royal Air Force Bircham Newton, Norfolk, (26 February - 10 March 1945)
- disbanded - (10 March 1945)

== Commanding officers ==
List of commanding officers of 819 Naval Air Squadron with date of appointment:

1940 - 1941

- Lieutenant Commander J.W. Hale, DSO, RN, from 12 February 1940
- disbanded - 14 January 1941

1941 - 1945

- Lieutenant Commander D.G. Goodwin, DSC, RN, from 25 October 1941
- Lieutenant H.S.McN. Davenport, RN, from 10 April 1942
- Lieutenant(A) O.A.G. Oxley, RN, from 23 January 1943
- Lieutenant Commander(A) P.D.T. Stevens, RNVR, from 20 April 1944
- disbanded - 10 March 1945

1961 - 1971

- Lieutenant Commander J.R.T. Bluett, RN, from 5 October 1961
- Lieutenant Commander P.J. Lynn, RN, from 7 September 1962
- Lieutenant Commander P. Burton, RN, from 26 August 1964
- Lieutenant Commander A.G. Claridge, RN, from 9 February 1966
- Lieutenant Commander P.H.G. Rogers, RN, from 1 June 1967
- Lieutenant Commander D.B. Bathurst, RN, from 7 February 1969
- Lieutenant Commander D.W. Shrubb, RN, from 27 October 1969
- disbanded - 29 January 1971

1971 - 2001

- Lieutenant Commander D.W. Shrubb, RN, from 9 February 1971
- Lieutenant Commander J.D.W. Husband, RN, from 12 November 1971
- Lieutenant Commander D.T. Ancona, RN, from 28 February 1973
- Lieutenant Commander M. Hope, RN, from 9 October 1974
- Lieutenant Commander M. Maddox, RN, from 15 October 1976
- Lieutenant Commander A.F. Hutchinson, RN, from 10 March 1978
- Lieutenant Commander A. Finnes, RN, from 8 January 1980
- Lieutenant Commander P.F. Southon, RN, from 1 July 1981
- Lieutenant Commander M.J. Priestley, RN, from 14 April 1983
- Lieutenant Commander J.J. Carter, RN, from 3 April 1985
- Lieutenant Commander C.J. Denny, RN, from 20 March 1987
- Lieutenant Commander I.G. Milne, RN, from 1 November 1989
- Lieutenant Commander C.A. Sutton, RN, from 18 June 1991
- Lieutenant Commander C. Riley, RN, from 3 July 1993
- Lieutenant Commander D.M. Searle, RN, from 2 June 1994
- Lieutenant Commander R.S. Alexander, RN, from 2 February 1997
- Lieutenant Commander R.A. Cunningham, MBE, RN, from 14 May 1999 (Commodore 30 June 2000)
- Lieutenant Commander A.P. Watts, RN, from 27 September 2000
- disbanded - 19 November 2001

Note: Abbreviation (A) signifies Air Branch of the RN or RNVR.

== See also ==
- History of Royal Navy Helicopter Search and Rescue
- Outline of the British Royal Navy at the end of the Cold War
