= Royal Navy SAR 60 =

60th anniversary of Royal Navy Helicopter Search and Rescue
- RN SAR 60 Logo
- Date: 2013
- Also known as: RN SAR 60
- Website: Royal Navy SAR 60

Royal Navy Search and Rescue 60 was a series of events throughout 2013 to mark the 60th anniversary of the creation of the first helicopter unit within the Royal Navy with a search and rescue role.

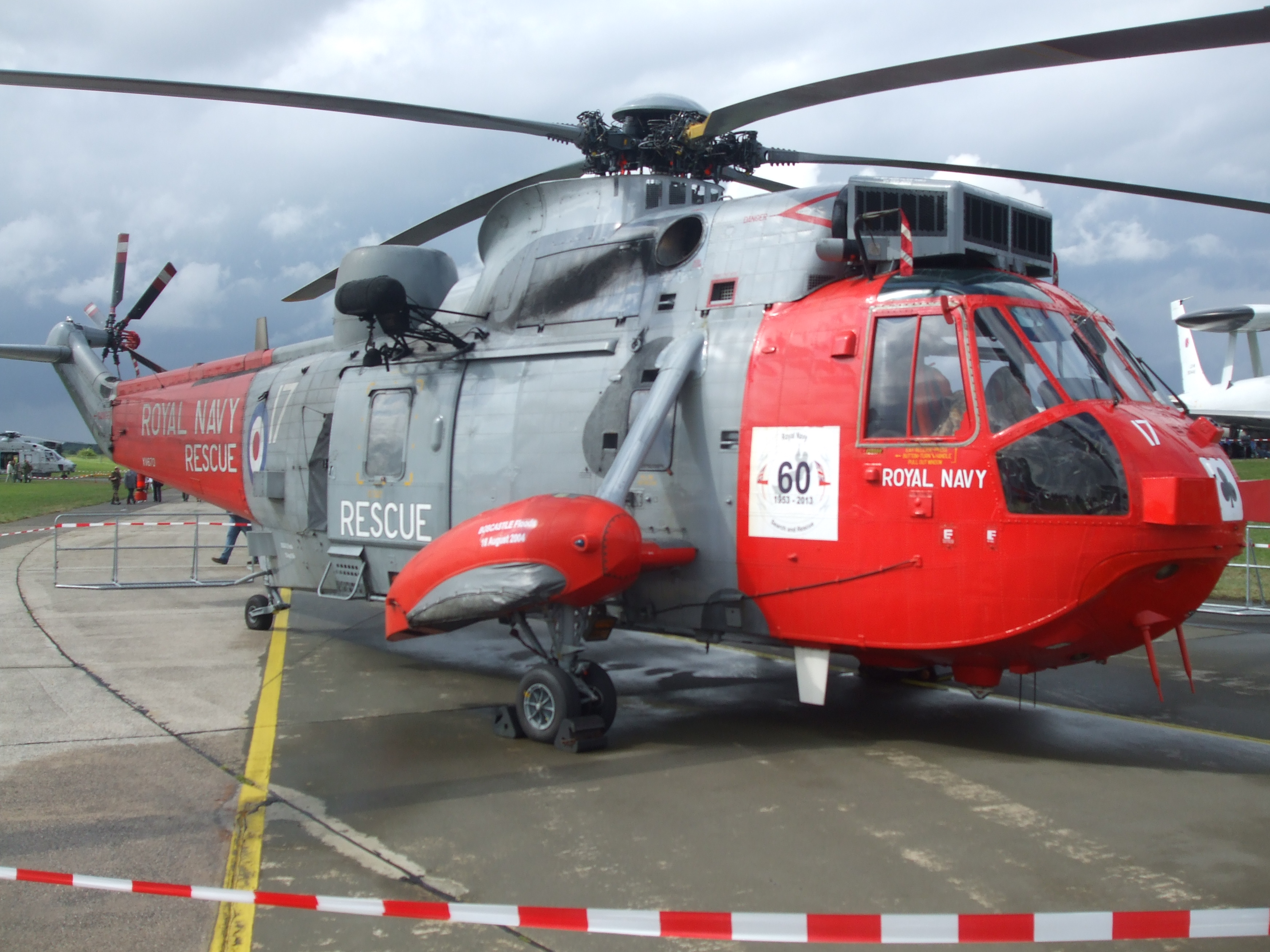
Sea King HAR.5 XV670, Nordholz, 2013

Events started on 12 January with the launch of RN SAR 60 by Commander Sea King, Commander Finn, at the London Boat Show. A Westland Sea King HAR.5 rescue helicopter and crew from 771 Naval Air Squadron flew up from their home station of RNAS Culdrose (HMS Seahawk) in Cornwall to perform rescue demonstrations in the Royal Victoria Dock, outside the ExCel Centre, on both days of the first weekend of the Show. More members of 771 NAS and their sister unit, Gannet SAR Flight from Prestwick in Scotland, manned a Royal Navy stand for the duration of the Show.

Many more events were held throughout 2013 with the main event being the SAR themed 2013 RNAS Culdrose Air Day.

== Charity ==
Members of the Royal Navy Search and Rescue Force pledged to raise £60,000 for charity throughout the year. This was done in all manner of ways with the money being split between The Royal Navy and Royal Marines Charity, CLIC Sargent, and Children's Hospice South West.

== See also ==
- History of Royal Navy Helicopter Search and Rescue
