= MV Secil Japan =

Japanese built, Panamanian registered cargo ship

History
- Name: Secil Japan
- Owner: Eternal Line S. A., Panama City
- Builder: Imai Seisakusho Co. Ltd, Iwagi
- Yard number: 222
- In service: 1982
- Out of service: 1989
- Identification: IMO number: 8210091
- Fate: Ran aground

General characteristics
- Tonnage: 2,625 GT
- Length: 90.5 m (296 ft 11 in)
- Beam: 15.2 m (49 ft 10 in)
- Draught: 7.6 m (24 ft 11 in)
- Speed: 11 knots
- Crew: 16

MV Secil Japan was a Panamanian cargo ship that was built in Japan and launched in 1982. She was wrecked on 12 March 1989 at Hell's Mouth, Cornwall, United Kingdom. Today little of the ship survives, although some remains can be seen at low tide.

== Loss ==
Having made calls at Aveiro and Leixões, Portugal, Secil Japan was bound for Liverpool carrying timber. While passing the north coast of Cornwall in strong gales, the ship's cargo shifted and an attempt was made to make refuge at Godrevy Point. However, when the anchor was unable to hold and the engines failed to start, Secil Japan was pushed towards Hell's Mouth.

A Royal Navy SAR helicopter from RNAS Culdrose and a SAR helicopter from RAF Brawdy were called out to assist, with the latter arriving at 00:30am on 13 March, by which time the ship was aground, with waves submerging and breaking over it. Of the sixteen crew members, who had all sought refuge in the wheelhouse, fifteen were successfully winched to safety. One fatality occurred when the crew member slipped from the strop while being winched and was drowned. The ship soon broke into three, while the crews of both rescue helicopters were later awarded the Edward and Maisie Lewis Award by the Shipwrecked Mariners' Society for their bravery and efforts.
