= HMS Gannet (1971 shore establishment) =

Royal Navy forward operating base in South Ayrshire, Scotland

HMS Gannet
- Glasgow Prestwick Airport
- Prestwick, South Ayrshire in Scotland
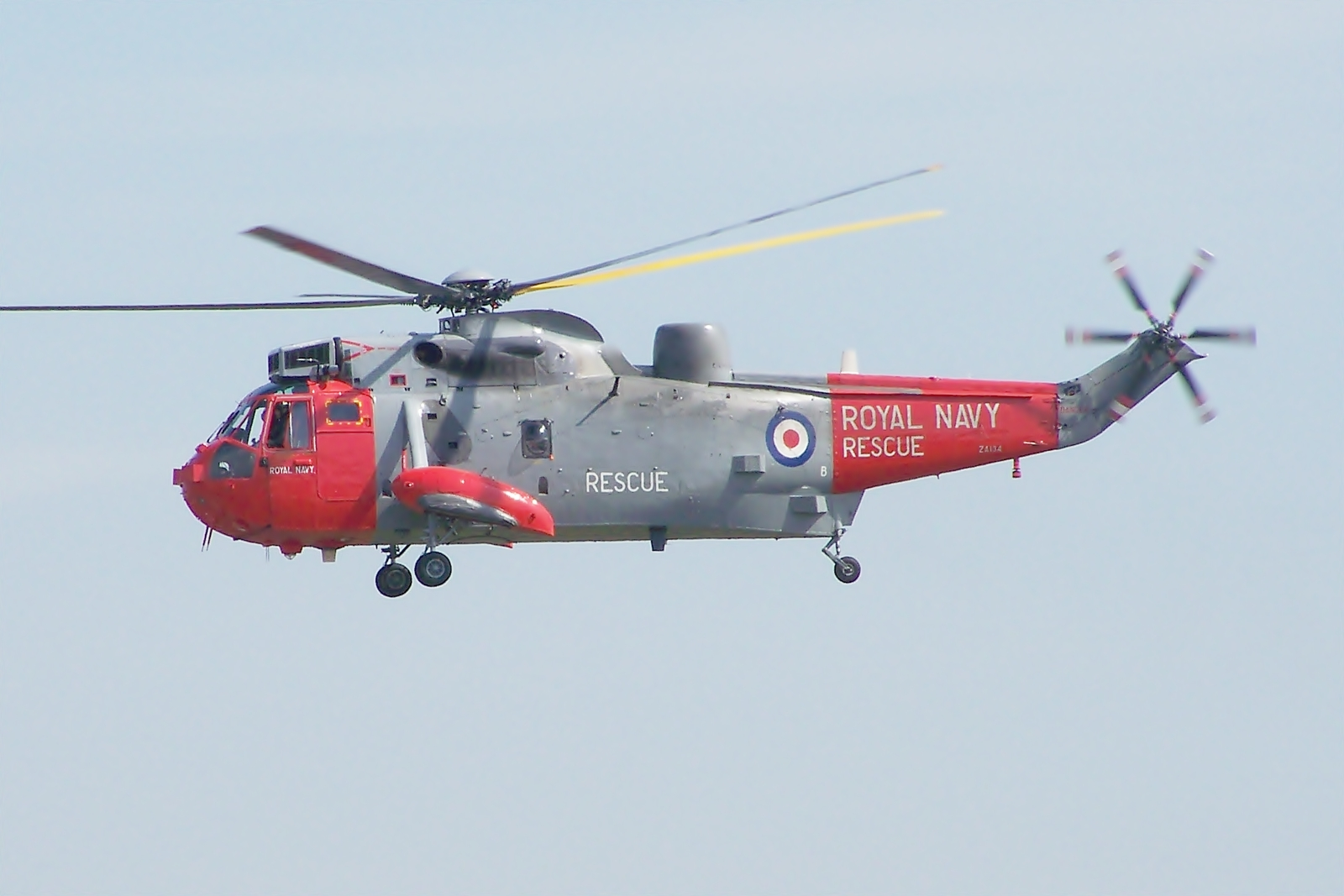
- A Royal Navy Westland Sea King of the HMS Gannet Search and Rescue Flight during 2012

Site information
- Type: Forward Operating Base (FOB)
- Owner: Ministry of Defence
- Operator: Royal Navy
- Controlled by: Fleet Air Arm
- Condition: Operational

Location
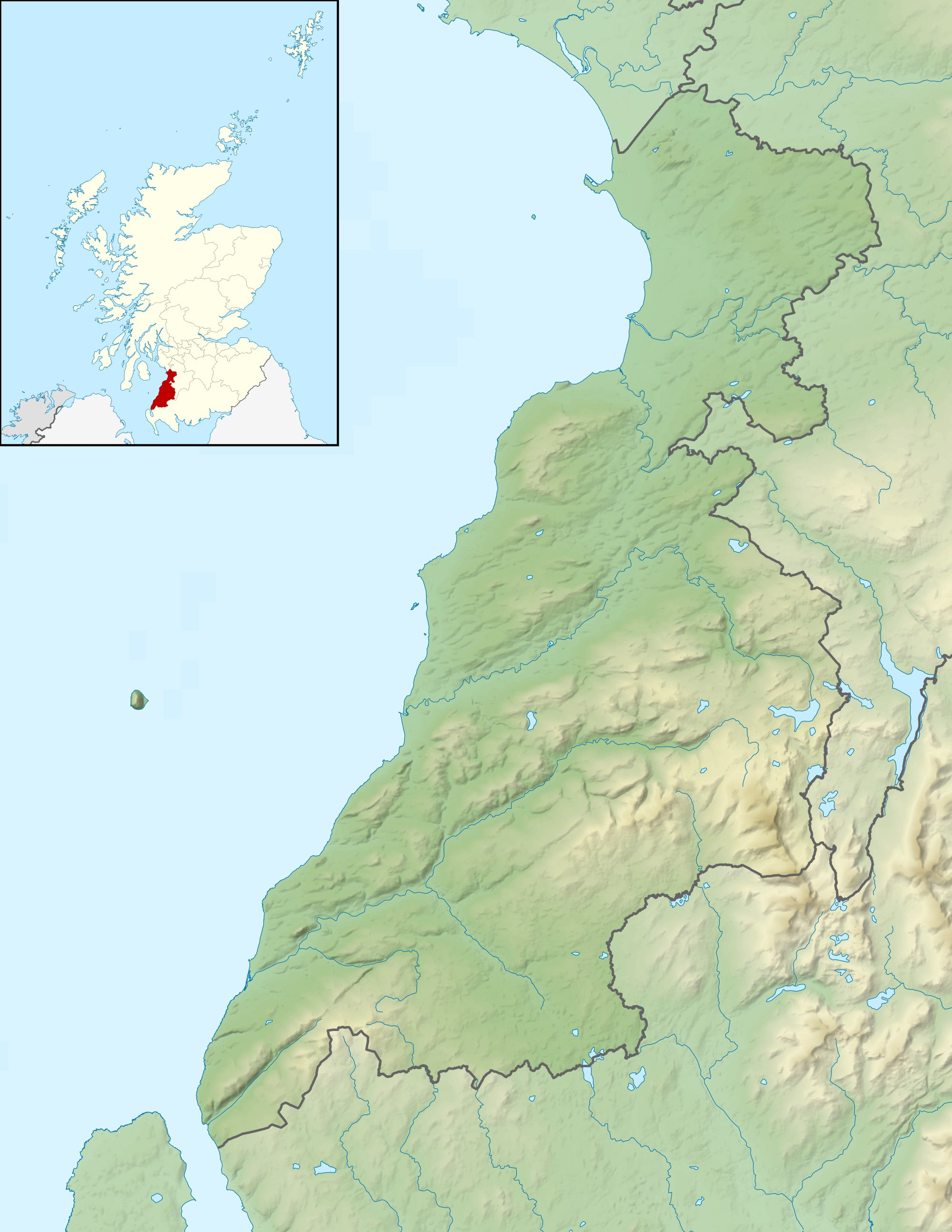
- Location in South Ayrshire HMS Gannet (the United Kingdom)
- Coordinates: 55°30′53.7″N 4°34′58.5″W

Site history
- Built: 1971
- In use: 1971 – 2002 (Royal Naval Air Station); 2002 – present (FOB)

Airfield information
- Identifiers: IATA: PIK, ICAO: EGPK, WMO: 031350
- Elevation: 19.9 metres (65 ft) AMSL
Runways
Direction	Length and surface
12/30	2,986 metres (9,797 ft) Concrete/Asphalt
03/21	1,905 metres (6,250 ft) Asphalt
- Airfield shared with Prestwick Airport; Source: UK AIP at NATS

HMS Gannet is a forward operating base (FOB) of the Royal Navy's Fleet Air Arm located at Glasgow Prestwick Airport, South Ayrshire in Scotland.

The facility was previously also known as Royal Naval Air Station (RNAS) Prestwick before it was downsized in 2001. It hosted the only Fleet Air Arm Search and Rescue (SAR) Flight in Scotland, HMS Gannet SAR Flight. The SAR Flight was decommissioned in March 2016, leaving the base to operate as a forward operating base and support to UK military.

== History ==
=== Establishment ===
The ninth and present HMS Gannet was established in 1971 at Prestwick Airport in Ayrshire. Over the years Prestwick has hosted three Naval Air Squadrons: 814 NAS, 824 NAS and 819 NAS. 819 NAS operated three flights (A, B and Search and Rescue Flight) as well as a headquarters element. A and B Flights traditionally served aboard both UK and allied support ships and deployed on numerous exercises and longer deployments such as Naval Task Group 2000. When 819 NAS was decommissioned in November 2001, after 30 years in residence, the SAR Flight and 819 HQ elements became HMS Gannet Search and Rescue Flight with their first Commanding Officer, Lt Cdr A Watts.

RNAS Prestwick designation was added in January 1994.

=== HMS Gannet Search and Rescue Flight ===
The SAR flight was the last flight based at RNAS Prestwick.

It operated two from three Sea King HU5 helicopters in the military and civilian search and rescue role across Scotland, Northern England and Northern Ireland. The crews covered an area from Ben Nevis in the north, the Isle of Man and the Lake District to the south, east to Edinburgh, the Firth of Forth and the Borders, west to Northern Ireland and extended 200 miles (320 km) west of Ireland over the north Atlantic, giving an operational area of approx. 98,000 square miles.

Personnel at the base consisted of fifteen officers, eleven ratings, twenty-eight civil servants and fifty civilian staff. The primary role was one of military search and rescue, with secondary roles in civilian Search and Rescue. Gannet also provides an important medical evacuation service to the many island communities and remote areas of Scotland. To perform these roles, one of the helicopters was on 15-minutes notice to fly during the day, and 45-minutes during the night, with a duty crew on call for 24-hours. This duty was maintained for 365-days of the year, with a second standby aircraft ready to assist should the emergency demand it.

In 1998, Gannet was awarded the Wilkinson Sword of Peace for services to the local communities.

Consistently one of the busiest SAR units in the UK, 2009 saw the SAR Flight break a new record when they were tasked to 447 call outs. This figure equated to 20% of the UK’s total military SAR call outs in that year. In 2011, the Flight was the busiest SAR unit for the fifth year in succession. In 2010, with 379 call outs. and 2011 with 298 call-outs and 240 people rescued.

Some of the crew from HMS Gannet on TV's Highland Emergency

During 2008 to 2011, the SAR flight featured regularly on the Channel 5 documentary series Highland Emergency and BBC's Countryside Rescue. When SAR duties were carried out by 819 NAS, the SAR aircraft and aircrew were filmed as part of the BBC drama series Rockface and Two Thousand Acres of Sky.

In 2012, there were again 298 call-outs resulting in the rescue of 285 people.

In 2014, the flight was tasked to 299 call-outs. This number made them the second busiest in the UK. RAF Valley in Wales was the busiest with 329 jobs.

In 2015, the final year of dedicated military SAR in the UK, the flight was again the busiest SAR unit with 313 rescues, with its running total being higher at the time of the other units decommissioning earlier. It also won the Prince Philip Helicopter Rescue Award in 2015 and 2016.

As of 1 January 2016, at 9 am, they were replaced by civilians from Bristow Helicopters and HM Coastguard.

The flight was disbanded on 5 February 2016.

=== RN SAR 60 ===
As one of only two commissioned units of the ten that have operated within the Royal Navy in the dedicated search and rescue role, in 2013, Gannet SAR Flight was a core part of year-long celebrations to recognise 60 years of RN Helicopter Search and Rescue. Events took place throughout the country and media all year, with the RN SAR Force raising £60,000 for charity.

=== Transfer of SAR function to HM Coastguard ===
With effect from 1 January 2016, the SAR function which had been performed by the Gannet SAR Flight was transferred to Bristow Helicopters, acting on behalf of Her Majesty's Coastguard, part of the UK's Maritime and Coastguard Agency. The Coastguard are housed in a purpose-built hangar nearby. HMS Gannet's status was reviewed in 2015, with a strong case for "Defence of the Clyde" operations being relocated to Northern Ireland as proposed by DIO. A strong case was put forward defending Gannet including its existing infrastructure, better climate and access to the Clyde being led by the Commanding Officer at the time. It now remains open serving as a Forward Operating Base, primarily as in "Defence of the Clyde" and supporting various detachments and major exercises such as Joint Warrior. The Last Commanding Officer, Lt Cdr C E Fuller RN, was not replaced with the command and control element now being served from RNAS Culdrose in Cornwall and a small staff in situ to run day-to-day operations.

=== Units ===
A number of units were here at some point:

- Detachment No. 4 of 702 Naval Air Squadron
- Detachment No. 3 of 810 Naval Air Squadron
- Detachment No. 4 of 810 Naval Air Squadron
- 814 Naval Air Squadron
- Detachment No. 1 of 815 Naval Air Squadron
- 819 Naval Air Squadron
- 820 Naval Air Squadron
- 824 Naval Air Squadron
- 826 Naval Air Squadron
- Detachments of 845 Naval Air Squadron

== Role and operations ==
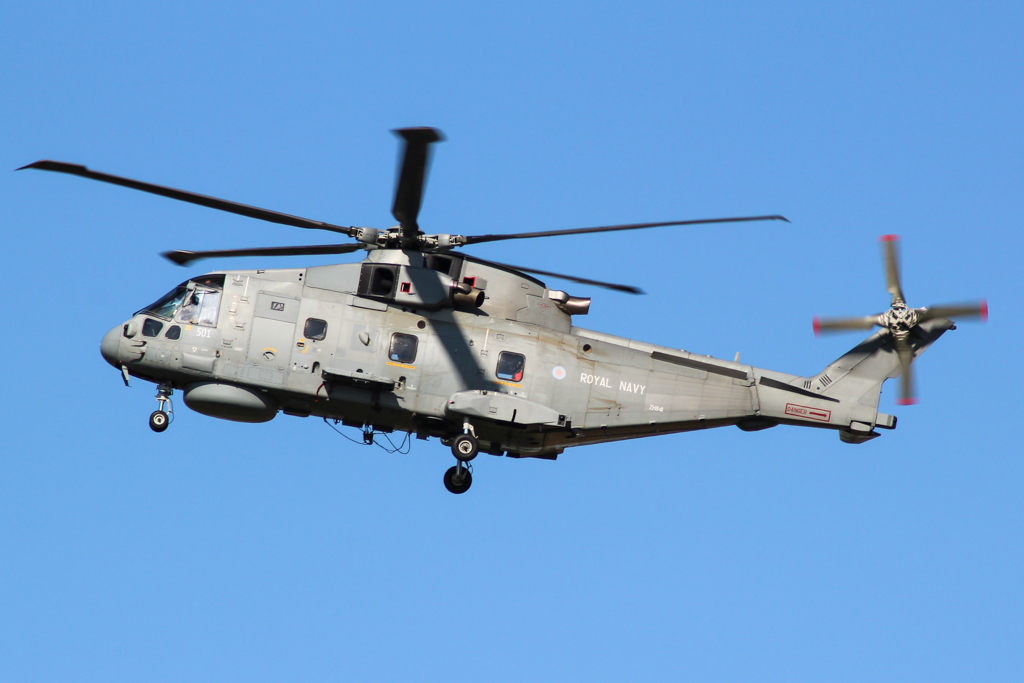
A Royal Navy Merlin HM2 landing at HMS Gannet during 2015

HMS Gannet is a forward operating base used by detachments of Royal Navy Merlin HM2 helicopters which are deployed from RNAS Culdrose as and when required. The anti-submarine warfare helicopters support the biannual Joint Warrior exercises and the Submarine Command Course, provide a helicopter capability to the navy's smaller vessels during operational sea training and offer protection to Vanguard-class nuclear-powered ballistic missile submarines as they arrive and depart their home port at Faslane.
