= HMS Eagle (R05) =

Royal Navy aircraft carrier

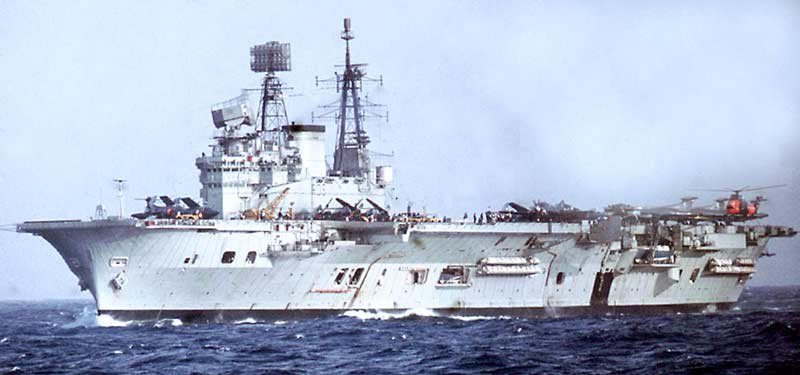
- HMS Eagle at flying stations in the Mediterranean, January 1970

History

United Kingdom
- Name: HMS Eagle
- Builder: Harland and Wolff
- Yard number: 1220
- Laid down: 24 October 1942
- Launched: 19 March 1946
- Completed: 1 October 1951
- Commissioned: 1 March 1952
- Decommissioned: 26 January 1972
- Home port: HMNB Devonport
- Identification: Pennant: R05
- Fate: Scrapped 1978

General characteristics
- Class & type: Audacious-class aircraft carrier
- Displacement: 36,800 long tons (37,391 t) standard (1951); 46,000 long tons (46,738 t) full load (1951); 43,060 long tons (43,751 t) standard (1957); 54,100 long tons (54,968 t) standard (1964)
- Length: 803 ft (245 m) (1951?); 720 ft (220 m) p.p. (1964); 720 ft (220 m) oa (1964)
- Beam: 135 ft (41 m) overall (1951?); 112.8 ft (34.4 m) hull (1964); 171 ft (52 m) overall width (1964)
- Draught: 33.25 ft (10.13 m) (1951); 36 ft (11 m) (1964)
- Propulsion: 4 shaft geared steam turbines; 8 boilers; 152,000 shp (113,000 kW)
- Speed: 31 knots (36 mph; 57 km/h)
- Range: 7,000 nmi (13,000 km) at 18 knots (21 mph; 33 km/h)
- Complement: 2,500 (average); 2,750 (max.)
- Armament: As built: 16 × 4.5 inch guns (8×2); 61 × 40 mm guns (8×6, 2×2, 9×1); Post-1964 refit: 8 × 4.5 inch guns (4×2); 6 × Seacat SAM missile launchers
- Armour: Waterline belt: 4 in (100 mm); Armoured flight deck: 1–4 in (25–102 mm); Hangar side: 1 in (25 mm); Hangar deck: 1 in (25 mm)
- Aircraft carried: As built: 60; Post-refit (1964): 45; Final (1971): 39
- Notes: 1951: standard axial flight deck; 1954: 5.5º angled flight deck; 1964: 8.5º angled flight deck

HMS Eagle was an Audacious-class aircraft carrier of the Royal Navy, in service 1951–1972. Until the arrival of the Queen Elizabeth-class aircraft carriers in the 21st century, she and her sister Ark Royal were the two largest Royal Navy aircraft carriers ever built.

She was laid down during World War II on 24 October 1942 at Harland and Wolff shipyard in Belfast as one of four ships of the Audacious class. Two were cancelled at the end of hostilities, and the remaining two were suspended. Originally called Audacious, she was renamed Eagle (the fifteenth Royal Navy ship to receive this name), taking the name of the cancelled third ship of the class on 21 January 1946. She was finally launched by Princess Elizabeth on 19 March 1946.

Although Eagle was completed in October 1951 without an angled flight deck, one was added three years later. In 1952 she took part in the first large NATO naval exercise, Exercise Mainbrace.

== Design and construction ==
The Audacious-class aircraft carriers were intended as a larger follow-on to the Implacable-class of aircraft carriers with armoured hangars, with the design being modified before orders being placed to accommodate larger and heavier aircraft, which led to the displacement growing from the originally planned 27,000 long tons (27,433 t) to 32,500 long tons (33,022 t) by the time the ships were ordered. Four ships were ordered, although one, Africa, was cancelled before construction began.

The first of the class, Audacious was laid down at Harland & Wolff's Belfast shipyard on 24 October 1942. Construction was slowed by the need to concentrate resources on more urgent requirements, such as the construction of landing craft, and none of the ships of the class had been launched when the end of the Second World War brought large cuts in the shipbuilding programme for the Royal Navy. The third ship of the class, Eagle, which was only 26% complete, was canceled in December 1945, with Audacious being renamed Eagle on 21 January 1946. The newly renamed Eagle was launched by Princess Elizabeth on 19 March 1946, but construction of the two carriers was slowed for three years while the Royal Navy's requirements for aircraft carriers was reviewed, it being eventually decided to complete Eagle to a similar standard to that planned in 1945, while Ark Royal would be completed to an improved design. Eagle was finally completed on 1 October 1951.

As built, Eagle was 803 feet 9 inches (244.98 m) long overall, 750 feet 0 inches (228.60 m) at the waterline and 720 feet 0 inches (219.46 m) between perpendiculars, with a beam of 112 feet 9 inches (34.37 m) and a draught of 36 feet 0 inches (10.97 m) at deep load. Displacement was 43,060 long tons (43,751 t) standard, with full load of up to 53,390 long tons (54,247 t). (Note: Chesneau gives a standard displacement of 36,800 long tons (37,391 t) and a full load displacement of 45,720 long tons (46,454 t). Jane's Fighting Ships 1960–61 gives a full load displacement of 53,000 long tons (53,850 t).) Eight Admiralty three-drum water-tube boilers fed steam to Parsons single-reduction geared steam turbines rated at 152,000 shaft horsepower (113,000 kW) which in turn drove four propeller shafts. This gave a speed of 31.5 knots (36.2 mph; 58.3 km/h) at deep load.

== Service ==
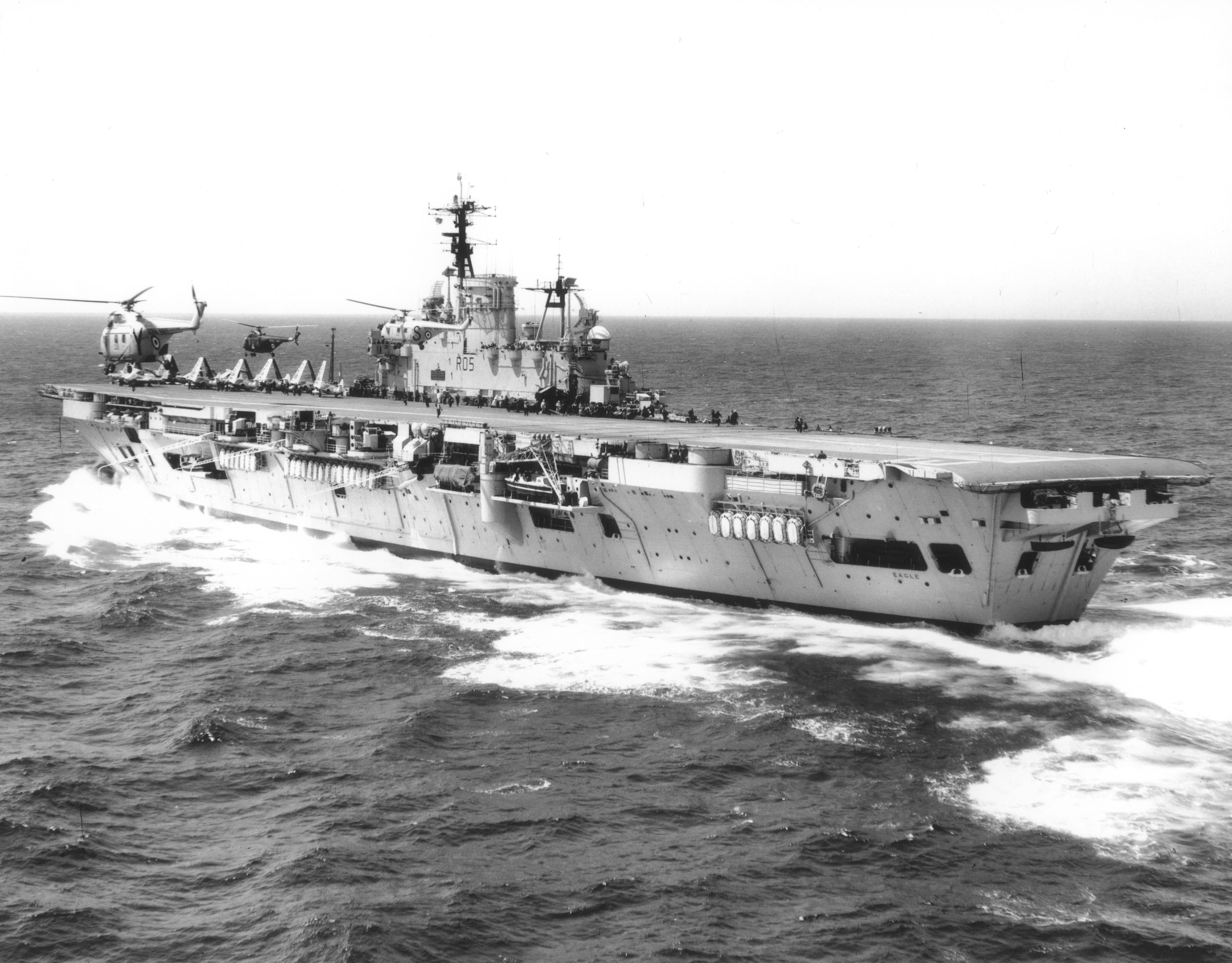
Whirlwinds fly off Eagle in the late 1950s, before her rebuild

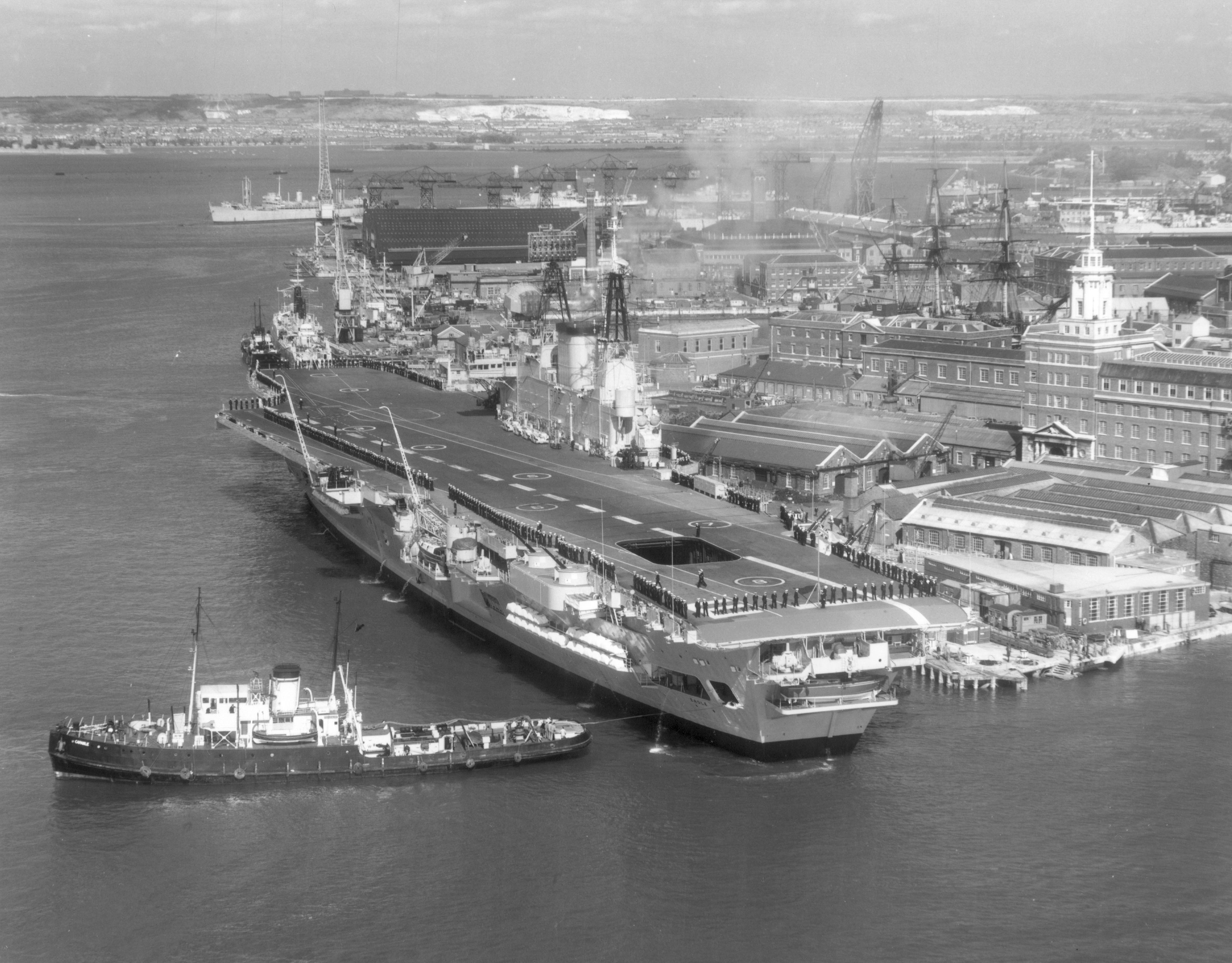
At Portsmouth's South Railway Jetty after the 1964 rebuild, with remodelled island

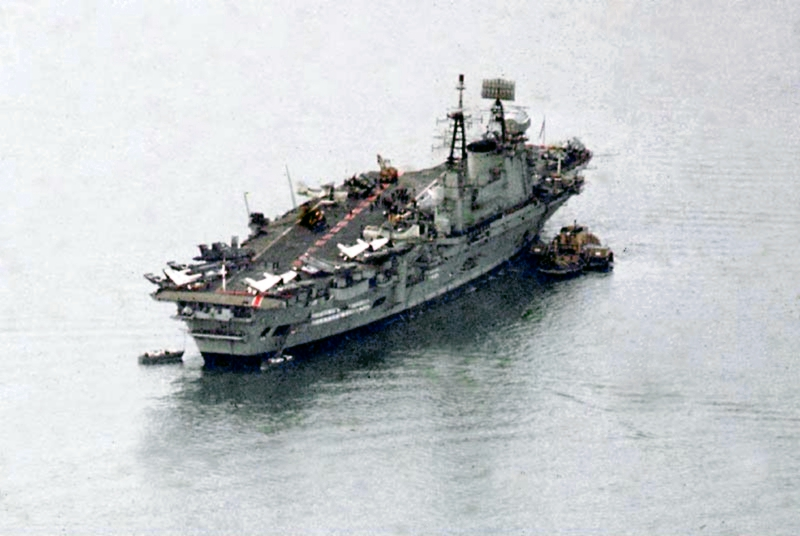
HMS Eagle moored in Gibraltar in January 1970

Eagle started Sea trials on 31 October 1951, with initial flying trials starting on 14 February 1952 and the ship being accepted into service on 1 March 1952. Eagle continued to work up her crew, embarking an initial air wing equipped with two squadrons of Supermarine Attacker jet fighters, two squadrons of Fairey Firefly anti-submarine aircraft and a squadron of Blackburn Firebrand attack aircraft, and in September 1952, took part in the big NATO naval exercise, Exercise Mainbrace off the coast of Norway and Denmark.

In early 1953 Eagle visited the Mediterranean, before returning to home waters when in June she took part in the Fleet Review at Spithead to celebrate the Coronation of Queen Elizabeth II. She joined the Mediterranean Fleet in February 1954, before returning to British waters in May.

Eagle was refitted at Devonport Dockyard from June 1954 to February 1955. In order to ease operations with jet aircraft, the ship was fitted with a 5.5 degree angled flight deck, which owing to the width of Eagle's flight deck, could be accommodated without major structural changes, although it required the ship's arrestor gear to be rearranged, and removal of nine Bofors guns (one Mark-6 six barrelled mount and three single mounts). A mirror landing aid was also fitted. Following work-up, Eagle deployed to the Mediterranean before taking part in the autumn NATO exercises in the North Atlantic. In May 1956, Eagle was deployed to Malta to work up for another stint in the Mediterranean Fleet.

Eagle's first wartime service came in 1956, when she took part in the Suez Crisis with Captain H C D MacLean, DSC in command. The ship's aircraft of that period included Westland Wyverns, Douglas Skyraiders, Hawker Sea Hawks and de Havilland Sea Venoms.

=== Rebuild ===
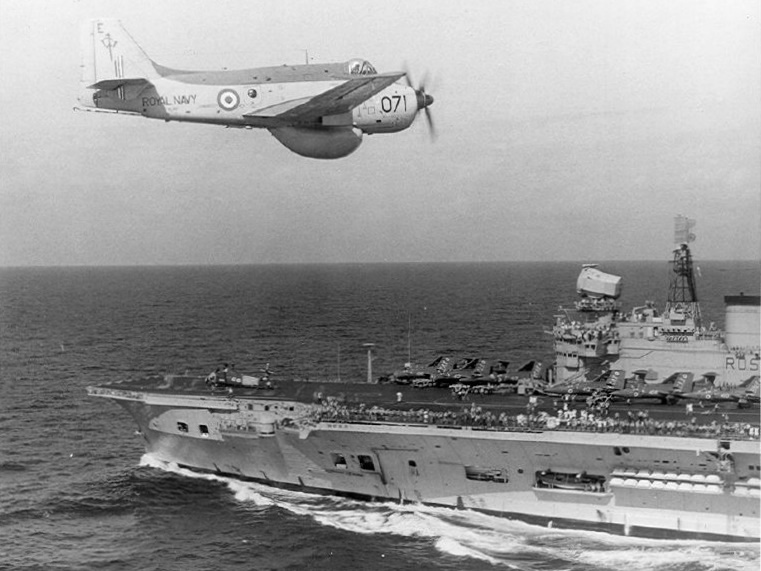
A Fairey Gannet AEW of 849 Naval Air Squadron Fleet Air Arm overflying HMS Eagle in the early 1970s

The Admiralty had originally planned to give Eagle a complete rebuild on the lines of HMS Victorious, but due to high costs, plans to fit new geared steam turbines and a stretched hull were abandoned. Eagle was instead given a more austere but extensive modernization that provided greater radar and processing capability than the systems fitted to Victorious. The changes included major improvements to the accommodation, including the installation of air conditioning. The island was completely rebuilt and a 3D Type 984 radar was installed, with processing capacity to track and rank 100 targets, twice the capability of the early 984 system fitted to Hermes and Victorious. The flight deck was modified and included a new 2½ inch armoured deck with a full 8.5 degree angle, two new steam catapults (BS5s, 151 ft (46 m) stroke on the port side forward and 199 ft (61 m) stroke in the waist) were fitted as well as new arrester gear (DAX I) and mirror sights. As well as an overhaul of the DC electrical systems, AC generators were also fitted to give additional power.

It was decided that Eagle would have her anti-aircraft guns removed and replaced by the Seacat missile system, though her aft four 4.5 inch gun turrets were retained, and all of her original machinery and equipment would be fully overhauled.

In 1959 Eagle entered Devonport Dockyard to begin this extensive refit, and by May 1964 it was complete. Standard displacement had increased to around 44,100 tons (full load displacement was 54,100 tons) and Eagle was now the largest aircraft carrier in the Royal Navy. Total cost of the refit was £31 million. The refit was intended to extend her operational life for another 10 years, and she now operated Blackburn Buccaneer, de Havilland Sea Vixen, Supermarine Scimitar and Fairey Gannet aircraft, but water-cooled jet blast deflectors (needed to operate the RN Phantom fighters) were not fitted, and therefore the full potential of the ship was not realized. In 1964–1965 it was claimed Eagle and the proposed CVA01 and half sized Hermes would be a viable three carrier fleet until 1980. Victorious would have been replaced by CVA01 in 1973. In reality the 1958 Royal Navy assessment was that with affordable modernization of the existing carrier fleet, only HMS Hermes would be effective after 1975, and she was too small. These assessments by the Director of Naval Construction in November 1958 were very accurate, taking into account the slower than expected pace of reconstruction, corrosion of war-built hulls, the obsolete power trains except in Victorious, and the cheap unsatisfactory mix of DC electrics with AC add-on generators where needed in Eagle and Ark Royal.

=== Refit ===
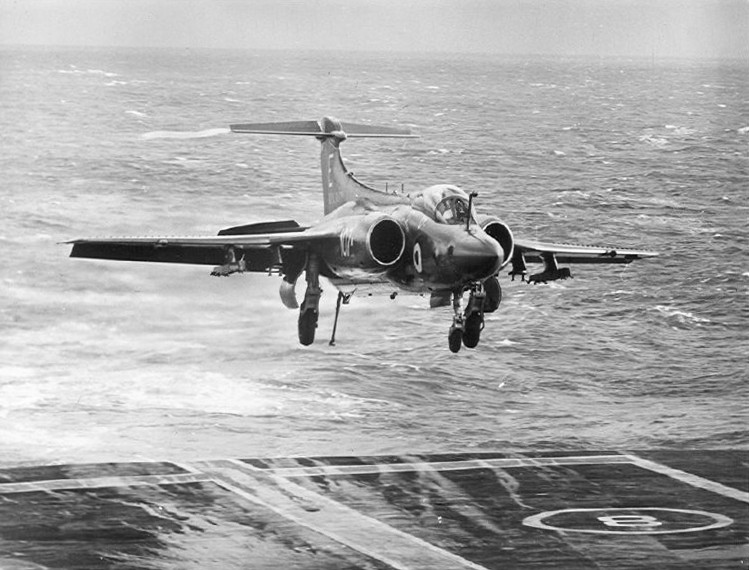
Blackburn Buccaneer landing on Eagle, c.1971

In early 1966 Eagle was refitted at Devonport once more and was fitted with a single DAX II arrestor wire (no.3, her other wires were DAX I). She was recommissioned in 1967.

Eagle was originally intended to receive a further refit that would have enabled her to comfortably operate the McDonnell Douglas Phantom (she had already successfully operated them in trials). Her two BS5 catapults fitted in her 1959–64 refit were already powerful enough to launch fully laden F-4s, but her Jet Blast Deflectors were still of the older steel plate design, and the reheated exhaust of the Phantom's Rolls-Royce Spey engines required water-cooled deflector plates. It was also planned to fit bridle catchers to the catapults as a cost-saving measure, as the bridles would otherwise be lost after a single launch.

During the Phantom FG1 trials (involving three newly delivered aircraft operated by 700P NAS) the longer waist catapult was used, and a thick steel plate was chained to the deck behind the catapult to absorb the heat of the Phantom's afterburners. The JBD was not used as it would have been damaged, and after each launch fire hoses sprayed water on the deck plate to cool it down before the next aircraft could be loaded onto the catapult.

While fitting adequate blast deflectors and other minor changes for Phantom operation were estimated to cost no more than £5 million in 1968, refitting the ship to operate with a modern airgroup of Phantoms into the late 1970s was clearly going to cost much more, and the new Conservative government in 1970 confirmed plans to convert Hermes to a Commando carrier and withdraw Eagle. In February 1972, the Secretary of State for Defence, Lord Carrington, estimated refitting Eagle to operate Phantoms would cost £25–30 million, and the overall manpower and cost requirements of operating two large strike carriers were beyond Britain, particularly as Ark Royal was expected to serve to the end of the 1970s with only two short refits. To preserve Eagle in maintained or unmaintained reserve would require refits, estimated at around £4 million, every 3–4 years, and maintenance crew of 350–400 Navy personnel for £1.5–2 million a year. Reactivation would take four and a half months to a year, while maintaining a Sea Vixen squadron was unjustified expense for aircraft that were obsolete. The refit of Ark Royal cost £32 million to allow operations of a fully modern airwing, though it was generally accepted that even after her return to service she considered to be in a significantly worse overall material state in comparison to Eagle.

=== Decommissioning ===
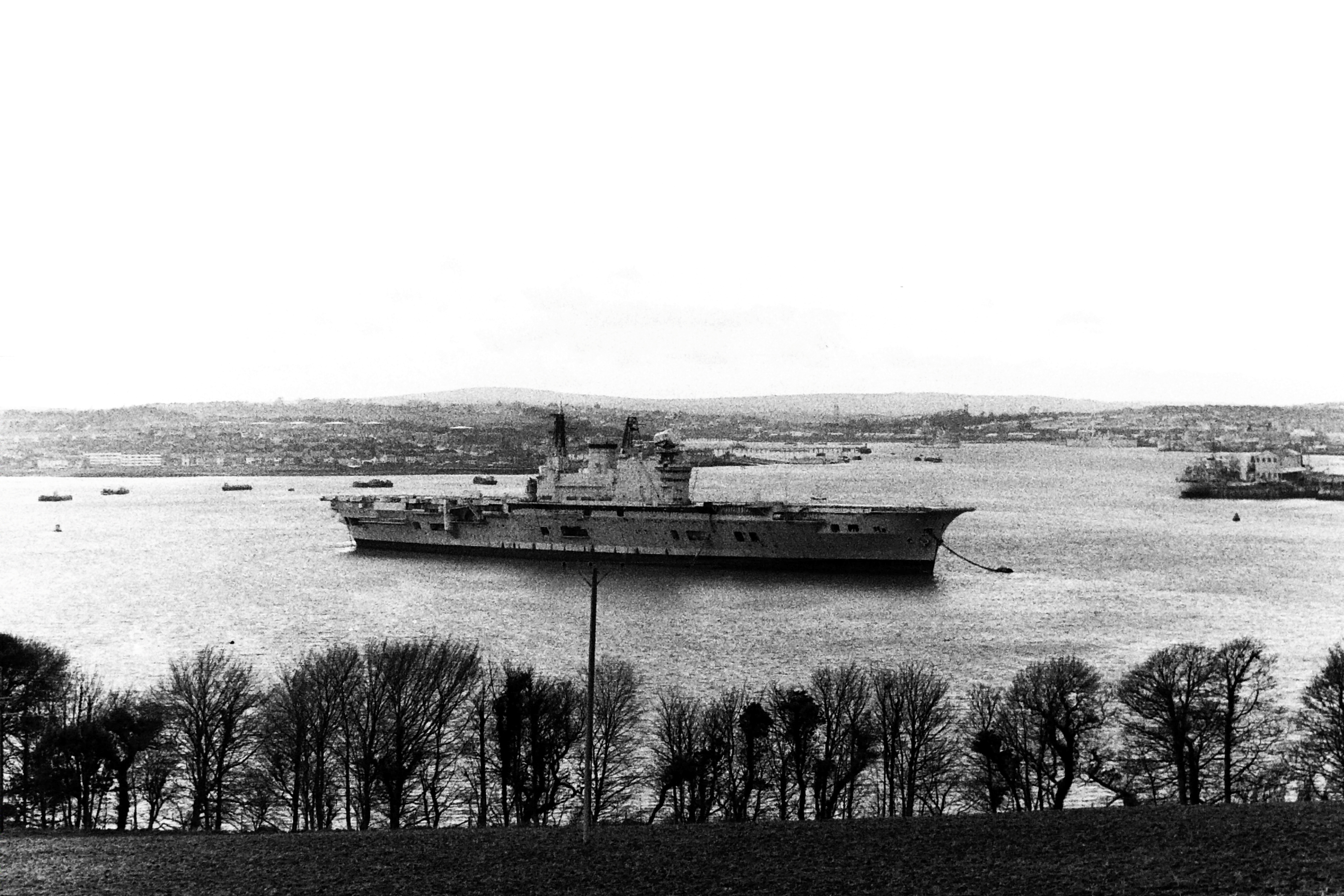
Eagle laid up following decommissioning

The 1966 decision to run-down the RN fixed wing carrier fleet (Centaur had already been laid up as an accommodation ship, and Victorious was soon to be prematurely scrapped, following a minor fire) meant Eagle's days were numbered. Eagle was paid off in January 1972 at Portsmouth after 20 years and 4 months of service, and was stripped of reusable equipment (radars and missile systems primarily), after which she was towed to Devonport where she was placed in reserve and moored in a stretch of the River Tamar known as the Hamoaze. In 1974 she was released from her moorings, towed up river, and secured in number 10 Dock, Devonport Dockyard, where she was further stripped of essential spares for Ark Royal, before being towed back to her mooring position.

Up until 1976 she was officially still in reserve, but having been exhausted as a source of spares for Ark Royal, Eagle was then sold for scrap and towed from Devonport on 14 October 1978 to Cairnryan near Stranraer to be broken up, clearing her mooring space for her sister and arriving there five days later. The lower hull of Eagle was still being broken up when her sister Ark Royal arrived at Cairnryan for demolition on 28 September 1980. One of her anchors (along with one of Ark Royal's) stands guard at the entrance to the Fleet Air Arm Museum in Yeovilton.

Final air wing 1971
Squadron	Aircraft type	Number of aircraft	Role
800 NAS	Buccaneer S2	14	Strike
899 NAS	Sea Vixen FAW2	12	Fleet Air Defence
849D NAS	Gannet AEW3	4	Airborne Early Warning
849D NAS	Gannet COD4	1	Carrier On-Board Delivery
826 NAS	Sea King HAS1	6	Anti-Submarine Warfare
Ships Flight	Wessex HAS1	2	Search and Rescue

== See also ==
- Type 984 radar

== Sources ==
- Blackman, Raymond V. B. Jane's Fighting Ships 1960–61. London: Sampson Low, Marston & Co. Ltd., 1960.
- Blackman, Raymond V. B. Jane's Fighting Ships 1971–72. London: Sampson Low, Marston & Co Ltd, 1971. ISBN 0-354-00096-9.
- Blackman, Raymond. Ships of the Royal Navy. London: Macdonald and Jane's, 1973.
- Brown, David. Carrier Air Groups: HMS Eagle. Windsor, UK: Hylton Lacy, 1972. ISBN 0-85064-103-9.
- Brown, David K. Nelson to Vanguard: Warship Design and Development 1923–1945. Barnsley, UK: Seaforth Publishing, 2012. ISBN 978-1-84832-149-6.
- Brown, David K. and Moore, George. Rebuilding the Royal Navy: Warship Design Since 1945. Barnsley, UK: Seaforth Publishing, 2012. ISBN 978-1-84832-150-2.
- Chesneau, Roger. Aircraft Carriers of the World, 1914 to the Present: An Illustrated Encyclopedia. London: Brockhampton Press, 1998. ISBN 1-86019-875-9.
- Gardiner, Robert and Stephen Chumbley. Conway's All the World's Fighting Ships 1947–1995. Annapolis, MD, USA:Naval Institute Press, 1995. ISBN 1-55750-132-7.
- McCart, Neil. HMS Eagle 1942–1978. Cheltenham, UK: Fan Publications, 1996. ISBN 0-9519538-8-5.
- "The NATO Exercises: Part I: The Overall Picture: Mainbrace". Flight, Vol. LXII, Issue 2279, 26 September 1952, pp. 402–404.
- "The NATO Exercises: Part II: Flying with the Hold Fast Squadrons: Last Phases of Mainbrace". Flight, Vol. LXII, Issue 2280, 3 October 1952, pp. 449–454.
