= Comprehensive Display System =

The Comprehensive Display System (CDS) was a command, control, and coordination system of the British Royal Navy (RN) that worked with the detection/search Type 984 radar. The system was installed on a total of six ships starting in 1957. The US Navy purchased a prototype CDS and produced twenty of their own version, the Electronic Data System (EDS). These were used on a number of ships until 1968. A modified version, the Data Handling System, was used with the AMES Type 82 radar by the Royal Air Force, and US Air Force very nearly used it as well.

The CDS allowed operators to assign objects on the radar display different IDs and combined them together onto a single display which allowed intercept officers to have a unified display of location, raid size, and altitude. The CDS made it easy for operators to vector friendly fighters onto intercept courses with unknown targets and later versions could automatically calculate the interception points. The basic idea of the CDS was extremely influential in military circles and led to computerized versions in the form of DATAR, Naval Tactical Data System, and SAGE.

The trackball (known as "ball tracker" at the time) was invented by Ralph Benjamin as part of his work for the CDS in 1946. The prototype, named roller ball, was patented in 1947, but kept as a secret inside the military. It laid the foundation to input devices such as the computer mouse. Production units used a joystick in place of the trackball.

== History ==
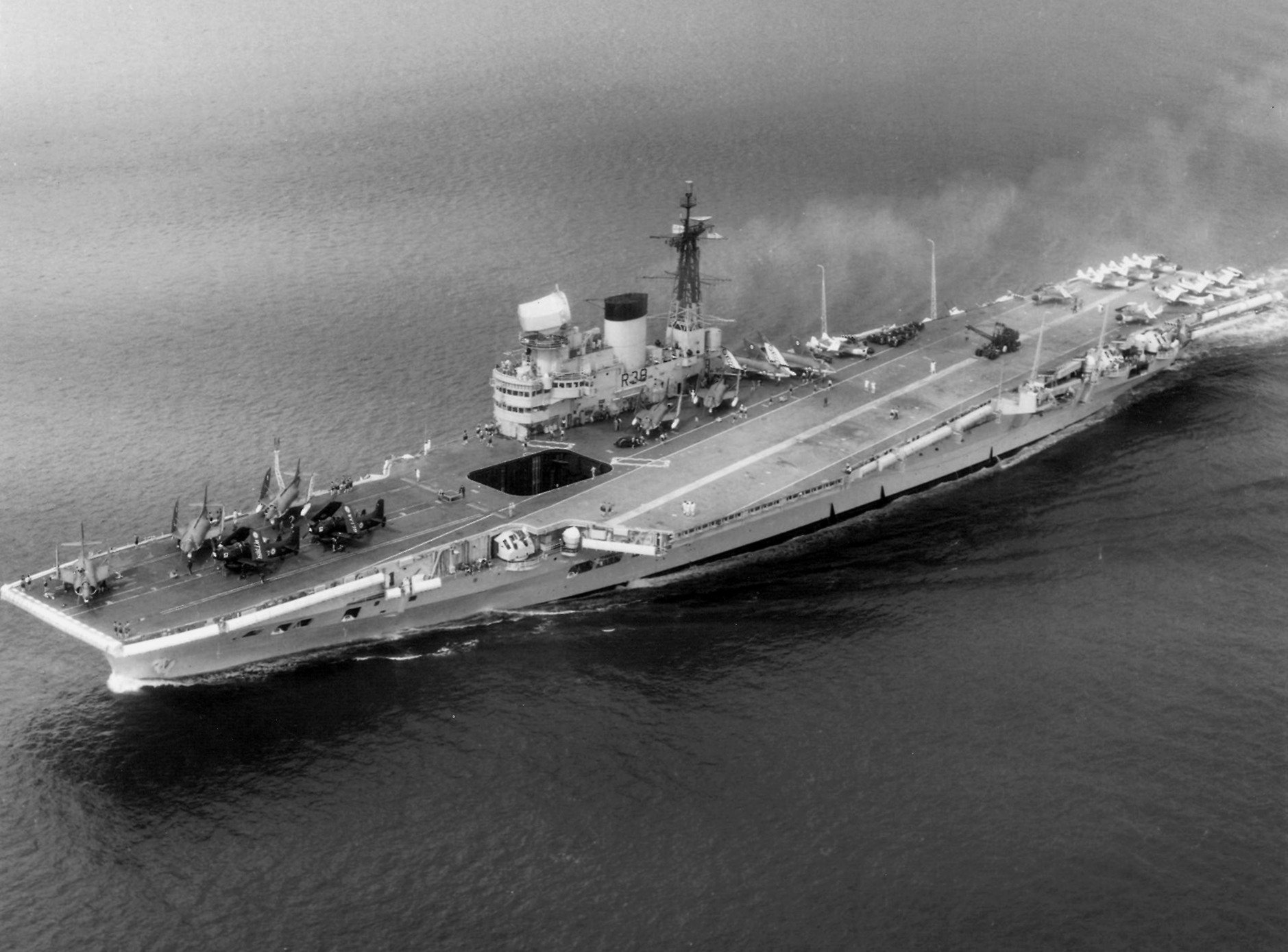
HMS Victorious was the first ship to use the CDS. The Type 984 radar that fed data to the CDS can be seen mounted in front of the funnel.

=== Initial work ===
In the post-war era, Elliott Brothers began concentrating on automation solutions for fire control, and on 1 December 1946 they began work on what would develop into the CDS. The initial idea was to collect ASDIC data on various targets from different ships in a task group and then produce a single unified view using a new display system that overlaid symbols on a large-format plan-position indicator (PPI) radar display. (Note: The concept underlying CDS is identical to that of the Canadian DATAR system, which began development shortly after seeing CDS.) Elliott received a patent for this "Peevish" system in 1947.

Although the initial concept was to net ASDIC data, in 1947 attention turned to the aircraft plotting problem. Toward the end of the Second World War, manual fighter direction systems experienced saturation and degraded performance when subjected to Kamikaze attacks. The key development was a new effort to develop a powerful 3D radar system to replace previous designs. Eventually known as the Type 984 radar, it would so greatly increase the amount of data available that plotting it all was seen as a serious concern.

The first complete system for the aircraft role was demonstrated at Elliott's Borehamwood research center in June 1950. This eventually led to a contract for two prototype versions; the original prototype was delivered as "X1" to the Admiralty Research Establishment in Witley in 1951, and a second newly built model, "X2", which was paid for by the US Navy's Bureau of Ships but officially on permanent loan to the US Naval Research Laboratory.

=== Royal Navy use ===
At first, there was no pressing need for the CDS, and production was not undertaken. However, the development of the Seaslug missile set off a series of events that led to the introduction of CDS some years later. Seaslug required the long-range and height-finding of the Type 984 but the County-class destroyers, the only ships armed with Seaslug, (Note: In 1955, Sealug was expected to arm a large cruiser and - ultimately - the County class destroyer, but within the few years the cruiser was cancelled.) were too small to carry the large radar. (Note: Design studies showed that the destroyer could only fit two of the following: Seaslug, 4.5-inch guns, and the Type 984. The guns were for cold and "warm" war mission, and were not deemed essential for protecting carriers from air attack.)

The solution was to add a digital data link to CDS, called Digital Picture Transmission (DPT) or Link I; the use of a digital link may have been inspired by DATAR's digital link, which the Royal Canadian Navy had demonstrated in 1953. The aircraft carrier transmitted radar contact data from its Type 984 over DPT to the escorting County destroyers, which used the data to locate targets with their smaller radars for Seaslug. Pye Ltd. was given the production contract.

The CDS/Type 984 combination entered service with HMS Victorious in 1958, having been fitted during the ship's extensive post-war refit. After significant training during 1958, RAF Bomber Command began a series of mock attacks on the ship and found that even their V bombers were being intercepted with ease by aircraft that were considered inferior. During one such exercise, a fleet of six English Electric Canberra bombers were all intercepted.

Shortly thereafter, twenty-three US Navy jet bombers from Naval Air Station Oceana attacked while Victorious approached the US, resulting in the USN tallying twenty-one of their aircraft successfully intercepted. The ship was approaching the US as part of the large Riptide military exercise with the United States Navy. From 15 to 20 July 1959 the USN attempted to attack the Victorious repeatedly with ever-larger groups and most sophisticated attack plans. The Victorious met every single one. CDS provided a "decisive advantage" that allowed inferior RN fighters to "grossly outperform" USN fighters. The USN was unable to saturate RN fighter direction.

This was followed with the CDS being fitted to the new HMS Hermes and the first batch of four of the eight County-class destroyers. Unknown to the developers of the original CDS, another division within Elliott was developing a purely electronic version of the same basic concept, the Action Data Automation, and a developed version of this system would ultimately replace the original model on most RN ships.

=== British Army and RAF ===
Starting in 1949, the British Army began development of a new tactical control radar that would provide early warning and putting-on information for up to sixteen dispersed batteries of anti-aircraft artillery spread over a city-wide area. This presented the same sort of problem that the Navy faced with its dispersed destroyers; the AA guns had small radars on-site, but these did not provide a long-range picture of the battle as a whole. They learned of the CDS and became interested in adapting it for the new radar. During development, in 1953 the role of air defence over the UK passed from the Army to the Royal Air Force, who took up development and renamed the radar the AMES Type 82.

In this role, the renamed Data Handling System (DHS) was somewhat more complex, consisting of separate operators to handle initial detection and picking out tracks that were interesting, then handing off those tracks to detail trackers who continued fine-tracking of the targets. A third set of operators handed separate height-finding radars (if used) and the identification friend-or-foe interrogators, feeding that information into the system on a less frequent basis. Those detailed tracks could then be sent to the AA sites, where the data could automatically cue, or "lay-on", their local radars.

The Type 82 was used in its intended military role for only a short period, before being passed off to mixed military/civilian air traffic control role in the midlands. In this role, the DHS proved invaluable in handling large numbers of aircraft movements. The system remained in service into the 1980s.

=== US Navy development ===
The US Navy was "wowed" by the demonstration CDS when they visited Borehamwood in 1950. This led to the construction of the X2 model, which arrived at the Naval Research Center in 1952. X2 "did much to sell the concept" of the CDS, but they found many details that concerned them.

Foremost was its size, which would limit it to larger ships. They were more interested in a system that could be used on a large portion of the fleet. They also found it to be sensitive to changes in temperature, lacking precision, and given its large number of moving parts, difficult to maintain. A final problem was that they desired a system capable of tracking hundreds of objects, not dozens, and adding the additional channels to the CDS would be expensive.

This led to their own version, the Electronic Data System. This was very similar to the original CDS but included a number of detail changes. Happy with the results, in 1955 the Bureau of Ships sent a contract to Motorola to build 20 EDS systems. The first was installed on USS Willis A. Lee in 1956, then on the four ships of Destroyer Division 262, and as well as a selection of guided missile cruisers. During tests in 1959, the ships of 262 were able to exchange data using the SSA-21 at ranges up to 400 miles (640 km).

Most of these units remained in use through the 1960s, finally being replaced in 1968 by the Navy Tactical Data System.

=== USAF interest ===
The prototype CDS was also viewed by the US Air Force, who were at that time exploring their needs for air plotting. They were already involved in the project that would ultimately emerge as the all-digital SAGE system but were exploring alternatives as well. One of these was proposed by the University of Michigan's Willow Run Research Center, who suggested adding a data transmission system to CDS. Ultimately the Air Force continued with the original SAGE development, whose AN/FSQ-7 computers were the largest ever built.

== Description ==
=== "X" versions ===
The CDS system had several layers of input that constructed the overall air picture. This started with operators sitting at conventional radar displays that had been equipped with a joystick. The joystick's internal potentiometers produced a changing voltage in X and Y as the stick moved. These signals were sent to the deflection plates of a separate channel in the cathode ray tube display, overlaying a dot on the existing radar imagery to provide a cursor, or as it was known in the UK for historical reasons, a strobe. Along the side of the display was a series of buttons that allowed the operator to indicate that they had placed the cursor on one of up to eight targets.

Data was collected by the Coordinated Display Equipment (CDE). Inside the CDE, a telephone stepper switch was used to periodically connect to each of the operator's displays in turn. Depending on which button was being held down on the input console at that time, the switch connected the operator's joystick to one of 96 pairs of servomotors connected to potentiometers. The voltage from the joystick drove the servomotor to rotate the CDE's internal potentiometer to match the value of the one in the joystick, thereby copying its value.

The value of those internal potentiometers was also sent back to the input consoles, creating a blip on the screen that matched the underlying radar data, but did not move. The operators could then see how much the target had moved since they last updated the CDE, and then prioritize which ones they wanted to update. In the prototype versions, there were only three input stations allowing a total of 24 targets to be tracked, but they could also read up to eight more inputs from external sources, nominally data from other ships. A production version would have more input stations to fully expand the capabilities of the CDE.

In addition to the encoding potentiometers, the CDE also contained a series of ten-position uniselector switches that were used to encode additional numerical information for each input. These included a two-digit track number, a single digit indicating high, medium or low altitude, a digit indicating whether it was friendly, hostile or unidentified and another indicating whether it was a single aircraft, a small group or a large formation.

The output from the CDE was sent to a separate large-format plan-position indicator (PPI) display. By rapidly cycling through the potentiometers, the beam in the display caused a series of spots to appear on the screen, representing the location of the (up to) 96 targets. The operator could select different sets of targets to display, only the high altitude ones for instance, or only friendly aircraft. The prototypes also included a "conference display", a 24 inches (610 mm) Photographic Display Unit that updated once every 15 seconds and was large enough to allow multiple operators to view the same imagery.

Initially, the system considered using a multi-coloured disk that was spun in front of the PPI display, timed so symbols would be drawn while a particular colour was over the display. This concept, which was common in early mechanical television systems of the era, would allow different symbols to have different colours. When this method was found to be impractical, the concept changed to use different symbols instead. This used a series of ten symbols to represent a different group number. The number of aircraft was indicated by increasingly filling in the symbol, and the altitude by placing a line to the right of the symbol that was a dot for low altitude, half the height of the symbol for medium, and the entire height for high.

For instance, if track 41, which puts it in group 4, was a small group of aircraft flying at medium altitude, it would appear as a triangle (the symbol for group 4) with the right half filled in to indicate a small group, and a medium-height bar to the right of it indicating medium altitude. The track number and altitude in "angels" was displayed to the upper and lower left of the symbol.

=== Production models ===
The original CDS concept used a complex set of motors and potentiometers to encode data, which was difficult to keep running properly. Pye's solution for the production version was to replace these with capacitors that stored a voltage corresponding to the position of the joystick. Since the voltage slowly leaked out of the capacitors, the system used a memory refresh system to keep it accurate. This greatly improved the availability of the system.

The production version used a simplified display system that removed the symbols. In their place, the original radar blip was displayed, but surrounded by additional data in the form of two-digit numbers. The track number remained in the upper left, but the altitude moved to the lower right. In the upper right was the store number, the local set of registers storing this track. This allowed the system to have a global track number across the task force while each receiving CDS could assign it to a different local ID. In the lower right was the category in the first digit and the size (single, small group, large formation; 1, 2, 3) in the second.

A later addition was the ability to track the velocity of the targets, a concept taken from the US work on their X2 model. This used an integrating circuit to measure the difference in position between subsequent measurements of any given track. This information was also fed to a separate analog computer that automatically calculated intercept locations, making the plotting of multiple intercepts much easier. This version also added additional inputs that transmitted readiness information from the aircraft carriers and missile cruisers, allowing the intercept officers to choose what weapons to assign to a given target. This information was passed from ship to ship using a new data link known as the Digital Plot Transmission (DPT) system that could also share the tracks.

Production models varied in size and capacity. The unit fit to the Victorious held 48 tracks, the Hermes had less room so its system held 32, and the systems in the County Class held 24.

=== EDS ===
To address the mechanical reliability issues seen in the X2, in 1953 the NRL adapted their CDS to store data using capacitors instead of the potentiometers, a change that would later be copied by the production CDS. This left the input consoles as the only major moving parts. They further modified their units by replacing the trackball with an electrically conductive sheet of glass which the user pressed on with a metal probe. The assembly was then placed on top of the otherwise unchanged input station display.

An additional change to the central unit added a second set of capacitors for each channel. With each sampling of the channels in the input units, the values were read into the alternating set of capacitors in the CDE. This caused the change in position between scans to be recorded. On the display, the values of these two measurements were rapidly cycled, causing the dots to elongate into short dashes, directly indicating the direction and speed of travel. Finally, they added the AN/SSA-21 unit, which read out the values and sent them as teletype signals to other ships, where they could be converted back to analog signals for display there.

Many of these changes also appeared in the production versions of the CDS, which differed primarily in the input method.

== See also ==
- Link 11
- Linesman/Mediator
