= Type 984 radar =

Royal Navy radar system

Type 984
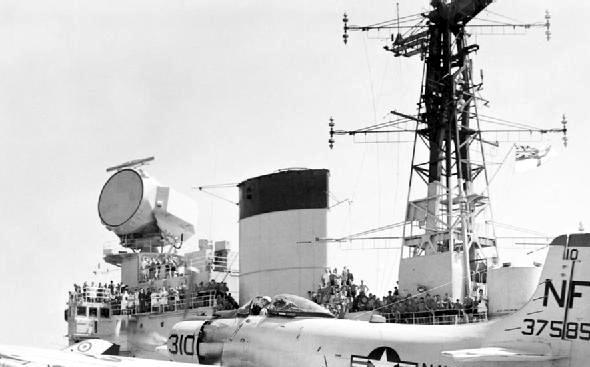
- Type 984 radar of HMS Victorious
- Country of origin: United Kingdom
- Introduced: 1956
- No. built: 3
- Frequency: S band
- Range: 180 nmi (330 km; 210 mi)

Type 984 was a Royal Navy radar system introduced in the mid-1950s, designed by the Admiralty Signals and Radar Establishment. Type 984 was a 3D S band system used for both ground controlled interception (GCI) and as a secondary early warning system.

== Description ==
The Type 984 was different from most radars in a number of ways. For one, it used a lens made of metal tubes in place of the more traditional parabolic reflector, which made it look like a circular plate rather than the open framework typical of the era. It was mounted on a fully stabilized platform, allowing it to produce a steady image in all but the highest sea states. It also used a unique system for vertical scanning, feeding the output of four cavity magnetrons into four moving feedhorns, each scanning about 5 degrees vertically. Other 3D radars of the era generally picked one solution or the other, using a network of separate feedhorns or a single vertically scanning feed. The use of four magnetrons gave it better range performance; against large high-flying aircraft it had a typical range of 180 nmi (330 km; 210 mi), although this fell to as short as 40 nmi (74 km; 46 mi) against small low flying aircraft.

A key part of the overall Type 984 installation was the Comprehensive Display System (CDS), an electromechanical computer that developed "tracks" for aircraft in a semi-automated fashion. This greatly reduced operator workload, allowing the overall system to track many dozens of formations of aircraft while continuing to scan for new contacts, what would today be known as track while scan (TWS). In several tests against US Navy aircraft during military exercises, the combination of the 984's high scanning rates and the CDS' tracking made the ships impossible to approach without being intercepted. CDS also allowed the 984 to be used both for interception control, as well as day-to-day air traffic control around the fleet aircraft carriers.

The original design called for a maximum weight of 15 long tons (15 t), and a maximum turning circle while scanning of 25 feet (7.6 m). Many Navy designs of the early 1950s intended to mount the 984, and some sported two installations, fore and aft. As the design matured its weight continued to grow, ultimately reaching 30.5 long tons (31.0 t), making it too heavy for most ships. At the same time, the Navy's inventory of large ships was shrinking. Ultimately it was mounted on only the aircraft carriers Eagle, Hermes and Victorious.
