= HMS Hermes (R12) =

1959 Centaur-class light fleet carrier of the Royal Navy

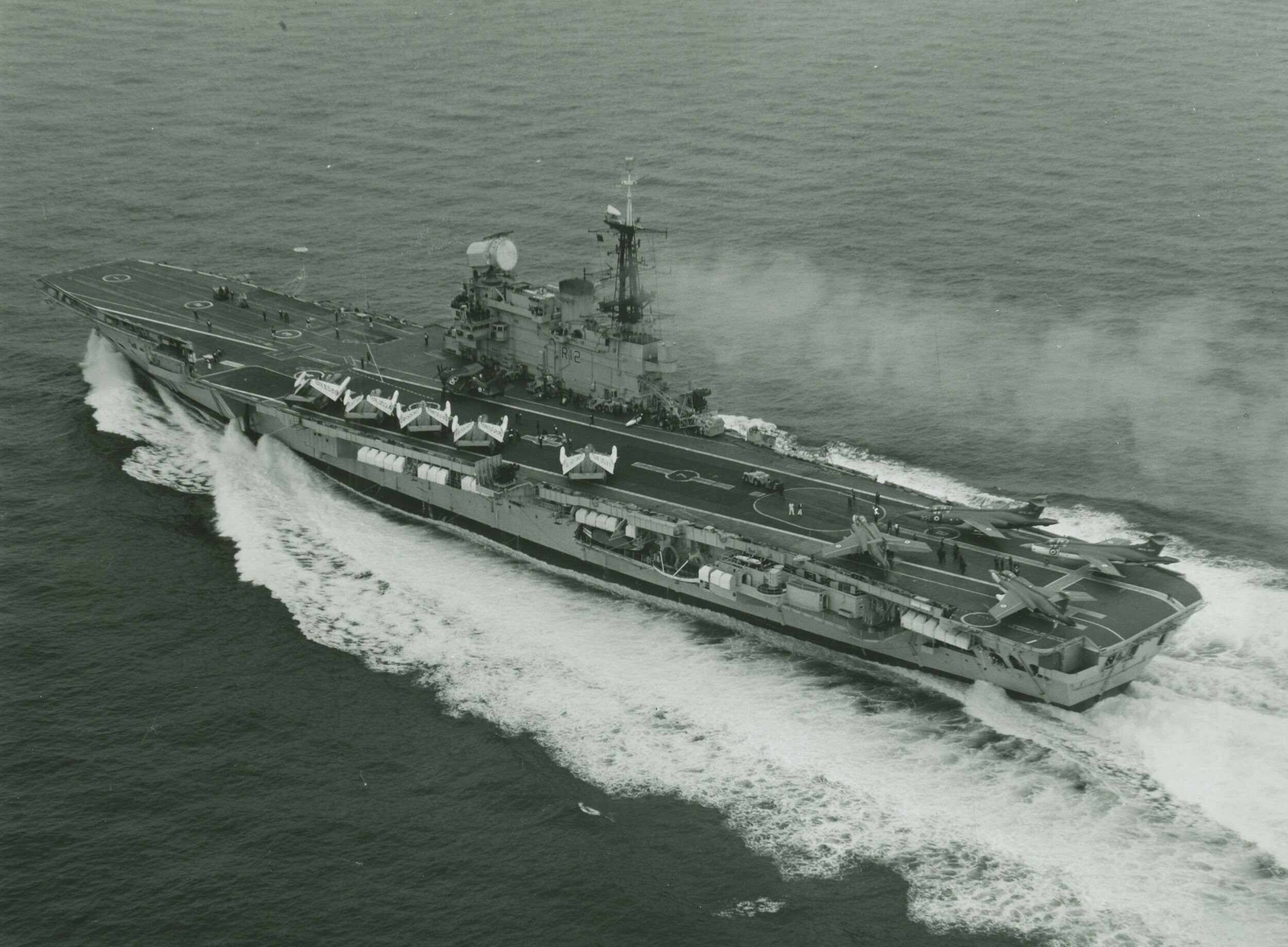
- Hermes with her final air wing prior to converting to the Commando/ASW carrier role

History

United Kingdom
- Name: Hermes
- Namesake: Hermes
- Builder: Vickers-Armstrongs
- Laid down: 21 June 1944
- Launched: 16 February 1953
- Commissioned: 25 November 1959
- Decommissioned: 1984
- Stricken: 1985
- Home port: HMNB Portsmouth
- Identification: Pennant number: 61 (1945) R12 (1951) R22 (as Viraat)
- Fate: Sold to India, 1986, and renamed Viraat

India
- Name: Viraat
- Acquired: May 1987
- Decommissioned: 6 March 2017
- Identification: Pennant number: R22
- Fate: Scrapped 2020-2021

General characteristics
- Class & type: Centaur-class aircraft carrier
- Displacement: 23,900 long tons (24,300 t) (standard); 28,700 long tons (29,200 t) (full load)
- Length: 198.12 m (650 ft 0 in) p.p.; 225.20 m (738 ft 10 in) f.d. (as built); 226.90 m (744 ft 5 in) o.a. (with ski-jump)
- Beam: 27.43 m (90 ft 0 in) w.l.; 43.90 m (144 ft 0 in) f.d.
- Draught: 8.50 m (27 ft 11 in)
- Installed power: 4 Admiralty 3-drum boilers; 76,000 shp (57,000 kW)
- Propulsion: 2 shafts; 2 geared steam turbines
- Speed: 28 knots (52 km/h; 32 mph)
- Range: 7,000 nmi (13,000 km; 8,100 mi) at 18 knots (33 km/h; 21 mph)
- Complement: 2,100
- Sensors & processing systems: MRS-3 fire-control system
- Armament: 10 × 40 mm Bofors; After 1970: 2 × Sea Cat launchers
- Aircraft carried: Up to 1970: 12 Sea Vixens, 7 Buccaneers, 5 Gannets and 6 Wessex; After 1980: up to 28 Sea Harriers and 9 Westland Sea Kings

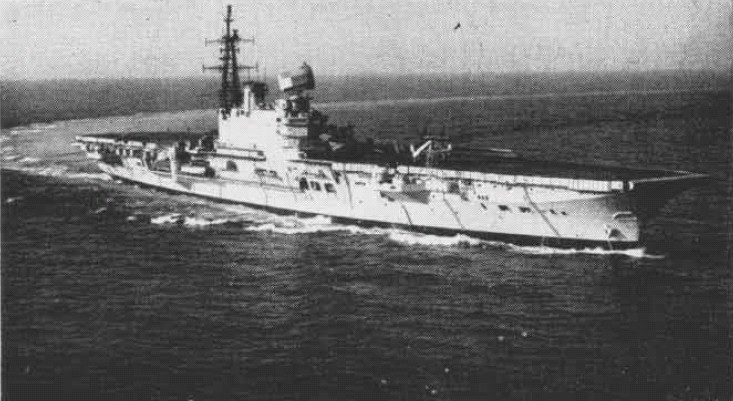
Hermes in 1962

HMS Hermes was a conventional British light aircraft carrier and the last of the Centaur class.

Hermes was in service with the Royal Navy from 1959 until 1984, and she served as the flagship of the British forces during the 1982 Falklands War.

After being sold to India in 1986, the vessel was recommissioned and remained in service with the Indian Navy as INS Viraat until 2017.

== Construction and modifications ==
The ship was laid down by Vickers-Armstrongs at Barrow-in-Furness during World War II as HMS Elephant. Construction was suspended in 1945 but work was resumed in 1952 to clear the slipway and the hull was launched on 16 February 1953. The vessel remained unfinished until 1957; then she entered service on 18 November 1959 as HMS Hermes after extensive modifications which included installation of a massive Type 984 'searchlight' 3D radar, a fully angled deck with a deck-edge lift, and steam catapults. With these changes she more resembled the reconstructed aircraft carrier Victorious than the other three ships in the class.

Hermes initially operated Supermarine Scimitar, de Havilland Sea Vixen, and Fairey Gannet fixed-wing aircraft, together with Westland Whirlwind helicopters.

== Cost ==
The construction cost of Hermes was £18 million, with a further £1 million for electronic equipment and a further £10 million for aircraft in 1959.

== Operations ==
On 16 November 1962, Hermes was cruising off of the Pembrokeshire coast in Wales when one of her helicopters carrying two politicians crashed off St David's Head. Lord Windlesham and the Member of Parliament (MP) for Loughborough, John Cronin, were returning from the carrier, which they had been visiting, to RNAS Brawdy. While Cronin and the helicopter's two-man crew were saved by another helicopter from Hermes, Lord Windlesham and an RAF officer being carried as a passenger were killed.

=== Nuclear role in the 1962 Cuban Missile Crisis ===
During the Cuban Missile Crisis in 1962, the Sea Vixen FAW1s of Hermes were tasked to bomb targets in the Soviet Union with the Red Beard nuclear bombs. An observer of the Sea Vixen squadron described his experience as follows: “We used to do ground attack, and we had a nuclear capability. During the Cuban missile crisis in 1962, I was in our squadron’s nuclear team. We were on red alert for three days, not practice, but for real. I was sweating because my target was Sevastopol in the Crimea."

=== Proposed operation of F-4 Phantom ===
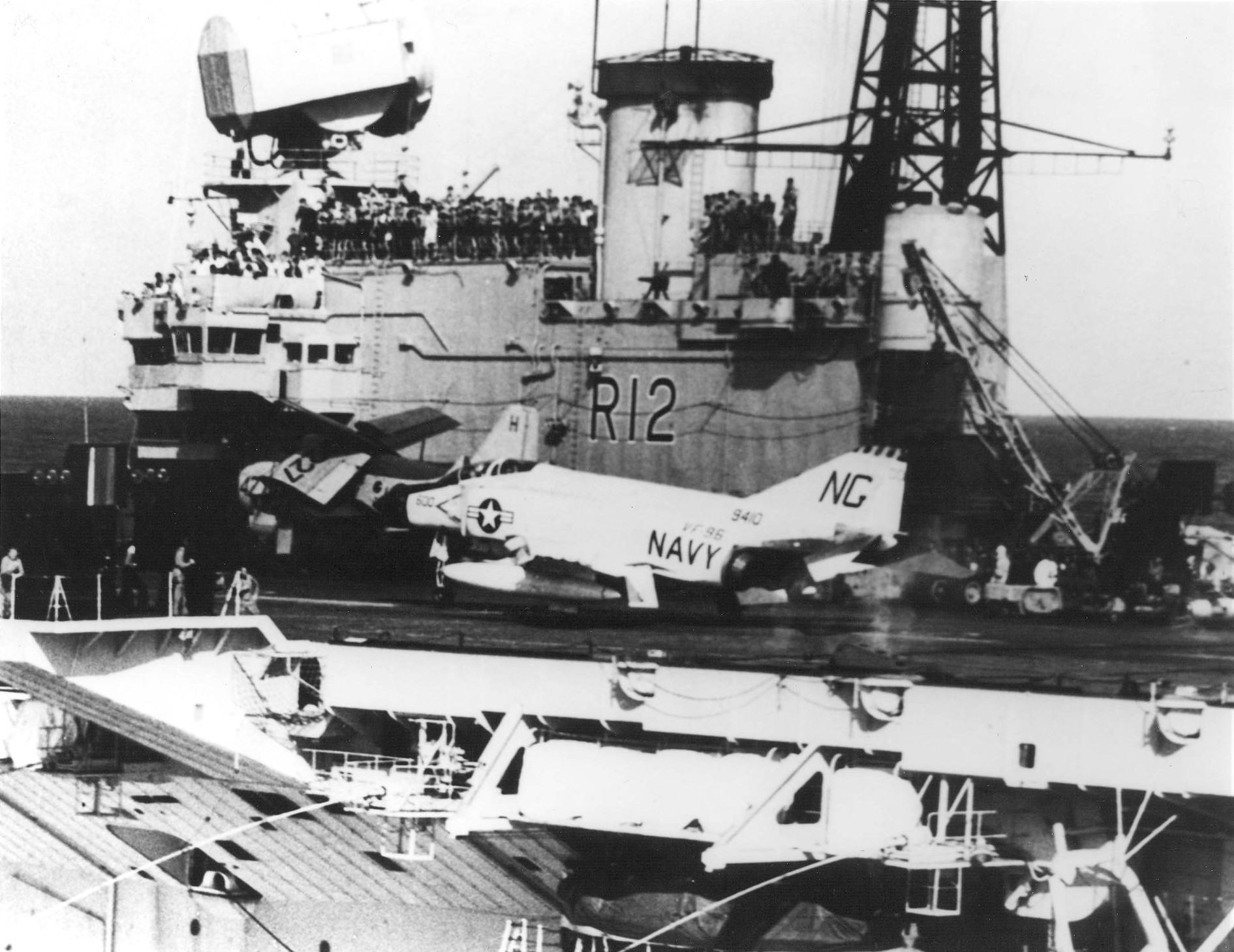
F-4B Phantom of the US Navy conducting 'touch and go' on Hermes in 1963. Although the Admiralty initially indicated that Hermes would be modernised to operate the Phantom, the plan proved unworkable owing to the ship's small size.

John Hay, Civil Lord of the Admiralty, said in Parliament on 2 March 1964 that "Phantoms will be operated from "Hermes", "Eagle" and the new carrier when it is built. ... Our present information and advice is that the aircraft should be able to operate from "Hermes" after she has undergone her refit." This seemed optimistic, as most sources believed Victorious was the smallest carrier then in commission that the modified RN F-4K versions of the Phantom could realistically have operated from. The British Rolls-Royce Spey engines replacing the US General Electric J79 were a political necessity given the cancellation of the supersonic British Hawker Siddeley P.1154 V/STOL aircraft project. The projected superior fuel efficiency using the Spey engines was overshadowed by larger engine size and inflexibility. From the smaller Hermes maximum weight at takeoff would be 25 tons rather than 28 tons when operating off Eagle. Since this lower weight at launch from Hermes would be achieved by carrying less fuel, combat air patrol duration would be 25 to 50 percent less than from Eagle; from 2–2.5 hours to 1–1.5 hrs, and only partly compensated by refuelling when airborne. It was optimistically believed Hermes could replace its Vixens with Spey-powered Phantoms on a one-to-one basis, i.e. 11–12 with 7–8 Blackburn Buccaneer strike aircraft. While the Phantoms built for the RN were modified in ways similar to Vought F-8 Crusaders for the French Navy – improving deceleration on landing – the modifications were not entirely successful. Hermes's flight deck was too short, her arresting gear as well as her catapults were not powerful enough to recover or launch the F-4Ks, even though they were slightly lighter, more economical and higher performing than their US Navy counterparts. The Phantom trials held on Hermes in 1969–1970 proved this, though in the views of the then Minister of Defence, Denis Healey, the carrier could operate the most modern aircraft, but in too small numbers to be effective. While it is clear that McNamara's claims that the F-4 was not safe for use on the USN Essex class, or 31,000-ton carriers, was rightly rejected by John Hay in 1964.

=== Proposed transfer to Australia ===
A 1966 review indicated that Hermes was surplus to operational requirements and she was offered to the Royal Australian Navy (RAN) as a replacement for HMAS Melbourne. In 1968, Hermes took part in a combined exercise with the RAN, during which the carrier was visited by senior RAN officers and Australian government officials, while RAN Douglas A-4G Skyhawks and Grumman S-2 Trackers practised landings on the larger carrier. The offer was turned down due to operating and manpower costs.

=== Proposed international fleet ===
Hermes served as one of four Royal Navy strike carriers mainly in the Indian Ocean and finally in the Mediterranean Sea until decommissioned in 1970. She could have seen action against the Egyptians when Egypt closed off the Straits of Tiran to Israeli shipping in May 1967 when the UK and US contemplated forming an international fleet to open the straits with force if necessary, but the UK backed down. According to a memorandum of conversation dated 25 May 1967 between the US Secretaty of State Dean Rusk and the British Minister of State for Foreign Affairs George Thomson, 'The British felt that a carrier [Hermes] in the Red Sea would be a sitting duck if Nasser got nasty.'

Air wing 1968–1970
| Squadron | Aircraft type | Number of aircraft | Role |
|---|---|---|---|
| 801 NAS | Blackburn Buccaneer S.2 | 7 | Strike |
| 893 NAS | de Havilland Sea Vixen FAW.2 | 12 | Fleet air defence |
| 849A NAS | Fairey Gannet AEW.3 | 4 | Airborne early warning |
| 849A NAS | Fairey Gannet COD.4 | 1 | Carrier on-board delivery |
| 814 NAS | Westland Wessex HAS.3 | 5 | Anti-submarine warfare |
| Ships Flight | Westland Wessex HAS.1 | 1 | Air-sea rescue & Utility |

According to United Kingdom Reply to 1968 Defence Planning Review, Hermes was projected to carry nine Buccaneer S2s, 12 Sea Vixen FAW2s, four Gannet AEW3s, eight Wessex HAS1s, and two Whirlwind HAR9s from the end of 1967 to the end of 1969 before being phased out in mid-1970.

=== Commando/ASW/STOVL carrier ===
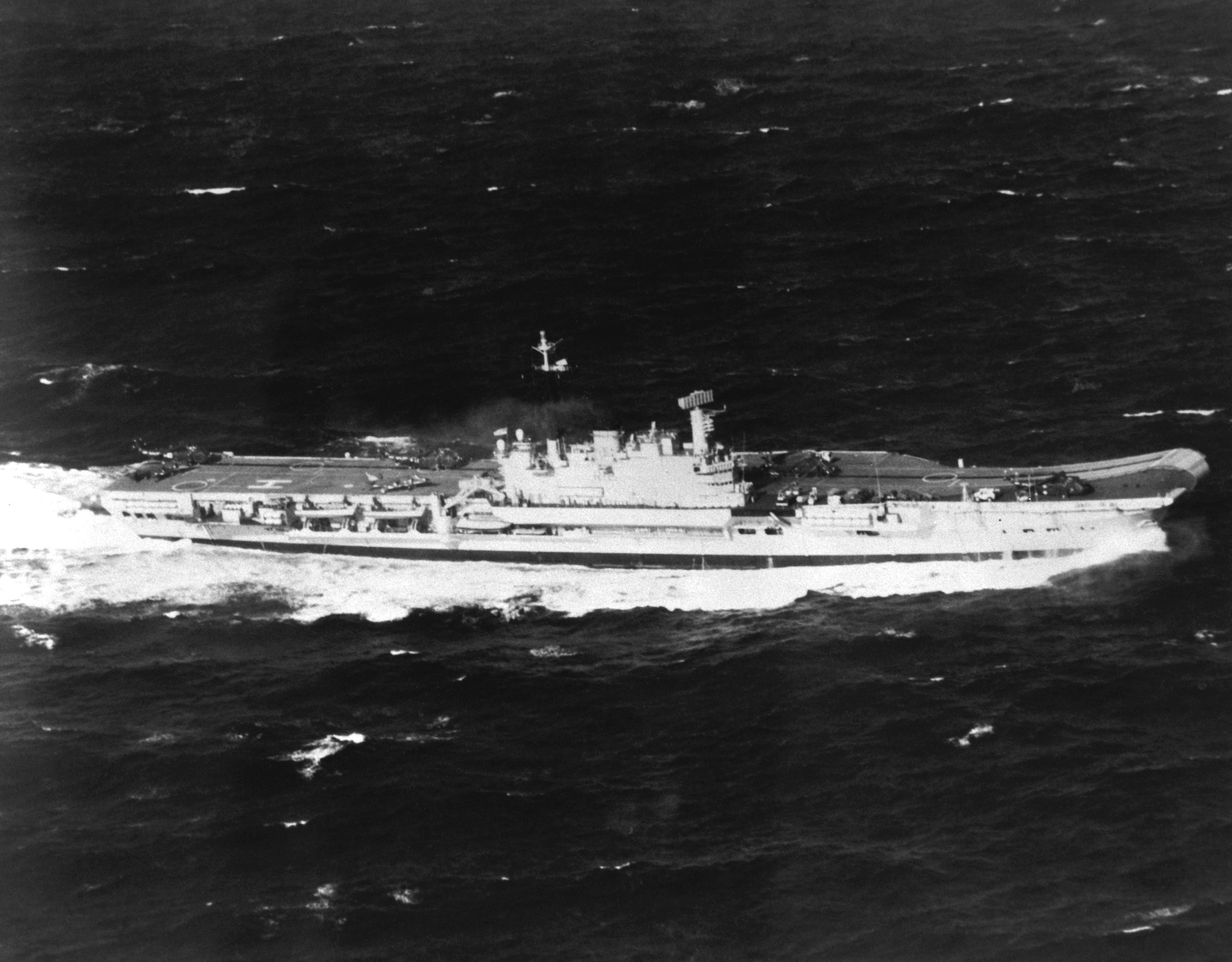
Hermes at sea in March 1982

When the decision was made in the mid-1960s to phase out fixed wing carrier operations Hermes was slated to become a "Commando Carrier" for Royal Marine operations (similar in concept to a US Navy LHA). Therefore, Hermes was docked down in number 10 Dock in Devonport Dockyard between 1971 and 1973, undergoing a conversion in which her arresting cables, steam catapults, and 3-D radar were removed. Landing craft and berthing for 800 troops were added and her airwing became approximately 20 Westland Sea King helicopters.Hermes took part in the evacuation of British civilians on Cyprus following the Turkish invasion of the northern part of the island in 1974. By 1976, with the Soviet submarine threat becoming apparent and through NATO pressure, a further mild conversion was performed for Hermes to become an anti-submarine warfare carrier to patrol the North Atlantic. Hermes underwent one more conversion and new capabilities were added when she was refitted at Portsmouth from 1980 to June 1981, during which a 12° ski-jump and facilities for operating BAe Sea Harriers were incorporated.

After this refit the air wing comprised:

- 800 NAS 5 Sea Harrier FRS.1 fighter
- 826 NAS 12 Sea King HAS.5 ASW

=== Falklands War ===
Hermes was due to be decommissioned in 1982 after the 1981 Defence Review (that would have made the Royal Navy considerably smaller) by the British government, but when the Falklands War broke out, she was made the flagship of the British forces, setting sail for the South Atlantic just three days after the Argentine invasion of the Falkland Islands. She sailed for the Falklands with an airgroup of 12 Sea Harrier FRS1 attack aircraft of the Royal Navy's Fleet Air Arm, and 18 Sea King helicopters. A few weeks after sailing, more aircraft were flown or transported via other ships to replace some losses and augment the task force. Hermes's airgroup grew to 16 Sea Harriers, 10 Hawker Siddeley Harrier GR3s of the Royal Air Force, and 10 Sea Kings (after some of the helicopters were dispersed to other ships) as well as a troop of Special Air Service (SAS) and Royal Marines. As she was the RN's largest carrier, she was considered too valuable to risk in close to the Falklands, due to the possibility of Argentine air force attacks. Her Harriers therefore operated at the limit of their endurance radius but were very successful in keeping the enemy aircraft at bay.

Air group at the height of the Falklands Conflict:

- 800 NAS – 15 Sea Harrier FRS.1
- 826 NAS – 5 Sea King HAS.5
- 846 NAS – 5 Sea King HC.4
- No. 1 Squadron RAF – 10 Harrier GR.3 (4 by long-range ferry, 6 on Atlantic Conveyor)

The aircraft carrier was carrying 16 nuclear depth bombs as part of her standard armament when she deployed for the Falklands, and was one of several Royal Navy warships so equipped during the war. The weapons were removed while she was in the South Atlantic during June 1982.

=== After the Falklands War ===
After her return home from the Falklands conflict Hermes entered into a much needed 4-month refit to her propulsion and electrical systems, as well as a thorough cleaning and repainting. When this was completed in November 1982, she embarked stores and performed work-ups exercises. She then took part in NATO exercises in the North Atlantic, and the Mediterranean Sea as a commando carrier. In the autumn of 1983 she took part in her last exercise, Ocean Safari, where she reverted to a strike carrier role, embarking 12 Sea Harriers, 10 RAF Harrier GR.3s and 10 Sea Kings. After this exercise, she called into Devonport for a minor refit and thereafter into maintained reserve in Portsmouth.

In 1983, when the proposed sale of the aircraft carrier Invincible to the Royal Australian Navy was cancelled following the Falklands War, an offer was made to sell Hermes and a squadron of Sea Harriers to Australia. However the new Hawke government decided against purchasing a replacement for HMAS Melbourne.

Hermes served with the Royal Navy until 12 April 1984. On this day she entered Portsmouth with a reduced crew, under her own steam, flying the White Ensign for the final time as a seagoing ship.

=== Viraat ===
In April 1986 Hermes was towed from Portsmouth Dockyard to Devonport Dockyard to be refitted, reactivated and sold to India, recommissioning and sailing as INS Viraat in 1987.

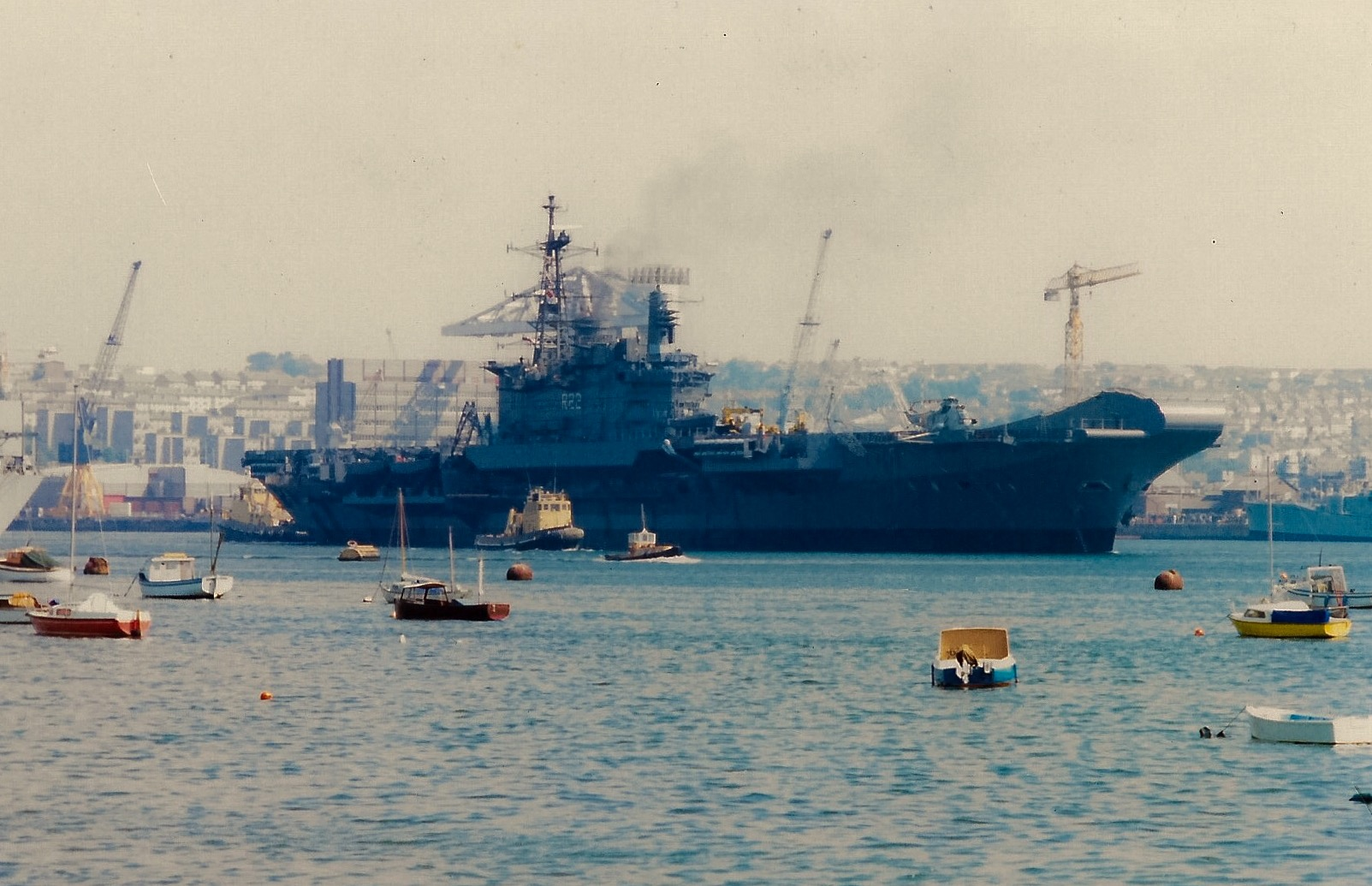
Taken from Torpoint in Cornwall, INS Viraat, is seen here leaving Devonport Dockyard for the last time as she begins the long voyage to India for service with the Indian Navy

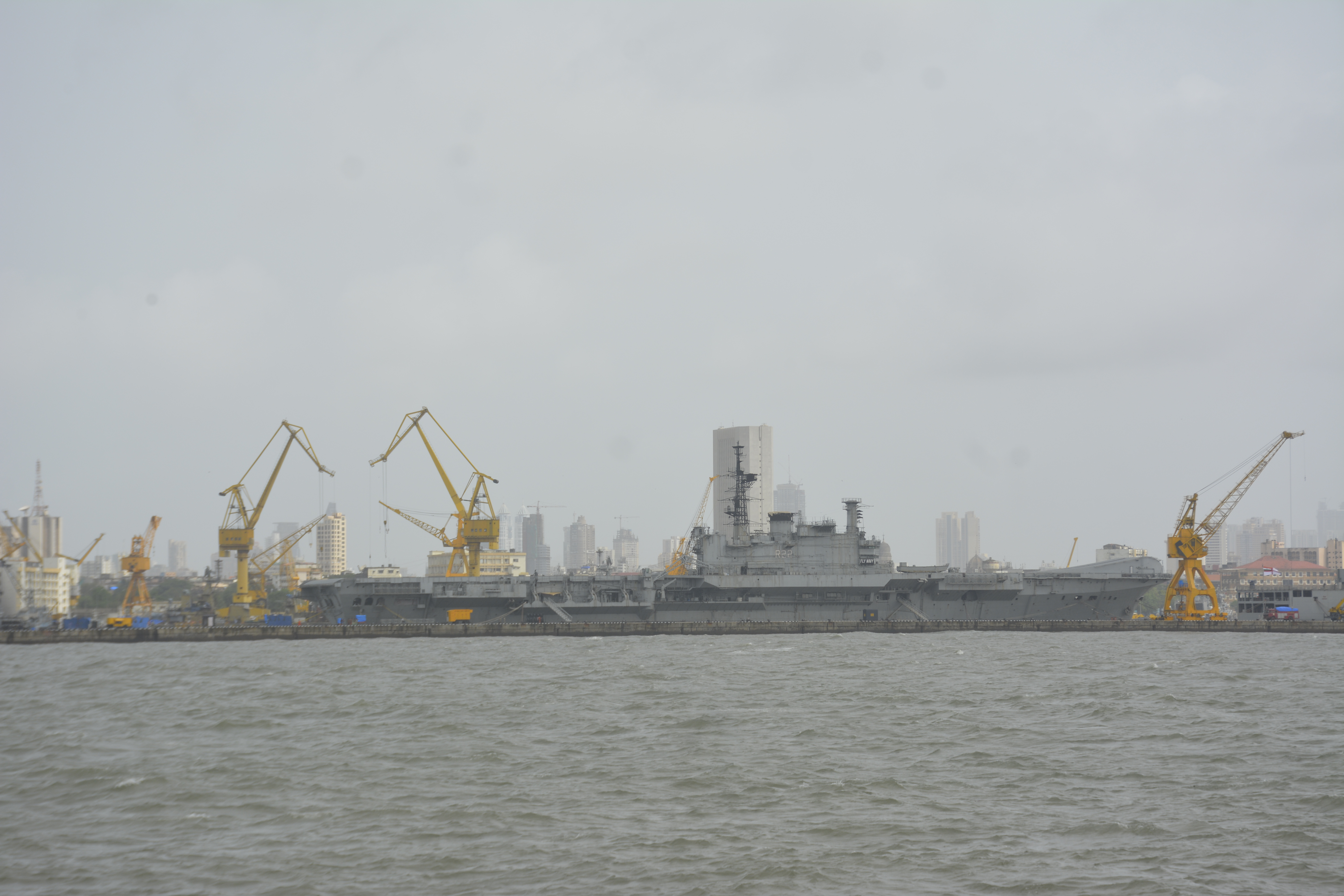
INS Viraat docked at Mumbai Naval Docks after final decommission from the service

== Complement ==
The typical aircraft complement in the late 1960s consisted of 12 Sea Vixen FAW2s, 7 Buccaneer S2s, 4 Gannet AEW3s, 1 Gannet COD4, 5 Wessex HAS3s and 1 Wessex HAS1. Hermes was recommissioned as a commando carrier in 1973, as an ASW carrier in 1976 (carrying around 20 or so Sea King and Wessex helicopters), and then as a V/STOL carrier in 1981. Hermes initial complement of aircraft as a V/STOL carrier was five Harriers and 12 Sea King helicopters, though she had the capacity for up to a total of 37 aircraft.

== Preservation attempts ==
Following her decommissioning from the Indian Navy in 2017, a crowdfunding campaign was launched to preserve Hermes as a museum piece. The campaign aimed to raise £100,000, but was only able to raise £9,303 before being declared unsuccessful.

On 1 November 2018 the Maharashtra cabinet approved the conversion of Viraat into India's first moored maritime museum and marine adventure centre. It would be located near Nivati, Sindhudurg district. On 1 July 2019 the Indian Minister of State for Defence informed the Indian Parliament that a decision to scrap Viraat had been taken due to the non-receipt of any financially self-sustaining proposal.

The ship was scrapped in a ship breakers yard in Alang, India. As of December 2020, about five per cent of the ship was already gone. The distinctive take-off ramp used by the Harrier jump jets had been removed. On 10 February 2021, the Supreme Court of India had ordered the dismantling be placed on hold, following a petition by a private firm to turn the ship into a museum, but on 12 April 2021 it dismissed the petition saying it was too late since 40% of the ship had been dismantled.

== See also ==
- Type 984 radar
