= 3D radar =

Radar ranging and direction in three dimensions

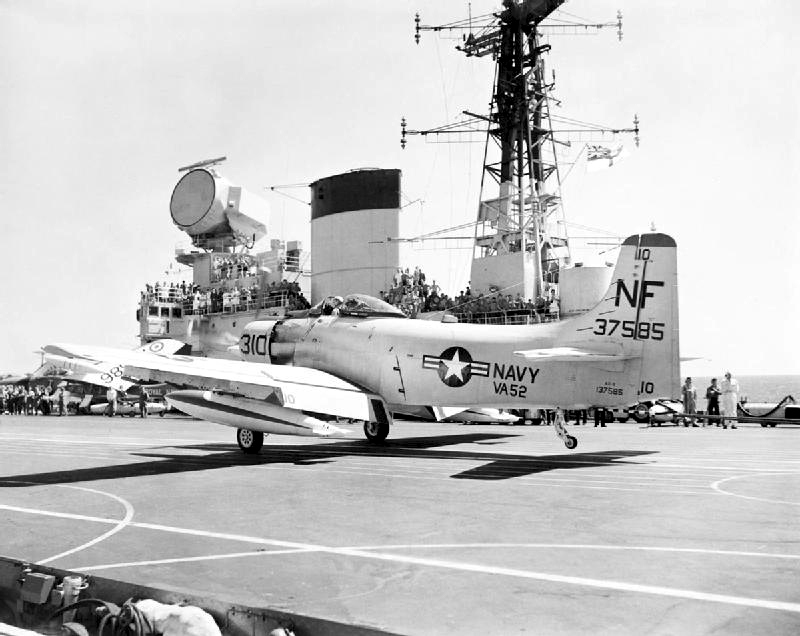
Type 984 radar on HMS Victorious, 1961

3D radar provides for radar ranging and direction in three dimensions. In addition to range, the more common two-dimensional radar provides only azimuth for direction, whereas the 3D radar also provides elevation. Applications include weather monitoring, air defense, and surveillance.

The information provided by 3D radar has long been required, particularly for air defence and interception. Interceptors must be told the altitude to climb to before making an intercept. Before the advent of single unit 3D radars, this was achieved with separate search radars (giving range and azimuth) and separate height finding radars that could examine a target to determine altitude. These had little search capability, so were directed to a particular azimuth first found by the primary search radar.

== Techniques ==
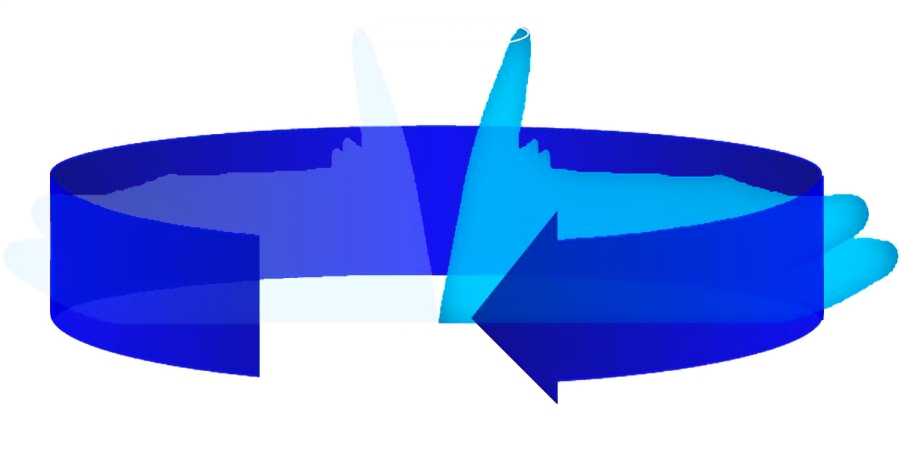
Diagram of a typical 2D radar rotating cosecant squared antenna pattern.

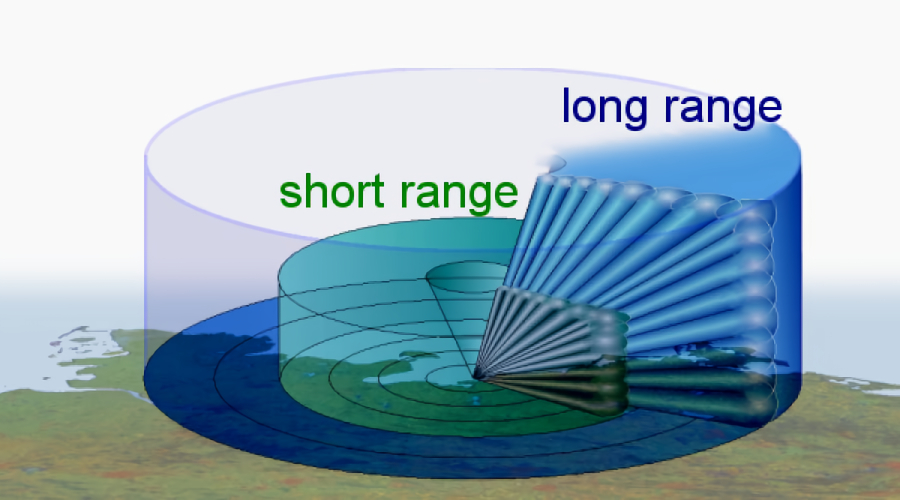
Diagram of a typical 3D radar, a judicious mix of vertical electronic beam steering and mechanically horizontal movement of a pencil-beam

Steered beam radars steer a narrow beam through a scan pattern to build a 3D picture. Examples include NEXRAD Doppler weather radar (which uses a parabolic dish) and the AN/SPY-1 passive electronically scanned array radar employed by the Ticonderoga class of guided missile cruisers and other ships so equipped with the Aegis Combat System.

Stacked beam radars emit and/or receive multiple beams of radio waves at two or more elevation angles. By comparing the relative strengths of the returns from each beam, the elevation of the target can be deduced. An example of a stacked beam radar is the Air Route Surveillance Radar.

== See also ==
- Type 984 radar, British aircraft carriers
- AN/TPS-75 US-made transportable PESA 3D air search radar
- Ghamar (3D radar)
