= HMS Victorious (R38) =

1941 Illustrious-class aircraft carrier of the Royal Navy

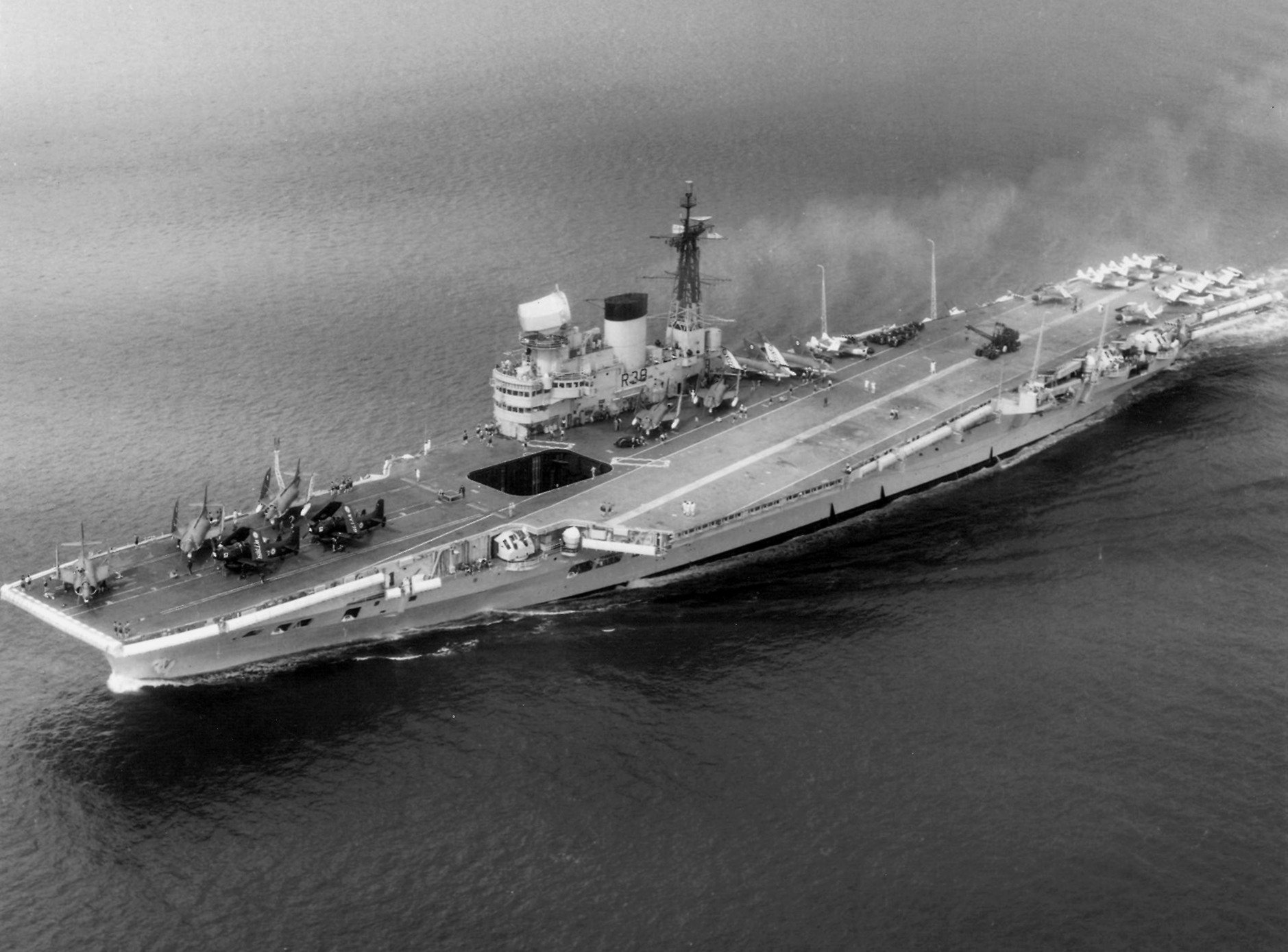
- Victorious in 1959, after her refit

History

United Kingdom
- Name: Victorious
- Ordered: 13 January 1937
- Builder: Vickers-Armstrongs
- Cost: £50 million
- Laid down: 4 May 1937
- Launched: 14 September 1939
- Commissioned: 14 May 1941
- Decommissioned: 13 March 1968
- Refit: 1950–1957
- Identification: Pennant numbers: 38, R38, 38
- Motto: Per coelum et aequorem victrix (Through air and sea victorious)
- Honours and awards: Cape of Good Hope 1795; St Lucia 1796; Egypt 1801; Walcheren 1809; Rivoli Action 1812; Bismarck Action 1941; Norway 1941–42; Arctic 1941–42; Malta Convoys 1942; Biscay 1942; Sabang 1944; Palembang 1945; Okinawa 1945; Japan 1945
- Fate: Scrapped, 1969
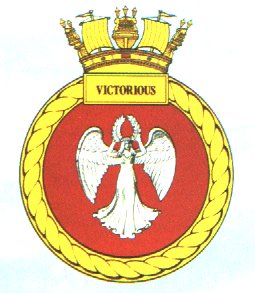
- Badge

General characteristics
- Class & type: Illustrious-class aircraft carrier
- Displacement: As built: 23,207 tons lightship, 28,619 tons full load; Post-refit: 35,500 tons full load
- Length: As built: 673 ft (205 m) waterline; 743 ft 9 in (226.70 m) overall; Post-1957 refit: 778 ft 3 in (237.21 m) overall
- Beam: (waterline) As built: 95 ft (29 m); Post-1957 refit: 103 ft (31.4 m) over bulges; (flight deck) 145 ft 9 in (44.42 m)
- Draught: (full load) As built: 28 ft (8.5 m); Post-1957 refit: 31 ft (9.45 m)
- Installed power: 6 × Admiralty 3-drum boilers; 111,000 shp (83,000 kW)
- Propulsion: 3 shafts, 3 geared steam turbines
- Speed: 30.5 knots (56.5 km/h; 35.1 mph)
- Range: 11,000 nautical miles (20,000 km; 13,000 mi) at 14 knots (26 km/h; 16 mph)
- Complement: As built: 817 (ship) + 394 (air group); post refit: 2,200 (including air group)
- Armament: 16 × 4.5 inch (8 × 2); 48 × 2-pounder (6 × 8); 21 × 40 mm AA (2 × 4, 2 × 2, 9 × 1); 45 × 20 mm AA (45 × 1)
- Armour: flight deck: 3"; hangar deck: 2"; side belt 4"; hangar sides: 4"
- Aircraft carried: During World War II: included: Albacore, Avenger, Barracuda, Corsair, Fulmar, Seafire, Sea Hurricane, Swordfish, Wildcat, F6F Hellcat; 1941: 36 Fulmar/Albacore; 1943: 52 Martlet IV/Avenger; 1945: 54 Corsair/Avenger; Post-refit aircraft included: Gannet, Scimitar, Sea Fury, Sea Hawk, Sea Vixen, Buccaneer

HMS Victorious was the third Illustrious-class aircraft carrier after Illustrious and Formidable. Ordered under the 1936 Naval Programme, she was laid down at the Vickers-Armstrongs shipyard at Newcastle upon Tyne in 1937 and launched two years later in 1939. Her commissioning was delayed until 1941 due to the greater need for escort vessels for service in the Battle of the Atlantic.

Her service in 1941 and 1942 included famous actions against the battleship Bismarck, several Arctic convoys, and Operation Pedestal. She was loaned to the United States Navy in 1943 and served in the south west Pacific as part of the Third Fleet. In 1944 Victorious contributed to several attacks on the Tirpitz. The elimination of the German naval threat allowed her redeployment first to the Eastern Fleet at Colombo and then to the Pacific for the final actions of the war against Japan.

After the war, her service was broken by periods in reserve and, between 1950 and 1958, the most complete reconstruction of any Royal Navy carrier. This involved the construction of new superstructure above the hangar deck level, a new angled flight deck, new boilers and the fitting of Type 984 radar and data links and heavy shipboard computers, able to track 50 targets and assess their priority for interrogation and interception. The reduction of Britain's naval commitment in 1967, the end of the Indonesia–Malaysia confrontation, and a fire while under refit, prompted her final withdrawal from service, three to five years early, and she was scrapped in 1969.

== Construction ==
Victorious was one of two Illustrious-class aircraft carriers ordered from Vickers-Armstrongs under the 1936 Construction Programme for the Royal Navy. (Note: The other being the lead ship of the class, Illustrious) (Note: Sources differ on the order date: Watton states 13 January 1937, Apps states 18 January 1937, and Hobbs states 13 April 1937.) The cost of the new carriers was estimated to be £2,395,000 each. Victorious was laid down at Vickers' Walker Naval Yard, Newcastle-upon-Tyne on 4 May 1937 as Admiralty Job Number J4035 and Yard number 11. Construction was slowed by the unavailability of armour plate, with Victorious launched on 14 September 1939, with Augusta Inskip, wife of Thomas Inskip, the Lord Chancellor, as sponsor. The carrier was commissioned at the shipyard on 29 March 1941, leaving Walker for Sea trials and passage to Rosyth dockyard on 16 April 1941.

== World War II ==
=== Bismarck episode ===
The first task given to the newly commissioned aircraft carrier was to ferry Hawker Hurricane fighters to Malta. 48 crated Hurricanes were loaded aboard Victorious at Rosyth on 14 May 1941, and on 15 May she sailed for Scapa Flow to join Convoy WS 8B to the Middle East. Following the sortie of the German battleship Bismarck and cruiser Prinz Eugen, Victorious, despite not being worked up and having an understrength air wing (consisting of the nine biplane Fairey Swordfish torpedo bombers of 825 Naval Air Squadron and a flight of Fairey Fulmar fighters), was ordered to take part in the hunt for Bismarck and Prinz Eugen, sailing from Scapa Flow with the battleship King George V, the battlecruiser Repulse and 4 light cruisers on the evening of 22 May.

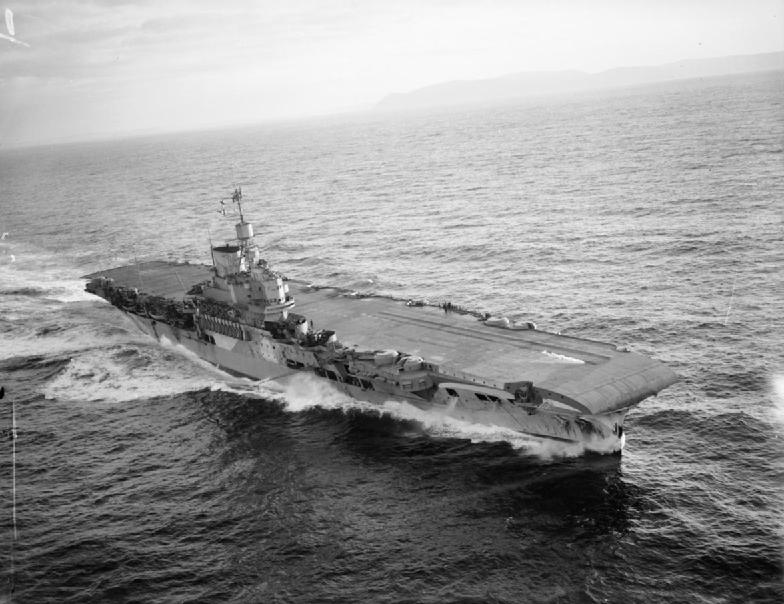
HMS Victorious in 1941

Late on 24 May 1941, Victorious launched nine of her Swordfishes, followed by three Fulmars to track the German battleship, with two more Fulmar later launched to relieve the first three Fulmars. The Swordfish, under the command of Eugene Esmonde, flew through foul weather and attacked Bismarck in the face of tremendous fire from anti-aircraft guns, scoring a hit to the 320 mm armoured belt with a torpedo. (Note: This torpedo caused minor flooding in void compartments, but the shock was substantial. Petty Officer Kurt Kirchberg was thrown against the catapult and later died from a severe head injury. Several other crewmen were injured, including several broken bones (how many is not clear in the source). Expeditions to Bismarck's wreck found the main armor belt was pushed in several centimeters due to this hit.) No aircraft were shot down during the attack, but two Fulmars ditched after they could not find the carrier in the dark because a rain squall had moved in and the carrier's homing beacon had failed. (Note: The crew of one aircraft was never found, but the two-man crew of the second was recovered by SS Ravenshill.) Victorious took no further part in the chase; aircraft from Ark Royal disabled Bismarck's steering gear, thus contributing to her sinking three days later. Esmonde received a DSO for his part in the action.

=== Convoy and other Arctic duties ===
On 31 May 1941, Victorious set out in another attempt to deliver the Hurricanes, sailing with troop convoy WS 8X. On 4 June 1941 a Swordfish of 825 Squadron from Victorious spotted the German supply ship Gonzenheim north of the Azores. Gonzenheim had been intended to support the Bismarck but was subsequently scuttled when approached by the battleship Nelson and cruiser Neptune. On 5 June, Victorious was detached to Gibraltar, where the Hurricanes were uncrated by Victorious's crew, with 20 Hurricanes transferred to Ark Royal. The two carriers left Gibraltar on 13 June to carry out Operation Tracer to deliver the Hurricanes to Malta, with 47 aircraft being launched on 14 June from a position south of the Balearic Islands. 43 Hurricanes landed safely on Malta. Victorious returned to the naval base at Scapa Flow on 19 June with 63 captured crewmen from Gonzenheim.

Victorious embarked a new air wing in early July, consisting of the Fulmar-equipped 809 Naval Air Squadron (NAS) and two squadrons (827 NAS and 828 NAS) equipped with the Fairey Albacore torpedo bomber. To provide support to the Soviet Union following the Operation Barbarossa the German invasion of the Soviet Union, the carriers Victorious and Furious were ordered to conduct Operation EF (1941) attacks on the ports of Kirkenes and Petsamo in the far north of Norway and Finland respectively. On 26 July a task force including the two carriers set out from Seyðisfjörður in Iceland. For the first part of the operation, the task force escorted the minelayer Adventure, on passage to Arkhangelsk with a cargo including mines, before leaving Adventure on 30 July. On 31 July the carriers launched their airstrikes, with Victorious launching 20 Albacores escorted by 12 Fulmars against Kirkenes, while Furious launched nine Swordfish and nine Albacores escorted by 6 Fulmars against Petsamo (now Pechanga, Russia). The attack against Kirkenes encountered heavy air opposition, with 11 Albacores and 2 Fulmars being shot down, while the attack on Petsamo lost another Albacore and two Fulmars.

During August, Victorious embarked 817 and 832 Squadrons, both equipped with Albacores to replace 827 and 828 Squadrons. From 24 to 30 August 1941, Victorious formed part of the distant escort force for the eight merchant ships of Operation Dervish, the first Arctic convoy of the war as they sailed from Iceland to Arkhangelsk, and then covered the aircraft carrier Argus which was delivering Hurricanes to Murmansk (Operation Strength). On the return journey, Victorious launched attacks on 12 September against shipping in Vestfjorden, claiming two merchant ships sunk, including the Norwegian Hurtigruten coastal steamer Barøy, and against the Glomfjord hydro-electric power plant, an aluminium factory and a radio station. No opposition was encountered. On 8 October, Victorious carried out another attack against shipping off Norway, with her Albacores damaging two merchant ships with bombs.

In November 1941, decrypted German Enigma signals indicated a break-out into the Atlantic by the German warships Admiral Scheer and Tirpitz. (Note: In fact, only Scheer was planned to sortie.) Victorious was deployed to Iceland with the battleships King George V in response, working with the American battleships USS Idaho and Mississippi, and cruisers USS Wichita and Tuscaloosa to patrol the Denmark Strait in order to intercept any breakout. While Adolf Hitler cancelled the planned sortie on 17 November, Victorious continued patrols with the Home Fleet to stop any breakout, often in very poor weather, until the end of 1941.

On 19 February 1942, Victorious left Scapa Flow in company with the battleship King George V, the cruiser Berwick and seven destroyers to attack shipping in the Tromsø region, but on 21 February an RAF Coastal Command aircraft spotted the German cruisers Admiral Scheer and Prinz Eugen on passage to Norway, and the British force was diverted to try and intercept the German ships, which turned back towards Germany on being sighted. On the night of 22/23 February Victorious launched two forces of 10 and 7 Albacores to search for and attack Scheer and Prinz Eugen but they failed to locate their targets in conditions of poor visibility. Three of the Albacores were lost during the operation. The German force was not unscathed, as Prinz Eugen was torpedoed by the British submarine Trident, sustaining damage that took months to repair.

In March 1942, the threat posed by Tirpitz, now based in Northern Norway, resulted in the Home Fleet providing a strong covering force, including Victorious, for the concurrent Arctic convoys PQ 12 (out-bound) and QP 8 (return). On 6 March 1942, Tirpitz and three destroyers sortied from Trondheim to attack the two convoys in Operation Sportpalast. On 7 March 1942, the German destroyer Friedrich Ihn encountered the Soviet freighter Izhora, a straggler from QP 8. The freighter managed to report by radio that she was under attack by a surface ship before being sunk, informing the British that a German force was at sea and near the convoys. When signals intelligence indicated that Tirpitz was heading back to Norway, Victorious was ordered to search for and attack the German battleship. Six Albacores were flown off Victorious on 0640 hr on 9 March to search for Tirpitz, followed by a strike force of 12 torpedo-armed Albacores at 0732 hr. One of the search aircraft spotted Tirpitz and directed the strike force to its target, but when the Albacores attacked, the attack was unsuccessful, with all torpedoes missing and two Albacores being shot down. In the last week of March 1942, Victorious formed part of the covering force for convoy PQ 13 and QP 9. The carrier received significant weather damage from a force 9 gale with 65 ft (20 m) waves buckling the ship's bow plating and forward bulkheads and requiring a short refit at Rosyth to repair the damage. Victorious continued to provide cover for Arctic Convoys for the rest April 1942, helping to provide cover for convoys PQ 14, and QP 10. From the end of April, until June, Anglo-American forces (including the US ships Washington, Tuscaloosa, and Wichita) covered convoys PQ 16, QP 12, PQ 17, and QP 13, after which Victorious returned to Scapa Flow.

The Arctic convoys had been suspended temporarily after the heavy losses suffered by Convoy PQ 17 when twenty-three out of thirty-six ships were sunk. This was after the convoy had been scattered in the belief that an attack was imminent by the German warships Admiral Hipper, Lützow, Admiral Scheer, and Tirpitz.

=== Pedestal ===
The suspension of the Arctic convoys released Victorious to take part in a "last chance" attempt to resupply Malta – Operation Pedestal. Malta-bound Convoy WS 21S departed Britain on 3 August 1942 escorted by Victorious with HMS Nelson and cruisers Nigeria, Kenya and Manchester. Exercises (Operation Berserk) were performed with aircraft carriers HMS Indomitable, Furious, Eagle and Argus to improve operational techniques.

Pedestal began on 10 August 1942 and involved a great array of ships in several coordinated groups; two battleships, four aircraft carriers, seven cruisers and thirty two destroyers. Some of the carriers were transporting aircraft for Malta's defence and fourteen merchant ships carried supplies. On 12 August 1942 Victorious was slightly damaged by an attack from Italian bombers. Eagle was less fortunate, being torpedoed and sunk by a German U-boat on her return journey to Gibraltar. Ultimately Pedestal was a success for the allies: supplies, including oil and reinforcing Supermarine Spitfires allowed Malta to hold out, albeit at the cost of the loss of nine merchant ships, one aircraft carrier, two cruisers, and a destroyer.

In September 1942, Victorious was taken in hand for a refit that included the installation of an aircraft direction room. After trials, she was ready to participate in the North African landings.

=== Operation Torch ===
In November 1942, Victorious took part in the North African landings. Operation Torch, which involved 196 ships of the Royal Navy and 105 of the United States Navy, landed about 107,000 Allied soldiers. Ultimately successful, Operation Torch was the precursor to the later invasions of Sicily, Italy and France. Victorious provided air cover during the landings and made air attacks at Algiers and Fort Duree. Four of her Grumman F4F Wildcat fighters landed at Blida airfield to accept its surrender.

She left for Scapa Flow on 18 November and, while en route, Fairey Albacores of 817 Squadron depth charged U-517 off Cape Finisterre. The submarine's structure was badly damaged and she was scuttled; surviving crew were rescued by HMS Opportune.

=== Service with the US Navy ===
USS Hornet was sunk and USS Enterprise was badly damaged at the Battle of the Santa Cruz Islands, leaving the United States Navy with only one fleet carrier, USS Saratoga, operational in the Pacific. In late December 1942, Victorious was loaned to the US Navy after an American plea for carrier reinforcement. Whilst in US service she was assigned the radio call sign "Robin" and was informally known as "USS Robin" tongue-in-cheek. After crossing the Atlantic from Greenock, via the Royal Naval Dockyard on the Imperial fortress colony of Bermuda, to refit in the United States at the Norfolk Navy Yard during January, 1943. Her Fairey Albacore torpedo-bombers were replaced with Grumman Avengers, requiring the arrestor wires to be strengthened. A new "7 wire" was added on an extension to the aft-end of the flight deck, which increased deck space. Victorious was also equipped with the US Navy YB-type aircraft-homing system, TBS (Talk Between Ships) system, surface- and air-search radars, a vertical plotting board, and American cypher machines. Additional 20 mm and 40 mm anti-aircraft guns were fitted, along with American Mark 51 fire-control directors. A control station was added to the hangar deck, and a new fire-suppression system for the crew spaces. Victorious passed through the Panama Canal on 14 February to operate with United States forces in the Pacific. Her crew suffered an outbreak of diphtheria and medical supplies were dropped to her by air on 21 February.

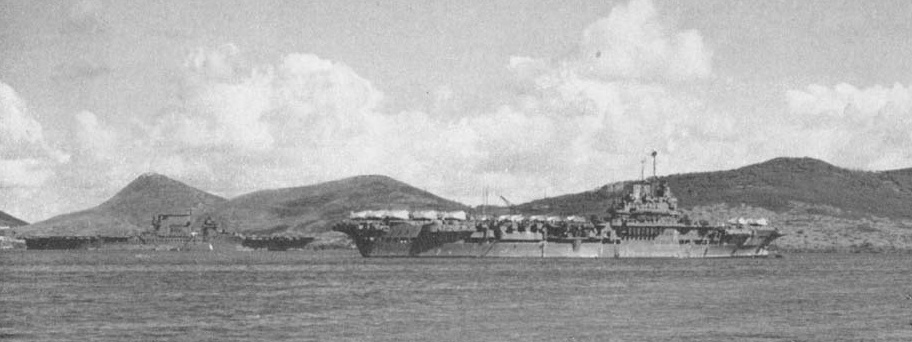
HMS Victorious and USS Saratoga at Nouméa, 1943

Victorious arrived at Pearl Harbor in March 1943 and was fitted with heavier arrester wires as RN wires had proved too light for the Grumman Avenger aircraft. Additional AA guns were also fitted. She sailed for the south-west Pacific, arriving at Nouméa, New Caledonia, on 17 May to join USS Saratoga of Rear Admiral DeWitt Ramsey’s Carrier Division 1. She sortied immediately for a week with Task Force 14, including Saratoga and battleships North Carolina, Massachusetts, and Indiana, sweeping against reported Japanese fleet activity, but without contact. Six aircraft were lost to accidents. Rear Admiral Ramsey, commanding the division, carried out evaluation exercises and patrol sweeps in June and determined that Victorious had superior fighter control but handled Avenger aircraft poorly because of their weight. Accordingly, he transferred 832 Squadron FAA to the Saratoga and US Carrier Air Group 3 to the Victorious. Thereafter, Victorious's primary role was fighter cover and Saratoga mainly handled strikes.

On 27 June, TF14 was redesignated Task Group 36.3 and sailed to provide cover for the invasion of New Georgia (part of Operation Cartwheel). Victorious spent the next 28 days continuously in combat operations at sea, a record for a British carrier, steaming 12,223 miles at an average speed over 18 knots (33 km/h; 21 mph) and launching 614 sorties. Returning to Nouméa on 25 July, Victorious was recalled home. Though the Japanese had four carriers to Ramsey's two, it seemed clear that they were not intending to press their advantage and the first two carriers of the new Essex class had arrived at Pearl Harbor well ahead of schedule. Victorious left for Pearl Harbor on 31 July, leaving behind her Avengers as replacements for Saratoga, sailing in company with battleship Indiana and launching 165 anti submarine sweeps en route. She also carried US pilots finishing their tours as well as two Japanese POWs. After a brief stop in San Diego, Victorious passed through the Panama Canal on 26 August and arrived at Norfolk Navy Yard 1 September, where specialized US equipment was removed. Returning home, she arrived at Greenock on the Clyde on 26 September 1943 where aircraft and stores were discharged awaiting refit.

The German battleship Tirpitz

=== Attack on Tirpitz ===
From December 1943 until March 1944, Victorious was under refit at Liverpool, where new radar was fitted. At the end of March, Victorious with Anson and Duke of York formed Force 1, covering the passage of Convoy JW 58. On 2 April 1944, Force 1 joined with Force 2, composed of the aging carrier HMS Furious and the escort carriers HMS Emperor, Fencer, Pursuer, and Searcher as well as numerous cruisers and destroyers. The combined force launched an attack (Operation Tungsten) on the German battleship Tirpitz in Altafjord, Norway. This involved Barracudas in two waves, hitting the battleship fourteen times and strafing the ship's defences. Although near-misses caused flooding and there was serious damage to the superstructure, the ship's armour was not penetrated. Nonetheless, the attack put Tirpitz out of action for some months. (Note: Sources differ on the time taken to repair Tirpitz, varying from one to three months. It appears, however, that she was ready for sea trials in July 1944.) The Task Force returned to Scapa Flow three days later.

Victorious was to participate in three further attacks on Tirpitz, in April and May (Operations Planet, Brawn, and Tiger Claw), but these were cancelled due to bad weather and anti-shipping strikes were substituted. On 30 May, an acoustic torpedo attack by U-957 against Victorious failed and subsequently she made more shipping attacks off Norway (Operation Lombard).

=== Eastern Fleet ===
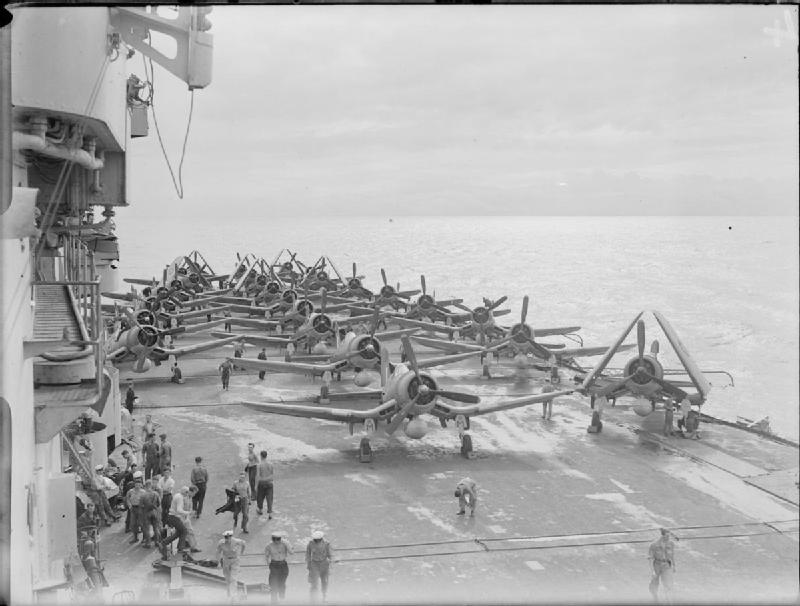
Chance Vought Corsairs being readied on Victorious' flight deck before the raid on Sigli in September 1944

In June 1944, Victorious, in company with HMS Indomitable, left British waters to join the Eastern Fleet at Colombo, Ceylon (now Sri Lanka), where she arrived on 5 July. The Eastern Fleet, after a quiet period of trade protection and relative vulnerability, was now being reinforced with ships released from the Atlantic and Mediterranean, in preparation for offensive action against the Japanese.

After a short preparatory period, Victorious took part in a sequence of air attacks against Japanese installations. The first was Operation Crimson on 25 July, a joint attack with HMS Illustrious on airfields near Sabang in Sumatra. In late August, she provided air cover for Eastern Fleet ships that were providing air-sea rescue facilities for US Army aircraft during air attacks on Sumatra (Operation Boomerang). On 29 August, in company with HMS Illustrious and Indomitable and escorted by HMS Howe, Victorious made air strikes on Padang, Indaroeng and Emmahaven (Operation Banquet). After a short pause, on 18 September, Victorious and Indomitable attacked railway yards at Sigli in Sumatra followed by photo-reconnaissance of the Nicobar Islands (Operation Light). During Light, there was a "friendly fire" attack on HMS Spirit, fortunately without causing any casualties.

At the end of September, Victorious had a short interval at Bombay for repairs to her steering gear to remedy problems that had arisen during Operation Light. She rejoined the Eastern Fleet on 6 October. The next operation, Millet, was her last with the Eastern Fleet. On 17 October, she launched attacks on the Nicobar Islands and Nancowry harbour, with HMS Indomitable and escorted by HMS Renown. Enemy air attacks destroyed four aircraft and damaged five more. During early November, Victorious returned to Bombay for more work on her steering as more problems had arisen during Millet.

=== British Pacific Fleet ===
==== Sumatra ====
The British Pacific Fleet (BPF) was formed at Trincomalee on 22 November 1944 from elements of the Eastern Fleet and Victorious was transferred to the new fleet. From November 1944 until January 1945 the BPF stayed in the Indian Ocean, training and gaining experience that they would need when working with the United States Navy. Victorious, however, remained under repair at Bombay until January 1945 and missed raids on oil refineries at Pangkalan Brandan (Operation Robson).

In early January 1945, she was available for Operation Lentil, a repeat raid on the oil refineries at Pangkalan Brandan with HM Ships Indomitable and Implacable. Further raids on Japanese oil and port installations in Sumatra were made on 16 January. By late January, the BPF had finally quit Ceylon and was en route to its new home base in Sydney. The voyage was interrupted on 24 January for another series of raids, this time on Pladjoe and Manna in south west Sumatra (Operation Meridian) during which there was little opposition from Japanese aircraft. This was followed on 29 January by unsuccessful attacks on oil installations at Soengi-Gerong. This time, the Japanese attempted air attacks on the British fleet but these were beaten off. Total aircraft losses by all carriers were 16 aircraft in action and another 25 lost by ditching or on landing. Nine Fleet Air Arm pilots captured by the Japanese were executed in April 1945.

==== Okinawa ====
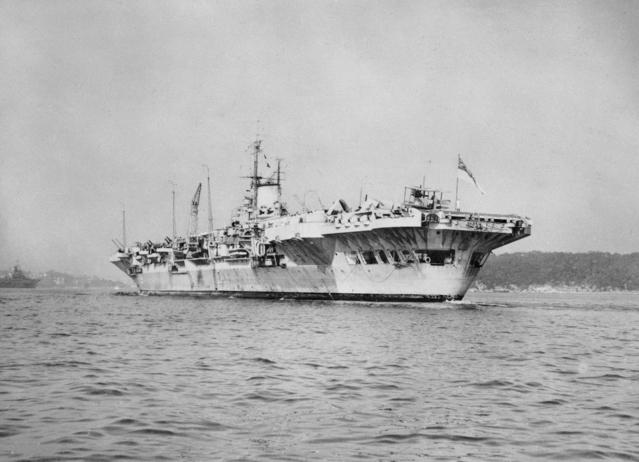
HMS Victorious and other ships of the British Pacific Fleet arriving at Sydney in February 1945

In early February, Victorious joined Task Force 113 (TF113) at Sydney to prepare for service with the US 5th Fleet. At the end of the month, TF113 left Sydney for their forward base at Manus Island, north of New Guinea, and then continued, joining the 5th US Fleet at Ulithi on 25 March as Task Force 57 (TF57), supporting the American assault on Okinawa. The task allocated to the British force was to neutralise airfields in the Sakishima Gunto. From late March until 25 May, the British carriers Victorious, Illustrious (later replaced by Formidable), Indefatigable and Indomitable formed the 1st Aircraft Carrier Squadron commanded by Vice Admiral Philip Vian and they were in action against airfields on the Sakishima Islands (Operations Iceberg I and Iceberg II) and Formosa (Operation Iceberg Oolong).

The British carriers were attacked by kamikaze suicide aircraft and Victorious was hit on 4 and 9 May and near-missed on 1 April, but her armoured flight deck resisted the worst of the impacts. She remained on station and was back in operation within hours on each occasion, despite damage to an aircraft lift and steam piping in her superstructure. Three men were killed and 19 of the ship's company were injured.

==== Japan ====
After May 1945 the British Pacific Fleet withdrew to Sydney and Manus for refits and, in the cases of Victorious, Formidable and Indefatigable, for repairs to battle damage. The British fleet rendezvoused with the US 3rd Fleet on 16 July and became effectively absorbed into the American structure as a part of TF38 for the "softening up" of Japanese resistance within their home islands.

During the second half of July, aircraft from Victorious took part in a series of attacks on Japanese shipping, transport and airbases on Honshu and around the Inland Sea. In one notable attack in July, aircraft of 849 Squadron from Victorious located the Japanese escort carrier Kaiyo at Beppu Bay in Kyūshū and attacked her, inflicting serious damage that kept the ship out of the remainder of the war. In the main, however, British aircraft were excluded from the actions against the major Japanese naval bases; the Americans, for political reasons, preferred to reserve these targets for themselves.

==== War's end ====
Victorious was scheduled to leave for Manus Island with Task Force 37 (TF37) on 10 August 1945 to prepare for the anticipated invasion of Japan (Operation Olympic), and actually left on August 12, then proceeding to Sydney. The surrender of Japan on 15 August rendered the invasion moot. The British Pacific Fleet (BPF) commander had agreed to stay for one more day's operations, but the British arrangements could not stretch to a further delay and fuel shortages were insurmountable. The steering faults that had hampered Victorious in the Indian Ocean in late 1944 are believed to have continued.

On 31 August, Victorious's ship's company took part in the Victory Parade in Sydney.

== Post-war ==
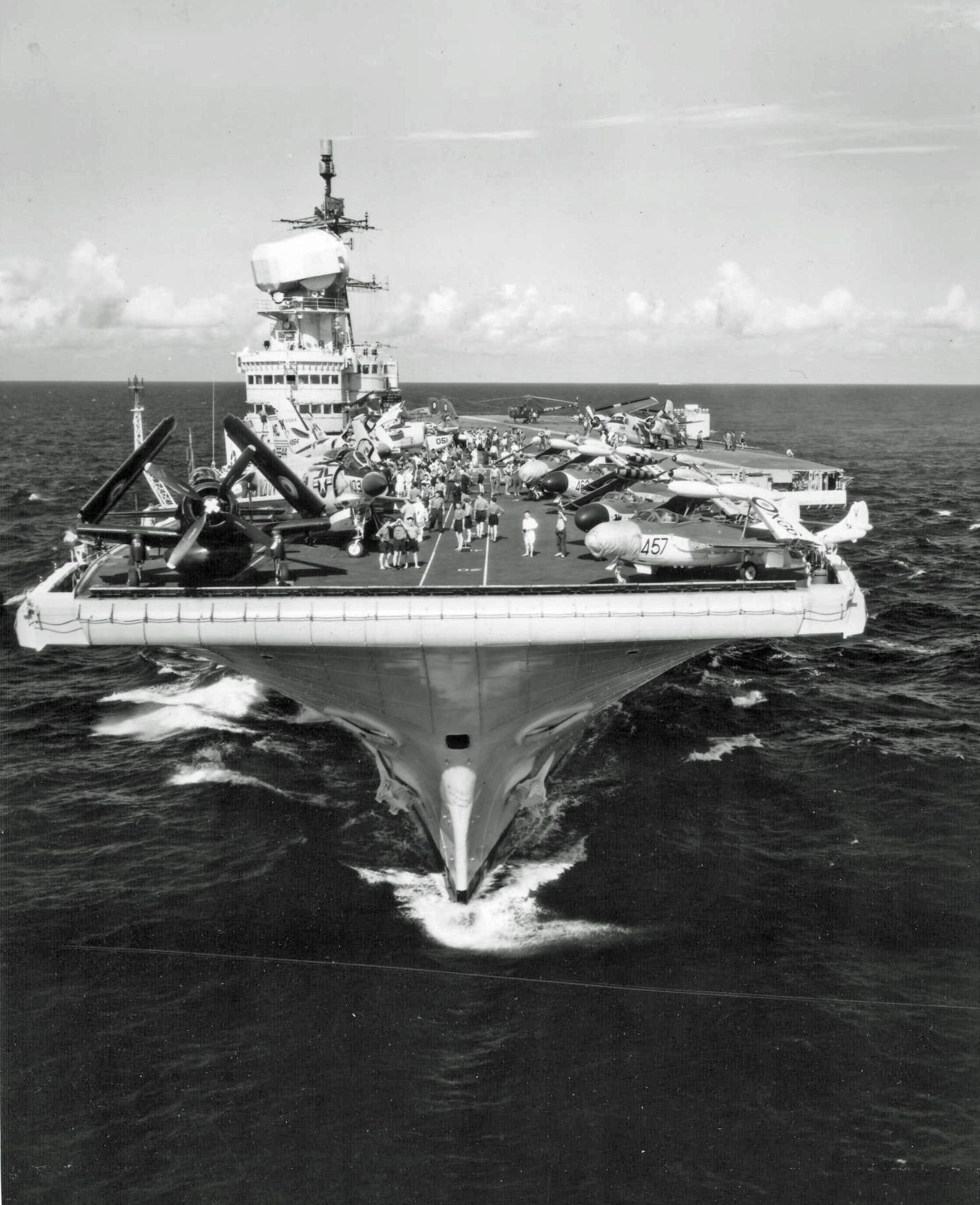
HMS Victorious in 1959 with British and U.S. Navy aircraft parked on the flight deck.

Victorious left Australia in September 1945, arrived back in Britain on 27 October and undertook three trips to collect servicemen and war brides of British servicemen from Australia and the Far East. In the winter of 1946–47, the first deck trials with the Hawker Sea Fury (Mark 10) took place aboard Victorious, leading to its approval for carrier operations in early 1947.

Victorious was reduced to the reserve at Devonport on 15 January 1947, on completion of her trooping duties. From June that year she was modified at Portsmouth Dockyard with additional accommodation and classrooms and on 1 October 1947, joined the Home Fleet Training Squadron, replacing the battleship Nelson. In July 1948, Victorious was deployed to Portland Harbour in support of the sailing events at the 1948 London Olympic Games. In 1949 she was refitted at Rosyth and took part in several training cruises and Home Fleet exercises.

== Modernisation ==
On 23 October 1950, Victorious entered Portsmouth Dockyard's D dry dock for an extensive modernization which was expected to be completed by 1954. Poor project management, frequent design changes to incorporate new technologies, and a shortage of labour at Portsmouth Dockyard all contributed to significant delays and cost increases with Victorious only leaving dock in January 1958.

The initial concept for the modernisation called for a rebuild of the hull with a single 17 ft 6 in (5.33 m) tall hangar; a new straight flight deck capable of operating aircraft up to 40,000 lb (18,000 kg); and the installation of a port side deck-edge lift forward of the crash barriers (although the deck-edge lift was eliminated as impractical even before work began). The space between the new hangar and flight deck was to be converted into a gallery deck housing machinery for the two new steam catapults mounted in the bow, accommodation spaces, and various offices and operations rooms. The entire existing armament was also planned to be replaced with a combination of QF 3-inch Mark N1 gun in Mark 6 twin mounts and 40 mm Bofors guns in Mk VI sextuple mounts. While the flight deck was to retain an armoured thickness of 3 in (76 mm), the hangar sides were only intended to be 1.5 in (38 mm) thick to offset the weight of the new gallery deck.

As work on Victorious progressed, the design quickly found itself subject to extensive revision due to both new advancements in carrier aviation such as the successful testing of the angled deck on HMS Triumph and USS Antietam, as well as issues stemming from mismanagement. One example of the latter was the 1953 discovery that the ship's original 400 psi (27 atm) Admiralty three-drum boilers were incapable of providing sufficient steam for the new steam catapults during high speed manoeuvres, and would reach the end of their practical life in 1964. As a result of this discovery, the recently completed hangar, gallery deck and armoured flight deck had to be cut open to allow the boilers and their associated equipment to be replaced with new 440 psi boilers from Foster-Wheeler, before being reinstalled again afterwards.

By the time her modernisation was finished, Victorious was in many respects a new ship, albeit one with a limited hull life. Small 4ft wide bulges had been added to her hull to improve stability, while a large sponson on the port side supported the new 8.5 degree, 775 ft (236 m) long and 145 ft (44 m) wide fully angled deck. (Note: It is sometimes incorrectly claimed that the hull was also lengthened, however no hull frames were added during the modernisation. An extended bow similar to those on the light fleet carriers and a large overhang aft did result in a longer flight deck.) The original 16 ft (4.9 m) hangar was heightened to 17 ft 6 in (5.33 m) tall with a new gallery deck placed above, while the old aircraft lifts were replaced by two new centerline lifts with a 42,000 lb (19 long tons; 19 t) capacity (Note: The forward lift was 58 ft (18 m) long by 40 ft (12 m) wide, the aft lift 54 ft (16 m) long by 34 ft (10 m) wide.). The new gallery deck fitted between the flight deck and hangar housed mess halls, the briefing and ready room, meteorological offices, and machinery for the arresting gear. The aviation magazines and ordnance support facilities were adapted to handle modern weapons such as missiles and Red Beard nuclear weapons. The old gun armament had been completely replaced with a single Mk VI sextuple 40 mm Bofors mount, and six American 3-inch /50 Mk 33 twin mountings made available through Mutual Defense Assistance Program, with a Type 293Q radar providing target indication. Her radar equipment was also extensively modernised, most prominent being the massive Type 984 3D radar on the island (the first installed on a ship) and it's associated Comprehensive Display System (CDS), which provided her with the most advanced ship-based aircraft direction system in the world at the time.

Aviation was now supported by a Type 957 TACAN beacon on top of the mast for navigation, while a Type 963 Carrier-Controlled Approach (CCA) radar on the aft of the island and the mirror landing aid on the port deck-edge (when combined with the Type 984) allowed for landings even in bad weather or at night. The two bow mounted 145 ft (44 m) stroke BS4 steam catapults were capable of launching aircraft of up to 50,000 lb (23 t) at 97 knots (relative to the deck), while the four arrester wires on the angled landing area could arrest a 35,000 lb (16 t) aircraft coming in at up to 103 knots (relative to the deck), sufficient to operate any carrier aircraft in the Fleet Air Arm at the time. While it was hoped she would be able to operate a full air group of 50 aircraft when the refit commenced, the rapid increases in size of new jets coming into service limited her to operating up to 36 aircraft (depending on type) even with the deck park in use.

The modernisation of Victorious was initially estimated to cost around 5.4 million pounds, an estimate that quickly rose to 7.7 million once work started. By 1952 costs had already risen to an estimated 11 million pounds, the boiler replacement and radar upgrades then escalated costs further to an estimated 14.16 million pounds. By the time all work had been completed in 1958, the total cost was calculated to be "a little over 30 million pounds". (Note: For comparison: Completing the larger straight decked carrier Eagle in 1951 had cost 15 million, and completing the heavily modified Centaur-class carrier Hermes in 1959 would cost 18 million.)

General characteristics after reconstruction
Displacement	30,530 tons standard, 35,500 tons deep load
Length	781 feet (238 m)
Beam	103 feet 6 inches (31.55 m) water line, 157 feet (48 m), flight deck
Draught	31 feet (9.4 m)
Machinery	3 shaft Parsons geared turbines, 6 Foster wheeler boilers
Armour	Flight deck & waterline belt 3 inches (76 mm); Hangar side & bulkheads 1.5 inches (38 mm); Otherwise as built
Armament	6 x Mk 33 twin mounts with 3 inch/50 guns; 1 x Mk VI sextuple 40 mm Bofors mount
Aircraft	Up to 36 depending on type
Radar	Type 984 3D search/tracking; Type 978 Navigation; Type 963 Carrier-Controlled Approach; Type 293Q Target indication; Type 974
Crew	2,400

== Post modernisation service ==
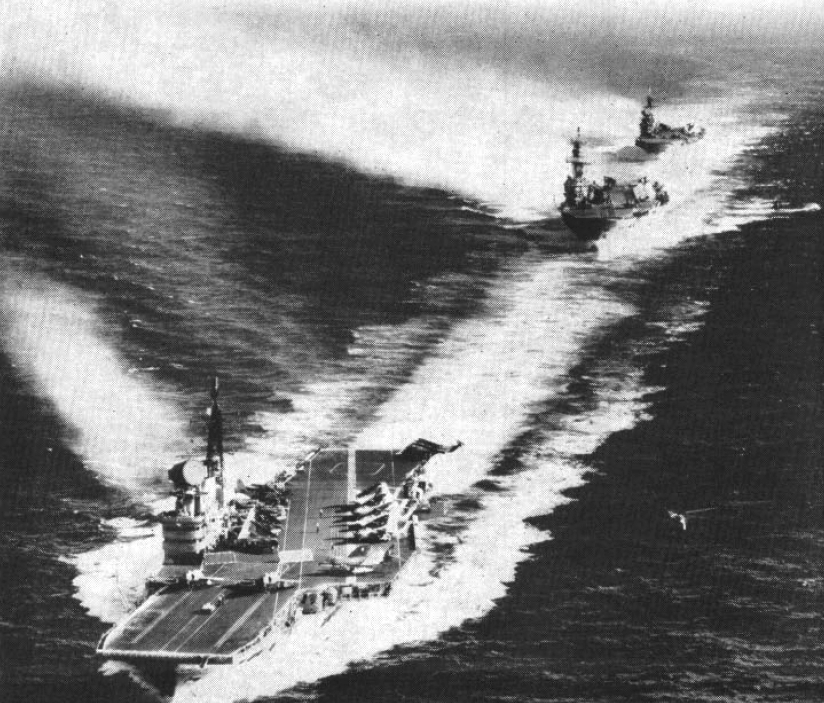
Victorious leads Ark Royal and Hermes in 1961

In 1960, after recommissioning into the Home Fleet on 14 January 1958, with work-ups and deployments in the Atlantic and Mediterranean Sea, she portrayed both herself and HMS Ark Royal during the filming of the British film Sink the Bismarck!. This was despite post-war modifications significantly altering her appearance with the addition of an angled deck and the Type 984 "searchlight" radar. The actor Kenneth More who had served aboard Victorious as a junior officer, played a fictitious Admiralty Director of Operations. He is shown giving the order to detach Victorious from Convoy WS 8B, which was forming in the River Clyde in order to move almost 20,000 troops to the Middle East.

Victorious took part in Operation Vantage in support of Kuwait in July 1961. Later in 1961 she would sail to join the Far East Fleet. In 1964, she provided support for the newly independent state of Malaysia against territorial expansion by its neighbour, Indonesia. Her passage through the Sunda Strait caused the Sunda Straits Crisis between August and September 1964, which was settled peacefully when Indonesia agreed to allow Victorious to return through the Lombok Strait. In April 1966 she departed again to serve with the Far East Fleet for a year, during which she proved capable of landing and then launching a US Navy Phantom F-4 from USS Ranger, returning to the UK for a refit period from June 1967.

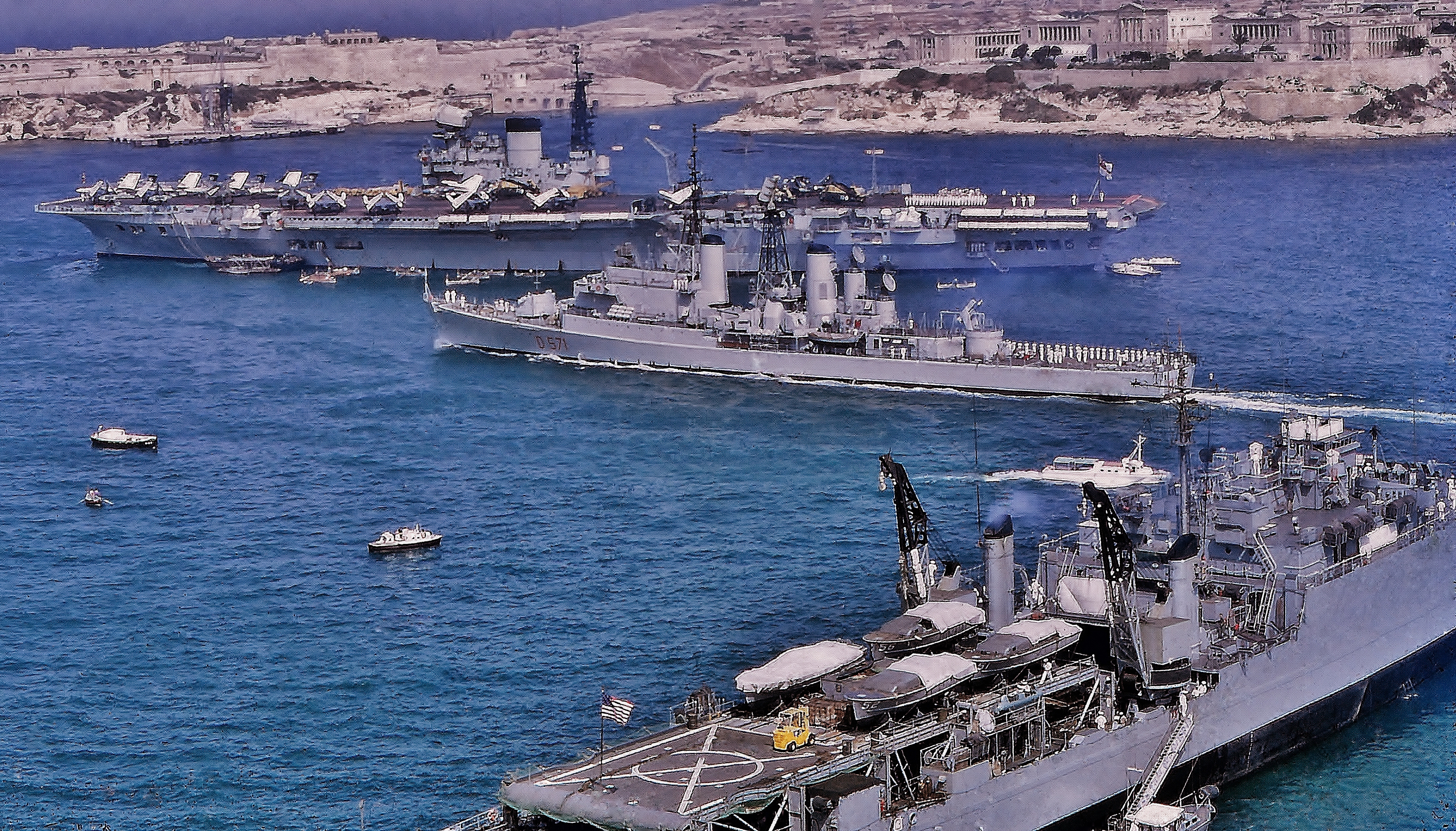
Victorious in Grand Harbour, Malta en route back to the UK following her 1966–1967 Far East cruise

=== Decommissioning ===
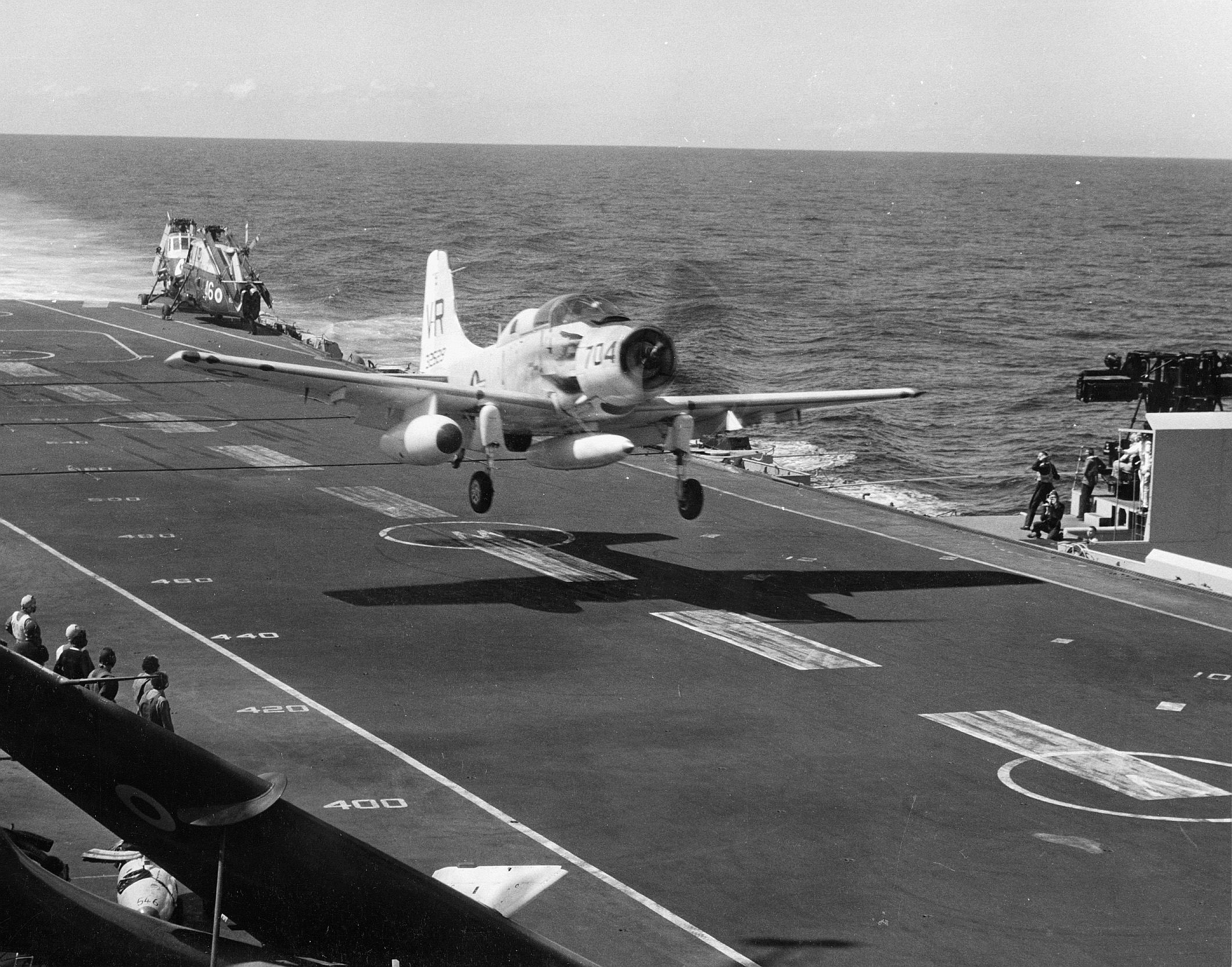
A US Navy Douglas EA-1F Skyraider (electronics countermeasures aircraft) making a touch-and-go landing on HMS Victorious in 1963

On 11 November 1967, after the completion of the 1967 refit and shortly before the start of what was intended as the ship's final commission, there was a relatively small fire, which was rapidly extinguished, in the chief petty officers' mess (resulting in one death and two hospitalisations). Although damage was relatively minor, the fire coincided with a reduction of the defence budget and a manpower shortage for the Royal Navy. Together with the 1966 decision to phase out fixed-wing naval aviation, it was decided at very short notice not to recommission Victorious. Her captain was told of this just one day before the scheduled recommissioning ceremony. The ceremony was held by the ship's crew anyway as a "wake" for the ship. She was paid off in 1968 and placed on the Disposal List in 1969. She was sold later that year to British Shipbreakers and towed on 13 July 1969 to Faslane Naval Base, where she was broken up. (Note: There are differences between sources on the precise details of the circumstances of Victorious's demise.)

Final air wing 1966–67
Squadron	Aircraft type	Number of aircraft	Role
801 NAS	Buccaneer S2	9	Strike
899 NAS	Sea Vixen FAW2	10	Fleet Air Defence
849A NAS	Gannet AEW3	4	Airborne Early Warning
849A NAS	Gannet COD4	1	Carrier On-Board Delivery
814 NAS	Wessex HAS.3	5	Anti-Submarine Warfare
Ships Flight	Wessex HAS.1	2	Search and Rescue

== Squadrons and aircraft ==
Squadrons embarked
Naval Air Squadron	Dates	Aircraft
809	January 1941 – November 1942	Fulmar II
825	May–June 1941	Swordfish I
800Z	May–June 1941	Fulmar I
820	June 1941	Swordfish I
828	July–August 1941	Albacore I
827	July–August 1941	Albacore I
820	July 1941 – January 1942	Albacore I
817	August 1941 – November 1942	Albacore I
832	August 1941 – December 1942	Albacore I
802 detachment 8	September 1941	Martlet I
885	June–August 1942	Sea Hurricane Ib
884	July–November 1942	Spitfire V
801 detachment	Aug 1942	Sea Hurricane Ib
896	September 1942 – September 1943	Martlet IV
898	October 1942 – October 1943	Martlet IV
882	October 1942 – September 1943	Martlet IV
832	January – September 1943	Avenger 1
1834	February 1944 – October 1945	Corsair II/IV
827	March–April 1944	Barracuda II
829	March–July 1944	Barracuda II
831	March–August 1944	Barracuda II
1836	March 1944 – October 1945	Corsair II/IV
1837	July–Sept 1944	Corsair II
1838	July 1944	Corsair II
822 detachment 9	September 1944	Barracuda II
849	December 1944 – October 1945	Avenger II
701C	November 1957 – July 1958	Dragonfly HR3
803	June 1958 – March 1962	Supermarine Scimitar
824	August 1958 – February 1959	Westland Whirlwind HAS7
849B	September 1958 – June 1960	Douglas Skyraider AEW1
893	September 1958 – February 1960	Sea Vixen FAW1
831B	November 1958 – December 1958	Sea Venom ECM22
894 detachment	February 1959	Sea Venom FAW22
894	June–August 1959	Sea Venom FAW22
892	July 1959 – March 1962	Sea Vixen FAW1
831B	September 1959 – December 1959	Sea Venom ECM22
831A	January 1960 – February 1960	Gannet ECM4
815	December 1961	Westland Wessex HAS1
849B	June 1960 – March 1962	Gannet AEW3
825	August 1960 – April 1962	Whirlwind HAS7
893 detachment	September 1960	Sea Vixen FAW1
819	July 1963 – August 1963	Wessex HAS1
801	August 1963 – July 1965	Buccaneer S1
814	August 1963 – June 1967	Wessex HAS1
849A	August 1963 – July 1965	Gannet AEW3
893	August 1963 – July 1965	Sea Vixen FAW1
899 detachment	August 1963	Sea Vixen FAW1
893	November 1965 – June 1967	Sea Vixen FAW2
849A	June 1966 – June 1967	Gannet AEW3
801	May 1966 – May 1968	Buccaneer S2

== Bibliography ==
- Apps, Michael (1971). Send Her Victorious. London: William Kimber & Co. ISBN 0-7183-0102-1.
- Brown, Robert (2026). "Royal Navy Fleet Carriers: Second Waorld War Battle Damage". In Jordan, John (ed.). Warship 2026. Osprey Publishing. pp. 30–47. ISBN 978-1-4728-7259-3.
- Blair, Clay (2000). Hitler's U-Boat War: The Hunters 1939–1942. London: Cassell & Co. ISBN 0-304-35260-8.
- Chesneau, Roger (1998). Aircraft Carriers of the World, 1914 to the Present: An Illustrated Encyclopedia. London: Brockhampton Press. ISBN 1-86019-87-5-9.
- Crabb, Brian James (2014). Operation Pedestal: The story of Convoy WS21S in August 1942. England: Shaun Tyas. ISBN 978-1-907730-19-1.
- Garzke, William; Dulin, Robert & Jurens, William (2019). Battleship Bismarck. Naval Institute Press. ISBN 978-1-59114-569-1.
- Hobbs, David (2013). British Aircraft Carriers: Design, Development and Service Histories. Barnsley, UK: Seaforth Publishing. ISBN 978-1-84832-138-0.
- Hobbs, David (2011). The British Pacific Fleet: The Royal Navy's Most Powerful Strike Force. Barnsley, UK: Seaforth Publishing. ISBN 978-1-5267-0283-8.
- Hobbs, David (2018). HMS Victorious: Detailed in the Original Builder's Plans. Barnsley, UK: Seaforth Publishing. ISBN 978-1-5267-3734-2.
- Hobbs, D. (December 2014). "HMS Victorious: The Highly Adaptable Carrier". Ships Monthly.
- Jenkins, C. A. (1972). HMS Furious/Aircraft Carrier 1917–1948: Part II: 1925–1948. Warship Profile. Vol. 24. Windsor, UK: Profile Publications.
- Kennedy, Ludovic (1984). Pursuit: The Chase and Sinking of the Bismarck. Bantam Books. ISBN 0-553-23795-0.
- Konstam, Angus (2018). Sink the Tirpitz 1942–44: The RAF and Fleet Air Arm Duel with Germany's Mighty Battleship. Oxford: Osprey Publishing. ISBN 978-1-4728-3159-0.
- Preston, Antony (1995). "United Kingdom". In Chumbley, Stephen (ed.). Conway's All the World's Fighting Ships 1947-1995. Annapolis, Maryland: Naval Institute Press. pp. 479–543. ISBN 1-55750-132-7.
- Rohwer, Jürgen; Hümmelchen, Gerhard (1992). Chronology of the War at Sea 1939–1945. London: Greenhill Books. ISBN 1-85367-117-7.
- Ruegg, Bob & Hague, Arnold (1993). Convoys to Russia 1941–1945. Kendal, UK: World Ship Society. ISBN 0-905617-66-5.
- Shores, Christopher; Cull, Brian & Malizia, Nicola (1987). Malta: The Hurricane Years. London: Grub Street. ISBN 0-948817-06-2.
- Sturtivant, Ray & Ballance, Theo (1994). The Squadrons of the Fleet Air Arm. Tonbridge, UK: Air Britain (Historians). ISBN 0-85130-223-8.
- Vian, Philip (1960). Action This Day. London: Frederick Muller.
- Watton, Ross (1991). The Aircraft Carrier Victorious. Anatomy of the Ship. Naval Institute Press. ISBN 1-55750-026-6.
