= 803 Naval Air Squadron =

Inactive flying squadron of the Royal Navy's Fleet Air Arm and Royal Canadian Navy

- Squadron badge
- Active: Royal Air Force: 1933–1937; 1938–1939; Royal Navy: 1939–1943; 1945–1946; Royal Canadian Navy; 1946–1951; Royal Navy: 1951–1955; 1957–1958; 1958–1966; 1967–1969
- Disbanded: 18 December 1969
- Country: United Kingdom: (1933–1946; 1951–1969); Canada (1946–1951)
- Branch: Royal Navy; Royal Canadian Navy
- Type: Single-seat fighter squadron
- Role: Carrier-based fighter squadron; Carrier-based maritime strike
- Part of: Fleet Air Arm
- Mottos: Cave Punctum (Latin for 'Beware of the sting')
- Aircraft: See Aircraft flown section for full list.
- Engagements: World War II: Norwegian campaign; Western Desert campaign; Battle of Cape Matapan; Battle of the Mediterranean; Battle of Crete
- Battle honours: North Sea 1939; Norway 1940; Libya 1940–41; Matapan 1941; Crete 1941; Mediterranean 1941–44

Insignia
- Squadron Badge Description: Barry wavy of eight white and blue, a wasp with tail inclined to profile proper (1937)
- Identification Markings: 285-295 (Osprey); A7A+ (Skua); S6A+ (Skua April 1940); A7A+ and A8A+ (Skua May 1940); 6A+ (Fulmar 6A+ October 1940-June 1941); single letters K+ (Fulmar March 1942); 7A+ (Fulmar later); single letters (Hurricane); 111-118 (Attacker); 140-154 (Attacker January 1953); 141-152 (Sea Hawk); 145-155 (Sea Hawk January 1957); 140-157 (Scimitar); 015-017, 020-027 & 030-034 (Scimitar June 1965); 610-617 (Buccaneer)
- Fin Carrier/Shore Codes: J (Attacker); C:J:E (Sea Hawk); J (Sea Hawk January 1957); V:H:R (Scimitar); R (Scimitar June 1965); LM (Buccaneer)

803 Naval Air Squadron (803 NAS), sometimes called 803 Squadron, is an inactive Fleet Air Arm (FAA) naval air squadron of the United Kingdom's Royal Navy (RN). It most recently operated the Blackburn Buccaneer S.2 carrier capable attack aircraft between January 1968 and December 1969, based at RNAS Lossiemouth (HMS Fulmar), Moray.

Initially part of the Royal Air Force (RAF), the squadron was operational on four occasions from 1933 to 1946, subsequently transitioning to a Royal Canadian Navy (RCN) squadron from 1946 to 1951. It had an additional four separate periods of activity within the Royal Navy from 1951 to 1969. Between 1933 and 1938 the squadron flew Hawker Nimrod and Hawker Osprey within the RAF. It was operating with Blackburn Skua and Blackburn Roc by the time it moved over to the Royal Navy in 1939, before re-equipping with Fairey Fulmar and later Hawker Hurricane and Hawker Sea Hurricane. During its time as part of the RCN it initially flew Supermarine Seafire but these were replaced with Hawker Sea Fury. Reformed as part of the Royal Navy it operated with Supermarine Attacker. These were followed by the Hawker Sea Hawk and later the Supermarine Scimitar.

== History ==
=== Interwar (1933–1939) ===
803 Naval Air Squadron was formed on 3 April 1933 by promoting No 405 (Fleet Fighter) Flight to the status of a squadron, with nine Hawker Ospreys. Later that month, the aircraft boarded the aircraft carrier HMS Eagle for deployment to the Far East, with RAF Kai Tak in Hong Kong serving as the primary shore base. The squadron was recommissioned at RAF Seletar, Singapore, on 27 December 1934, officially consisting of six Hawker Ospreys; however, three of these remained at RAF Kai Tak and were subsequently transferred to the aircraft carrier HMS Hermes in January 1935. Ultimately, on 1 April 1937, the squadron was disbanded while stationed in Colombo, Ceylon.

The squadron was re-established on 21 November 1938 at RAF Worthy Down, Hampshire, deriving from 'B' Flight of 800 Squadron, FAA. The unit was equipped with six Hawker Ospreys and three Hawker Nimrods. The Ospreys were retired the subsequent month upon the arrival of six Blackburn Skuas, with the Hawker Nimrods also being substituted later on. In April 1939, three Blackburn Rocs were introduced, and soon thereafter, the squadron embarked on the aircraft carrier HMS Ark Royal. The squadron was officially taken over by the Admiralty on 24 May 1939 while aboard HMS Ark Royal.

=== World War II (1939–1945) ===
At the outbreak of World War II, the Blackburn Skuas and Blackburn Rocs which formed 803 Squadron were embarked on HMS Ark Royal. Operating out of Scapa Flow, the squadron carried out anti-submarine patrols in the Northwestern Approaches, losing two Blackburn Skuas in an attack on U-30 on 14 September 1939 and regular patrols off Norway, during which the squadron shot down the first German aircraft by a British aircraft in the war, a Dornier Do 18, on 26 September 1939.

The squadron's activities continued off Norway (though leaving the Blackburn Rocs behind), operating there in April 1940 from the aircraft carrier HMS Glorious. 803 and 800 Squadrons successfully dive bombed and sank the German cruiser Königsberg at Bergen (with 800 Squadron providing five aircraft and seven crews in contrast to 803's eleven aircraft and nine crews), though an attack by 803 from HMS Ark Royal on the German battleship Scharnhorst in June was less successful, with the loss of all but two aircraft.

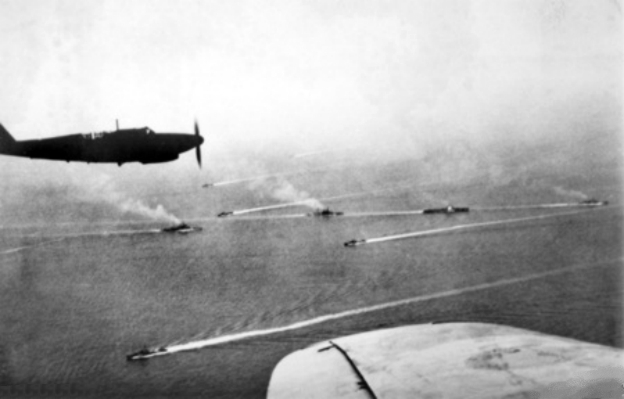
An 803 Squadron Fulmer Mk.I during the Battle of Cape Matapan, 1941.

In October 1940 803 Squadron was re-equipped with Fairey Fulmar Mk.I, a carrier-based reconnaissance/fighter aircraft, and after that served in the Eastern Mediterranean from the aircraft carrier HMS Formidable, fighting at the Battle of Cape Matapan, shooting down two aircraft and damaging two more and providing fighter cover for the Malta Convoys and the evacuation of Crete. After HMS Formidable was damaged at Crete, 803 Squadron moved to RNAS Dekheila (HMS Grebe), Alexandria, Egypt, where it was re-equipped with RAF Hawker Hurricanes and later Hawker Sea Hurricanes.

It was subsequently based in Palestine for operations against Syria from June 1941, then in August it was merged into the RN Fighter Squadron (a combined unit fighting in the Western Desert).

803 re-equipped again with Fairey Fulmar Mk II in March 1942, it next operated from Ceylon against the Japanese, such as against the Easter Sunday Raid, rejoining HMS Formidable in the Indian Ocean in April. 803 Squadron then saw operations in East Africa in 1943, before absorbing 806 Squadron for army co-operation exercises. The new combined squadron was disbanded at HMS Kilele, the Royal Naval Air Station at Tanga, Tanzania, on 12 August 1943.

803 Squadron was re-established with twenty-five Supermarine Seafire L Mk.IIIs at RNAS Arbroath (HMS Condor), located in Angus, on 15 June 1945. It was intended to be integrated into the 19th Carrier Air Group for deployment on an Implacable-class aircraft carrier; however, the occurrence of V-J Day altered these plans. In August, the aircraft were replaced to include twelve Supermarine Seafire F Mk.XVs.

=== Royal Canadian Navy (1946–1951) ===
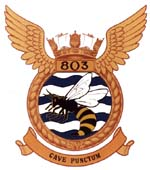
803 Squadron RCN

Upon the transfer of the aircraft carrier HMS Warrior to the Royal Canadian Navy, designated as HMCS Warrior on 24 January 1946, 803 Naval Air Squadron accompanied the carrier to its new service. Following its integration into the 19th Carrier Air Group upon the establishment of Royal Canadian Navy operations in 1947, the squadron underwent a transition to Hawker Sea Fury fighter aircraft and subsequently conducted flight operations from the Majestic-class light aircraft carrier HMCS Magnificent. The squadron underwent redesignation as 870 Squadron RCN on 1 May 1951, thereby liberating the designation "803 Squadron" for reassignment within the Royal Navy.

=== Royal Navy (1951–1969) ===
==== Attacker (1951–1954) ====
The Supermarine Attacker represented the inaugural jet fighter to be standardised within the first-line squadrons of the Fleet Air Arm. 803 Squadron reformed at RNAS Ford (HMS Peregrine), West Sussex, on 23 November 1951, receiving eight Supermarine Attacker F.1s.

Together with the 800 squadron, they constituted the 13th Carrier Air Group and were scheduled to conduct preparations at RNAS Ford in anticipation of their deployment with the Audacious-class aircraft carrier HMS Eagle.

The strength of the squadron was increased to twelve aircraft and the F.1s replaced with FB.2s following the disbandment of 890 Squadron in December 1952.

==== Sea Hawk (1954–1958) ====
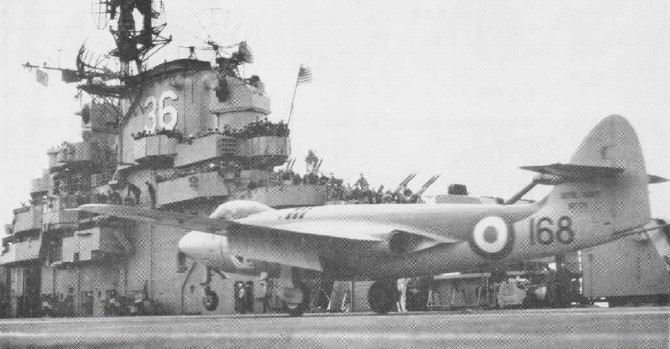
An 803 Squadron Sea Hawk on the United States Navy's Antietam in 1953.

In August 1954, the Attackers were substituted with twelve Sea Hawk FB.3s, which 803 then embarked in the Centaur-class aircraft carrier HMS Albion, subsequently moving to the name ship of her class HMS Centaur before being disbanded upon reaching HMNB Portsmouth on 4 November 1955.

The Hawker Sea Hawk was initially introduced to FAA squadrons in 1953, with the FB.3 fighter-bomber variant, which possessed reinforced wings designed to support external loads, making its inaugural flight on 13 March 1954. The ultimate production model for the Royal Navy was the FGA 6, with the final Sea Hawk for the FAA being delivered in early 1956.

On 14 January 1957, the squadron was re-established at RNAS Lossiemouth (HMS Fulmar), Moray, with ten Sea Hawk FGA.6 aircraft, which subsequently embarked in HMS Eagle in August. After spending the initial months of 1958 in the Mediterranean, including two-weeks at RNAS Hal Far (HMS Falcon), Malta, the squadron returned to its home base and was disbanded at RNAS Lossiemouth on 31 March.

==== Scimitar (1958–1966) ====
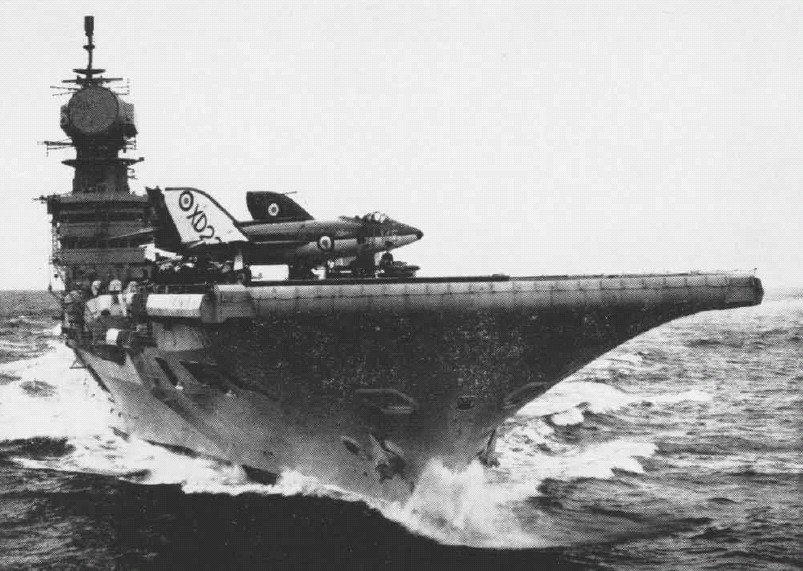
A Scimitar on the flight deck of Victorious in 1960

Re-formed at RNAS Lossiemouth on 3 June 1958, around a centre of 700X Scimitar F.1 IFTU, 803 Squadron became the first FAA operational squadron to be equipped with a nuclear-capable aircraft, when it received eight Scimitar F.1. (Eight years and five months later, it also became the last front-line FAA squadron to operate the Scimitar.) The Supermarine Scimitar was the first swept-wing, single-seat fighter introduced by the FAA, signifying a notable progression as the initial aircraft within the FAA to reach supersonic velocities. Furthermore, it was the first aircraft utilised by the FAA that had the ability to use a tactical nuclear weapon.

In July, the squadron welcomed the First Sea Lord and showcased aerial displays at RNAS Eglinton (HMS Gannet), County Londonderry and the Society of British Aerospace Companies (SBAC) exhibition in Farnborough, Hampshire. After weapons training, the squadron deployed aboard the newly re-built Illustrious-class aircraft carrier HMS Victorious at month's end and remained attached to her air group for the next two years. Unfortunately, the commanding officer was lost when the arrester wire failed, leading to a fatal crash. The carrier then proceeded to the Mediterranean for exercises off Gibraltar, the squadron disembarking to RNAS Hal Far (HMS Falcon), Malta, on 8 November.

HMS Victorious departed for the UK in early January 1959 but returned mid-February with 803 embarked and conducted exercises in the Western Mediterranean. The carrier took part in exercise Dawn Breeze 4 in March. In May the squadron re-embarked in HMS Victorious and the carrier made several visits to UK and European bases, including a royal visit from King Olaf of Norway on 18 June. In July, the carrier visited various US locations, returning home in August. After re-embarking in September, the squadron spent the rest of the year visiting Norway, Gibraltar, Malta, and Marseille, participating in joint exercises with Royal Air Force (RAF) Canberra aircraft and the United States Navy's USS Saratoga. 803 returned to RNAS Lossiemouth in December.

During the majority of 1960, the squadron was stationed at RNAS Lossiemouth, although it did embark in HMS Victorious for training exercises. The squadron did not re-embark in HMS Victorious until October, when it made visits to Gibraltar, Malta, and Naples, Italy, as well as participated in the exercises known as Royal Flush and Pink Gin. The squadron disembarking to RNAS Lossiemouth in December.

In January 1961, HMS Victorious began a ten-month deployment to the Far East, reaching Cape Town, South Africa, by February, it visited Aden, Yemen, from March 11 to 18, Singapore from April 4 to 17, and Pulau Tioman before participating in exercise Pony Express. In May, 803 disembarked to RAAF Butterworth in Borneo while the carrier docked in Singapore. Due to rising tensions in the Persian Gulf, the carrier was deployed to the Kuwaiti coast, as part of Operation Vantage in July, where 803 operated from local airfields as Iraq escalated its aggression, marking their closest approach to combat. In July HMS Victorious left the Gulf, stopping in Mombasa and Aden before returning to Singapore, where the squadron disembarked to RAF Tengah on September 14. By October, 803 Squadron rejoined the carrier for an exercise with the United States Navy's USS Ticonderoga aircraft carrier in the Philippines. HMS Victorious returned to Singapore in early November and then salied for an exercise off Malta. The squadron left the carrier near Sardinia in December and flew back to RNAS Lossiemouth via RNAS Yeovilton (HMS Heron), Somerset, for Christmas.

The squadron's last deployment on HMS Victorious began on 5 February 1962, visiting Brest from 15 to 19 February, then Gibraltar, and Vigo, Spain, from 17 to 22 March. After an exercise, the carrier returned to the UK, the squadron disembarking to RNAS Lossiemouth on 2 April.

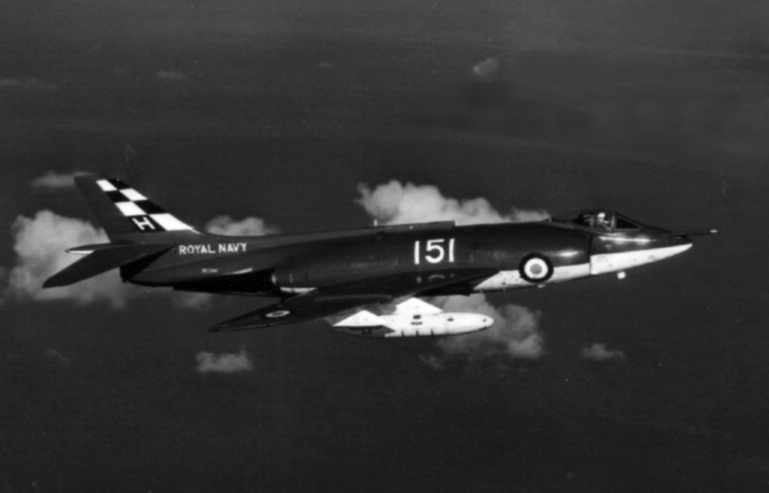
An 803 Squadron Scimitar F.1 from Hermes.

In April, 803 Squadron conducted deck trials on the Centaur-class light fleet carrier HMS Hermes and re-embarked in May for the Mediterranean and arrived at Gibraltar in July. 803 re-embarked for exercises with the United States Navy's aircraft carriers USS Enterprise and USS Forrestal. HMS Hermes visited Lisbon, Portugal and Palma, Mallorca, in August before returning to Malta for exercises with the French Navy. In October, the carrier departed for the UK, with the Scimitars heading to RNAS Lossiemouth. 803 re-embarked on 13 for another Far East tour, stopping at Gibraltar, transiting the Suez Canal, and visiting Aden in early December before reaching Singapore on 21. The carrier left Singapore in January 1963, with 803 embarked for Far East exercises. After exercises, five aircraft were disembarked at RNAS Yeovilton. In September 803 rejoined HMS Hermes and was later deployed to the Mediterranean, returning to the UK where the squadron disembarked to RNAS Lossiemouth in October.

In 1964, 803 mainly operated from RNAS Lossiemouth or RNAS Yeovilton, with brief sea intervals. In February it increased to sixteen Scimitars with aircraft absorbed from the disbanded 800 Squadron. In May and the squadron took part in the FAA Jubilee Review at RNAS Yeovilton on 28. It was also set to participate in the SBAC show and conducted deck landing practice on the Audacious-class aircraft carrier HMS Ark Royal in early December. The squadron embarked in HMS Ark Royal in January 1965, for training in February and March. They returned to RNAS Lossiemouth in March, then re-embarked before the carrier's June departure for the Far East. The carrier crossed the Suez Canal and arrived in Aden on 2 July, continuing to Singapore via Penang. After exercises with USS warships, HMS Ark Royal returned to Singapore, and the squadron disembarked at RAF Changi before moving to RAAF Butterworth and the squadron returned to RAF Changi in November. They re-embarked in early December and spent Christmas in Fremantle, Australia.

HMS Ark Royal returned to Singapore at New Year, with the squadron disembarking to RAF Changi. HMS Ark Royal next relieved HMS Eagle for Beira Patrols and was succeeded by HMS Victorious on 25 May. On her return to the UK, HMS Ark Royal made the last British carrier visit to Aden and transited the Suez Canal in June before 803 Squadron disembarked and returned to RNAS Lossiemouth. The squadron's concluding tour aboard HMS Ark Royal commenced on 2 August with an exercise near Norway, which was succeeded by a visit to Oslo, and ultimately returned to Portsmouth to participate in the Navy Day celebration. On 20 September, the Queen Mother visited the squadron on the carrier, after which the squadron disembarked and was officially disbanded on 1 October 1966.

The squadron's Scimitars were transferred to RNAS Brawdy, Pembrokeshire. There, they were overhauled, before flying to Airwork, at Hurn. Subsequently, many appeared went on static display in various parts of the UK.

==== Buccaneer (1967–1969) ====
803 Squadron was re-established at RNAS Lossiemouth on 3 July 1967, serving as the Buccaneer Headquarters squadron. Initially equipped with Blackburn Buccaneer S.1, it received S.2 from January 1968. Fitted with a pair of Rolls-Royce Spey Mk.101 turbojet engines, the Buccaneer S.2 realised a 30 percent enhancement in thrust over the S.1, while simultaneously decreasing fuel consumption, which led to an increased operational range. Significantly, on 4 October 1965, a Buccaneer S.2 completed the inaugural non-stop transatlantic flight by an aircraft of the Fleet Air Arm.

As the Headquarters Squadron, 803 NAS participated in the continuous testing of innovative weapons and avionics. The initial phase of these trials commenced with the evaluation of air-to-air TACAN for refuelling rendezvous, a system that was subsequently adopted widely by the Royal Air Force. Additionally, the squadron conducted tests on a variety of weapons, with two of the concluding assignments involving the assessment of Lepus flares and the deployment of the '600lb Shape' - a dummy WE.177 nuclear weapon that was accurately weighted and balanced.

A contingent of four aircraft departed through Nicosia, Masirah, and Gan to reach Malaysia, where they joined HMS Hermes in the Indian Ocean. They returned in August 1968, utilising air-to-air refuelling with Handley Page Victor tankers from No. 55 Squadron RAF. Ultimately, the squadron was disbanded on 18 December 1969, following a government decision to scale-down the British carrier force and her aircraft were transferred to the RAF.

== Aircraft flown ==
The squadron has operated a number of different aircraft types when under the command of the Royal Air Force, Royal Navy, and briefly the Royal Canadian Navy, including:

=== Royal Air Force ===
- Hawker Osprey I biplane fighter and reconnaissance aircraft (April 1933 - April 1937)
- Hawker Osprey III biplane fighter and reconnaissance aircraft (November - December 1938)
- Hawker Osprey IV biplane fighter and reconnaissance aircraft (November - December 1938)
- Hawker Nimrod I biplane fighter aircraft (November - December 1938)
- Hawker Nimrod II biplane fighter aircraft (November - December 1938)

=== Royal Navy ===
- Blackburn Skua Mk.II fighter-bomber (December 1938 - October 1940)
- Blackburn Roc Mk.I fighter aircraft (April 1939 - April 1940)
- Fairey Fulmar Mk.I fighter/reconnaissance aircraft (October 1940 - June 1941)
- Hawker Hurricane Mk I fighter aircraft (June 1941 - March 1942)
- Fairy Fulmar Mk.II fighter/reconnaissance aircraft (March 1942 - August 1943)
- Hawker Sea Hurricane fighter aircraft (June - August 1942)
- Supermarine Attacker F.1 jet fighter (November 1951 - January 1953)
- Supermarine Attacker FB.2 jet fighter-bomber (December 1952 - September 1954)
- Hawker Sea Hawk FB 3 jet fighter-bomber (August 1954 - November 1955)
- Hawker Sea Hawk FGA 6 jet fighter/ground attack aircraft (January 1957 - March 1958)
- Supermarine Scimitar F.1 jet fighter (June 1958 - October 1966)
- Hawker Hunter T.8 jet trainer (May - July 1960)
- Blackburn Buccaneer S.1 jet attack aircraft (July 1967 - August 1968)
- Blackburn Buccaneer S.2 jet attack aircraft (January 1968 - December 1969)

=== Royal Canadian Navy ===
- Supermarine Seafire F Mk.III fighter aircraft (June - December 1945)
- Supermarine Seafire F Mk.XV fighter aircraft (August 1945 - July 1947)
- Hawker Sea Fury F.10 fighter aircraft (August 1947 - February 1950)
- Hawker Sea Fury FB.11 fighter-bomber (February 1948 - May 1951)

== Battle honours ==
The battle honours awarded to 803 Naval Air Squadron are:

- North Sea 1939
- Norway 1940
- Libya 1940–41
- Matapan 1941
- Mediterranean 1941
- Crete 1941

== Assignments ==
803 Naval Air Squadron was assigned as needed to form part of a number of larger units:

- 13th Carrier Air Group (November 1951 - December 1952)

== Commanding officers ==
List of commanding officers of 803 Naval Air Squadron, with date of appointment:

1933–1937

- Flight Lieutenant L. Young, RAF, from 3 April 1933
- Lieutenant Commander R.R. Graham, RN, (Squadron Leader, RAF), from 24 October 1933
- Lieutenant Commander C.W. Bras, RN, (Squadron Leader, RAF), from 27 December 1934 (Commander 31 December 1936)
- disbanded - 1 April 1937

1938–1943

- Lieutenant Commander B.H.M. Kendall, RN, (Squadron Leader, RAF), from 21 November 1938
- Lieutenant Commander D.R.F. Cambell, RN, (Flight Lieutenant, RAF), from 2 March 1939
- Lieutenant W.P. Lucy, RN, from 8 February 1940 (KIA 14 May 1940)
- Captain L.A. Harris, RM, from 15 May 1940
- Lieutenant Commander J. Casson, RN, from 23 May 1940 (PoW 13 June 1940)
- Lieutenant J.M. Bruch, RN, from 16 June 1940
- Lieutenant Commander J.M. Wintour, RN, from 16 October 1940
- Lieutenant J.M. Beuen, RN, from 4 November 1940
- Lieutenant D.C.E.F. Gibson, DSC, RN, from 20 July 1941
- Lieutenant B.S. McEwen, RN, from 10 October 1941
- Lieutenant W.L. Irving, RN, from 1 August 1942
- Lieutenant Commander(A) B.F. Cox, RNVR, from 7 October 1942
- disbanded - 12 August 1943

1951–1955

- Lieutenant Commander T.D. Handley, RN, from 23 November 1951
- Lieutenant Commander J.M. Glaser, DSC, RN, from 12 January 1953 (KiFA 19 May 1953)
- Lieutenant Commander W.D.D. MacDonald, RN, from 20 May 1953
- Lieutenant Commander J.S. Bailey, OBE, DSC, RN, 4 June 1953
- Lieutenant Commander T.G. Innes, AFC, RN, from 2 June 1954
- disbanded - 4 November 1955

1957–1958

- Commander J.O. Roberts, RN, from 14 January 1957
- disbanded - 31 March 1958

1958–1966

- Commander J.D. Russell, RN, from 3 June 1958 (KiFA 25 September 1958)
- Lieutenant Commander G.R. Higgs, RN, from 26 September 1958
- Lieutenant Commander A.J. Leahy, MBE, DSC, RN, from 14 December 1959
- Lieutenant Commander T.C.S. Leece, RN, from 18 December 1960
- Lieutenant Commander N.J.P. Mills, RN, from 1 August 1962
- Lieutenant Commander P.G. Newman, RN, from 4 May 1964
- Lieutenant Commander J. Worth, RN, from 14 June 1965
- disbanded - 1 October 1966

1967–1969

- Lieutenant Commander M.J.A. Homblower, RN, from 3 July 1967
- Lieutenant Commander G.B. Hoddinor, RN, from 26 February 1968
- Lieutenant Commander R. Wren, RN, from 23 May 1969
- disbanded - 18 December 1969

Notes: Abbreviation (A) signifies Air Branch of the RN or RNVR. Does not include Royal Canadian Navy.

== See also ==
- Edward Anson (Royal Navy officer) - Royal Navy Vice-Admiral and former 803 Squadron Scimitar pilot
- Exercise Strikeback

== Sources ==
- Fleet Air Arm 803 Squadron
- Squadron history
- FAA Buccaneer Association
