= 890 Naval Air Squadron =

Inactive flying squadron of the Royal Navy's Fleet Air Arm

- Squadron badge
- Active: 1942–1944; 1952; 1954–1955; 1956; 1960–1966; 1967–1971
- Disbanded: 6 August 1971
- Country: United Kingdom
- Branch: Royal Navy
- Type: Single-seat fighter squadron
- Role: Carrier-based fighter squadron
- Part of: Fleet Air Arm
- Home station: See Naval air stations section for full list.
- Mottos: Caelum verrimus (Latin for 'We sweep the sky')
- Aircraft: See Aircraft operated section for full list.
- Engagements: World War II: Operation Avalanche
- Battle honours: Salerno 1943

Commanders
- Notable commanders: Lieutenant Commander J.W. Sleigh, DSC, RN; Lieutenant Commander W.R. Hart, AFC, RN

Insignia
- Squadron Badge Description: White, issuant from water barry wavy blue and white a demi-knight in armour and winged helmet facing sinister grasping in his hands a broom dexter bend proper a chief wavy blue (1943)
- Identification Markings: individual letters (Martlet/Wildcat); 105-119, 141-147 (Attacker); 200-208 (Sea Venom FAW.20); 350-356 (Sea Venom FAW.21); 240-254 (Sea Vixen); 001-104 (Sea Vixen June 1965); 750-755 (Sea Vixen August 1967); 701-706 (Sea Vixen January 1971)
- Fin Carrier/Shore Codes: J (Attacker); VL:Z (Sea Venom FAW.20); O (Sea Venom FAW.21); H:R (Sea Vixen); R (Sea Vixen June 1965); VL (Sea Vixen from August 1967)

890 Naval Air Squadron (890 NAS), sometimes known as 890 Squadron, was a Fleet Air Arm (FAA) naval air squadron of the United Kingdom’s Royal Navy (RN). It most recently operated de Havilland Sea Vixen carrier-based fleet air-defence fighter aircraft between August 1967 and August 1971.

The squadron was formed in June 1942 in Nova Scotia as a fighter unit and did not receive aircraft until it reached Norfolk, Virginia, in June. There, it obtained ex-USN F4F-3 Wildcats and later exchanged for Grumman Martlet Mk IV before boarding HMS Battler on December 8 for a trip to the UK, arriving in January 1943. After incorporating 'A' Flight from 881 Naval Air Squadron, it joined HMS Illustrious in June for operations in Iceland and Norway, later supporting the Salerno landings in September 1943, before disbanding in Puttalam, Ceylon, in August 1944.

In March 1952, the squadron came together at HMS Peregrine, RNAS Ford, as a fighter unit and was officially commissioned on April 22. Operating with Supermarine Attacker, its primary role was to supply pilots and aircraft to 800 and 803 Naval Air Squadrons. In October, but was disbanded in December.

890 Naval Air Squadron was reformed in March 1954 as an All Weather Fighter squadron, with de Havilland Sea Venom and joined HMS Albion in July 1955. However, it was moved to second-line status in October and became 766 Naval Air Squadron. It was reformed again in February 1956 with de Havilland Sea Venom. It disbanded into 893 Naval Air Squadron in June after losing two crews in accidents.

The squadron reformed in February 1960 with de Havilland Sea Vixen, joining HMS Hermes in July for operations in the Mediterranean and Far East, returning in May 1961. In November, the squadron moved to HMS Ark Royal for more Mediterranean operations, returning home in early 1962 before heading back to the Far East, visiting Australia in August and arriving in the UK for Christmas. The squadron reformed again in August 1967 with de Havilland Sea Vixen and eventually disbanded in August 1971 after absorbing aircraft from 766 Naval Air Squadron.

== History ==
=== Single-seat fighter squadron (1942–1944) ===
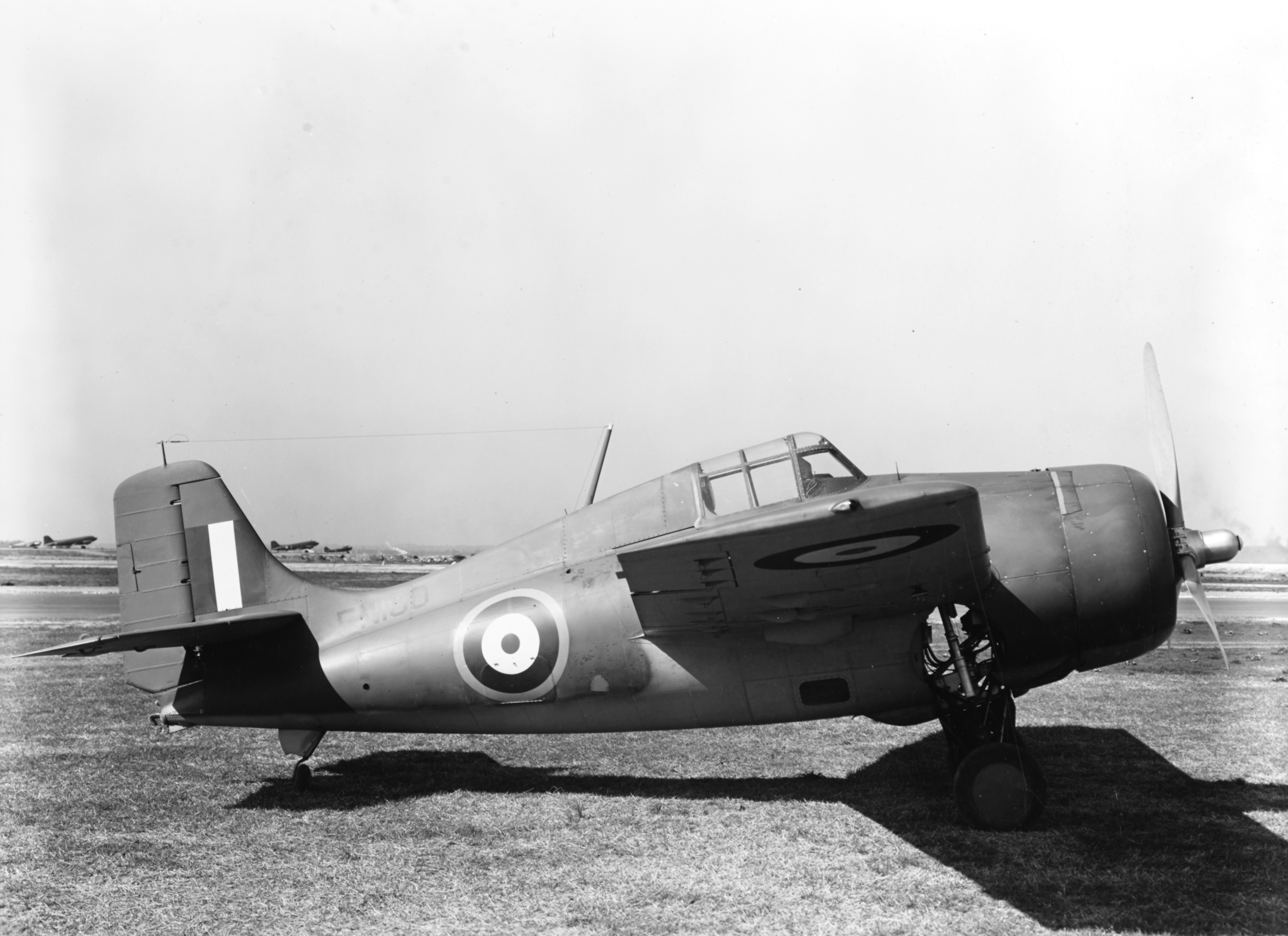
Grumman Martlet Mk.IV; an example of the type used by 890 Squadron

890 Naval Air Squadron was formed on 15 June 1942, at RCAF Station Dartmouth, Shearwater, Nova Scotia, Canada, as a fighter squadron. However, it did not receive any aircraft until it arrived at RN Air Section Norfolk, situated at Naval Station Norfolk, Virginia, United States, on 26 June, where it acquired former United States Navy F4F-3 Wildcat fighter aircraft. Following this acquisition, the squadron underwent deck landing training on the USS Charger in late August 1942. In September 1942, the squadron was further equipped with six Grumman Martlet Mk. IV fighter aircraft, enhancing its operational capabilities. This addition marked a significant step in the squadron's development as it prepared for deployment. On 8 December, 890 Naval Air Squadron embarked in the Attacker-class escort carrier, HMS Battler, for the United Kingdom.

On 8 December 1942, HMS Battler commenced the process of embarking 890 Squadron to transport them back to the United Kingdom. The carrier reached New York on 18 December and subsequently set sail on 21 December to join the convoy HX 220, which was gathering off the coast of New York. After enduring a tumultuous crossing of the Atlantic, HMS Battler finally arrived in the Clyde on 8 January 1943.

On 8 January 1943, the squadron disembarked to RNAS Machrihanish (HMS Landrail), Argyll and Bute, Scotland and then subsequently moved to RNAS Donibristle (HMS Merlin), Fife, Scotland, where it expanded by incorporating 'A' Flight from 881 Naval Air Squadron. This newly augmented squadron embarked on the name ship of her class, the aircraft carrier HMS Illustrious on 14 June, to participate in operations in the waters surrounding Iceland and Norway. Following its initial engagements, the squadron became part of Force H in the Mediterranean. It played a crucial role in providing air support during the Salerno landings in September 1943, contributing significantly to the Allied efforts in that operation. Upon their return to the United Kingdom, the squadron was re-equipped with ten Grumman Wildcat Mk V fighter aircraft and personnel subsequently boarded HMS London for transportation to Ceylon. The squadron ultimately disbanded at RNAS Puttalam (HMS Rajaliya), Puttalam, Ceylon, on 1 August 1944.

=== Single-seat fighter squadron (1952) ===
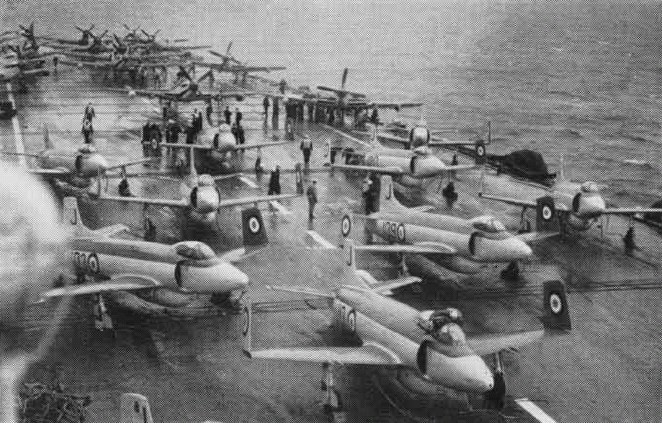
HMS Eagle, with Supermarine Attacker aircraft

In March 1952, the squadron convened at RNAS Ford (HMS Peregrine), Sussex, initially functioning as a fighter squadron. It was officially commissioned on 22 April, equipped with eight Supermarine Attacker F.1 jet fighter aircraft, primarily tasked with supplying pilots and aircraft to 800 and 803 Naval Air Squadrons. In October, the squadron was deployed aboard the Audacious-class aircraft carrier, HMS Eagle; however, it was disbanded upon returning to RNAS Ford in December, with its aircraft redistributed to the other two squadrons.

=== Sea Venom (1954–1956) ===
In the 1950s, the squadron was operational on two separate occasions, and on each instance, it was equipped with de Havilland Sea Venom fighter aircraft. 890 Naval Air Squadron was re-established at RNAS Yeovilton (HMS Heron), Somerset, in March 1954, designated as an All Weather Fighter squadron. Initially equipped with nine de Havilland Sea Venom FAW.20 fighter aircraft, the squadron embarked on the Centaur-class aircraft carrier, HMS Albion, in July 1955. However, by October of the same year, it was downgraded to second-line status and subsequently reclassified as 766 Naval Air Squadron. In February 1956, 890 Naval Air Squadron reformed at RNAS Yeovilton, this time being equipped with six de Havilland Sea Venom FAW.21 fighter aircraft. However, the squadron was disbanded in June 1956 following the tragic loss of two of its crews, which included the Commanding Officer, due to accidents.

=== Sea Vixen (1960–1971) ===
The squadron reformed at RNAS Yeovilton in February 1960, equipped with ten de Havilland Sea Vixen FAW.1 fighter aircraft. In July, these aircraft were deployed aboard the Centaur-class aircraft carrier HMS Hermes, initially operating in the Mediterranean before proceeding to the Far East, with a return scheduled for May 1961. In November, the squadron transferred to the Audacious-class aircraft carrier HMS Ark Royal for additional operations in the Mediterranean. After returning home in early 1962, it re-joined HMS Ark Royal in March, navigating through the Mediterranean to the Far East and visiting Australia in August, ultimately returning to Yeovilton for Christmas.

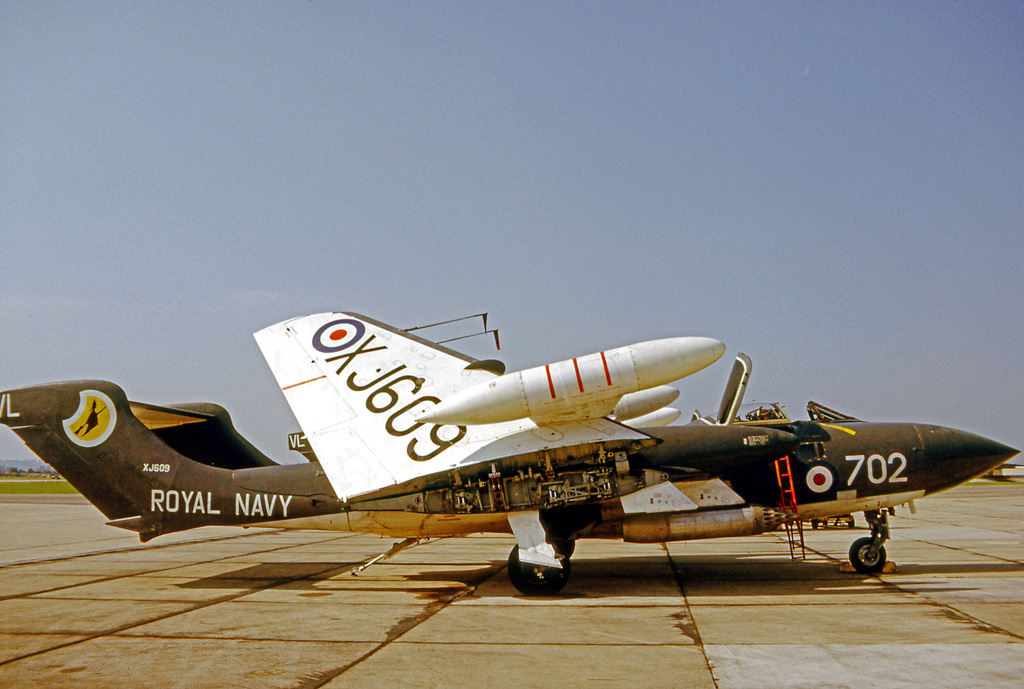
DH.110 Sea Vixen FAW.2 XJ609 of 890 NAS at RNAS Yeovilton in 1971

A subsequent deployment aboard HMS Ark Royal in 1963 included several weeks in the Indian Ocean, with stops in Aden, Yemen and Mombasa, Kenya, as well as a detachment to Nairobi, Kenya, before heading back to the Far East. Following another return at the end of the year, most of 1964 was spent on land, with only brief assignments on HMS Hermes and HMS Eagle. A detachment re-joined HMS Ark Royal for catapult and arrester wire trials upon her recommissioning in November 1965, and after a short period in Home waters, the squadron participated in the Beira Patrol off Mozambique before returning to the Far East. The squadron undertook several more Beira patrols in 1966 before disbanding at RNAS Yeovilton in October of that year.

In August 1967, the squadron was reformed at RNAS Yeovilton with four Sea Vixen FAW.1 fighter aircraft, which were subsequently upgraded to FAW.2 variants for operational trials and training purposes. Beginning in April 1970, Airwork took over the maintenance of its aircraft, and on 10 December the squadron transferred its Forward Refuelling Unit and refuelling responsibilities to the local Airwork Fleet Requirements Unit (FRU), which also replaced its aging de Havilland Sea Venom aircraft with the de Havilland Sea Vixens. Subsequently, 890 Naval Air Squadron integrated the aircraft from 766 Naval Air Squadron, temporarily functioning as the de Havilland Sea Vixen FAW.2 Headquarters squadron, but it ultimately disbanded at RNAS Yeovilton in August 1971.

== Aircraft operated ==
The squadron has operated a number of different aircraft types, including:

- Grumman Wildcat F4F-3 fighter aircraft (June–September 1942)
- Grumman Martlet Mk IV fighter aircraft (September 1942 – October 1943)
- Grumman Wildcat Mk V fighter aircraft (October 1943 – July 1944)
- Supermarine Attacker F.1 fighter aircraft (April–October 1952)
- Supermarine Attacker FB.1 fighter-bomber (July–October 1952)
- Supermarine Attacker FB.2 fighter-bomber (July–December 1952)
- de Havilland Sea Venom FAW.20 fighter-bomber (March 1954 – October 1955)
- de Havilland Sea Vampire T.22 jet trainer aircraft (August 1954 – May 1955)
- de Havilland Sea Venom FAW.21 fighter-bomber (February–June 1956)
- de Havilland Sea Vixen FAW.1 fighter aircraft (February 1960 – October 1966, August 1967 – July 1969)
- de Havilland Sea Vixen FAW.2 fighter aircraft (September 1967 – August 1971)

== Battle honours ==
The battle honours awarded to 890 Naval Air Squadron are:

- Salerno 1943

== Naval air stations and aircraft carriers ==
890 Naval Air Squadron operated from a number of naval air stations of the Royal Navy and Royal Air Force stations, in the UK and overseas, and also a number of Royal Navy fleet carriers and escort carriers and other airbases overseas:

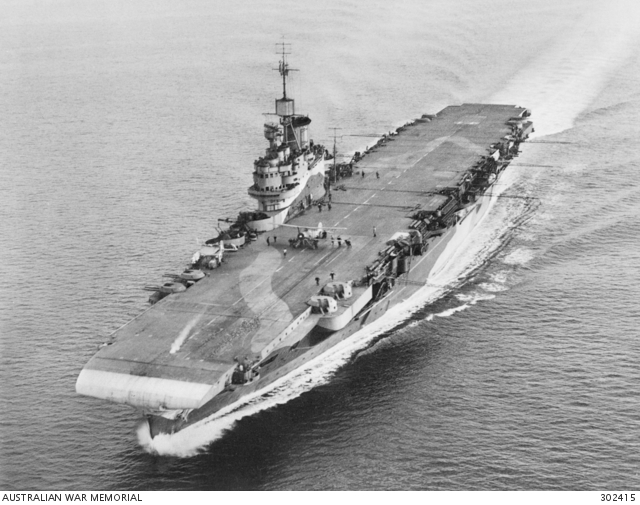
HMS Illustrious

1942–1944

- RCAF Station Dartmouth, Novia Scotia (15–26 June 1942)
- RN Air Section Norfolk, Virginia (26 June – 8 December 1942)
  - USS Charger (Deck Landing Practice, 20–23 August 1942)
- HMS Battler (8 December 1942 – 8 January 1943)
- Royal Naval Air Station Donibristle (HMS Merlin), Fife (8 January – 4 March 1943)
- Royal Naval Air Station Machrihanish (HMS Landrail), Argyll and Bute (4–25 March 1943)
  - HMS Argus (Deck Landing Training, 5 March 1943)
- Royal Naval Air Station Donibristle (HMS Merlin), Fife (25–28 March 1943)
- Royal Naval Air Station Hatston (HMS Sparrowhawk), Mainland, Orkney (28 March – 8 June 1943)
- Royal Naval Air Station Machrihanish (HMS Landrail), Argyll and Bute (8–14 June 1943)
- HMS Illustrious (14 June – 19 October 1943)
- Royal Air Force Port Ellen, Argyll and Bute (15 Gp) (19 October – 13 December 1943)
- Royal Naval Air Station Eglinton (HMS Gannet), County Londonderry (13 December 1943 – 29 January 1944)
- Royal Naval Air Station Donibristle (HMS Merlin), Fife (29 January – 17 February 1944)
- HMS London (crews transit, 17 February – 14 March 1944)
- Royal Naval Air Station Puttalam (HMS Rajaliya), Ceylon (14 March – 13 May 1944)
- HMS Atheling (13 May – 11 July 1944)
- Royal Naval Air Station Puttalam (HMS Rajaliya), Ceylon (11 July – 1 August 1944)
- disbanded (1 August 1944)

1952

- Royal Naval Air Station Ford (HMS Peregrine), Sussex (26 March – 27 October 1952)
- HMS Illustrious (Deck Landing Practice 9–17 July 1952)
- Royal Naval Air Station Milltown (HMS Fulmar II), Moray (transit 27 October 1952)
- HMS Eagle (29 October – 3 December 1952)
- Royal Naval Air Station Ford (HMS Peregrine), Sussex, disbanded (3 December 1952)

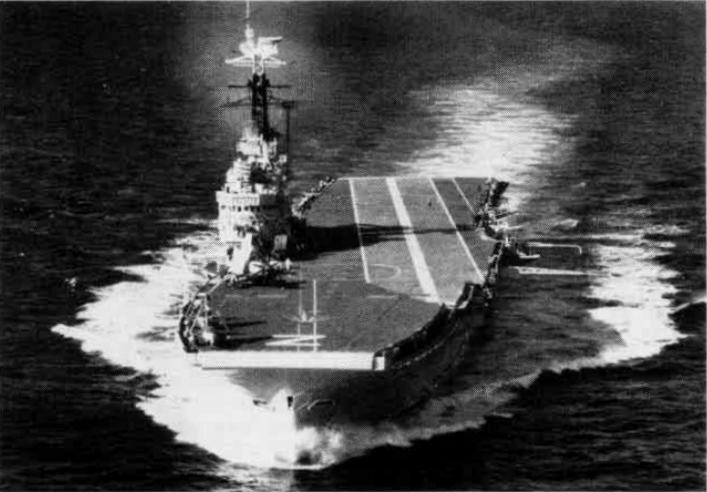
HMS Albion

1954–1955

- Royal Naval Air Station Yeovilton (HMS Heron), Somerset (2 March 1954 – 26 May 1955)
  - Royal Naval Air Station Brawdy (HMS Goldcrest), Pembrokeshire (Detachment four aircraft 19–22 October 1954)
  - Royal Naval Air Station Brawdy (HMS Goldcrest), Pembrokeshire (Detachment six aircraft 25 October – 4 November 1954)
  - HMS Bulwark (Deck Landing Practice, 16 May 1955)
- Royal Naval Air Station Yeovilton (HMS Heron), Somerset (26 May – 19 July 1955)
  - Royal Naval Air Station Brawdy (HMS Goldcrest), Pembrokeshire (Detachment two aircraft 8–10 June 1955)
- HMS Albion (19 July – 12 September 1955)
  - RN Air Section Gibraltar, Gibraltar (Detachment two aircraft 23 August – 7 September 1955)
- Royal Naval Air Station Yeovilton (HMS Heron), Somerset (12 September – 18 October 1955)
- became 766 Naval Air Squadron (18 October 1955)

1956

- Royal Naval Air Station Yeovilton (HMS Heron), Somerset (6 February – 23 April 1956)
- Royal Naval Air Station Lossiemouth (HMS Fulmar), Moray (23 April – 11 May 1956)
- Royal Naval Air Station Yeovilton (HMS Heron), Somerset (11–30 May 1956)
- HMS Bulwark (Deck Landing Practice, 30 May – 6 June 1956)
- Royal Naval Air Station Yeovilton (HMS Heron), Somerset (6 -25 June 1956)
- disbanded (25 June 1956)

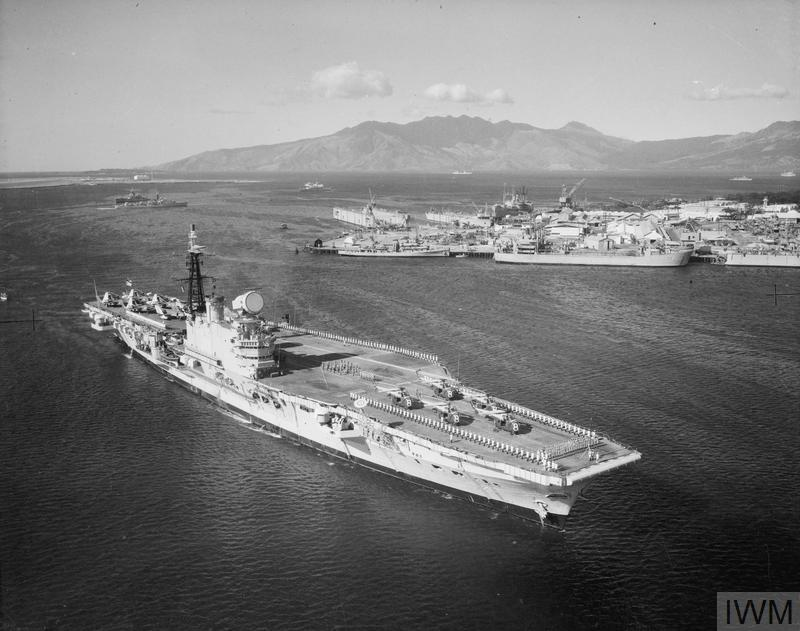
HMS Hermes

1960–1966

- Royal Naval Air Station Yeovilton (HMS Heron), Somerset (1 February – 6 July 1960)
  - HMS Hermes (Detachment two aircraft 11–16 May 1960)
- HMS Hermes (6–30 July 1960)
- Royal Naval Air Station Hal Far (HMS Falcon), Malta (30 July – 9 August 1960)
- HMS Hermes (9 August – 8 September 1960)
  - Royal Naval Air Station Lossiemouth (HMS Fulmar), Moray (Detachment 5–14 September 1960)
- Royal Naval Air Station Yeovilton (HMS Heron), Somerset (8 September – 7 November 1960)
- HMS Hermes (7 November 1960 – 18 April 1961)
  - RN Air Section Gibraltar, Gibraltar (Detachment two aircraft 15–28 November 1960)
  - Royal Air Force Tengah, Singapore (Detachment three aircraft 7–18 February 1961)
  - Royal Naval Air Station Hal Far (HMS Falcon), Malta (Detachment two aircraft 27 March – 5 April 1961)
- Royal Naval Air Station Yeovilton (HMS Heron), Somerset (18 April – 29 May 1961)
- HMS Hermes (29 May – 23 June 1961)
- Royal Naval Air Station Yeovilton (HMS Heron), Somerset (23–30 June 1961)
- HMS Hermes (30 June – 10 September 1961)
  - RN Air Section Gibraltar, Gibraltar (Detachment three aircraft 18–21 July 1961)
- Royal Naval Air Station Yeovilton (HMS Heron), Somerset (10 September – 13 November 1961)
  - HMS Ark Royal (Detachment Deck Landing Practice 24–26 October 1961)
- HMS Ark Royal (13 November 1961 – 13 January 1962)
  - RN Air Section Gibraltar, Somerset (Detachment four aircraft 16–20 November 1961)
  - Royal Naval Air Station Hal Far (HMS Falcon), Malta (Detachment six aircraft 16 December 1961 – 2 February 1962)
- Royal Naval Air Station Yeovilton (HMS Heron), Somerset (13 January – 10 March 1962)
- HMS Ark Royal (10 March – 14 December 1962)
  - Royal Air Force Tengah, Singapore (Detachment four aircraft 28 June – 12 June 1962)
  - Royal Air Force Tengah, Singapore (Detachment six aircraft 29 July – 6 August 1962)
  - RAAF Base Pearce, Western Australia (Detachment six aircraft 18–30 August 1962)
  - Royal Air Force Tengah, Singapore (Detachment four aircraft 13–28 September 1962)
- Royal Naval Air Station Yeovilton (HMS Heron), Somerset (14 December 1962 – 19 February 1963)
- HMS Ark Royal (19 February – 15 March 1963)
- Royal Naval Air Station Yeovilton (HMS Heron), Somerset (15 March – 4 May 1963)
- HMS Ark Royal (4 May – 28 December 1963)
  - Embakasi, Kenya (Detachment six aircraft 7–19 June 1963)
  - Royal Air Force Tengah, Singapore (Detachment seven aircraft 10–25 July 1963)
  - Royal Air Force Tengah, Singapore (Detachment eight aircraft 6–29 August 1963)
  - Embakasi, Kenya (Detachment six aircraft 18 October – 1 November 1963)
- Royal Naval Air Station Yeovilton (HMS Heron), Somerset (28 December 1963 – 16 January 1964)
- HMS Hermes (16–30 January 1964)

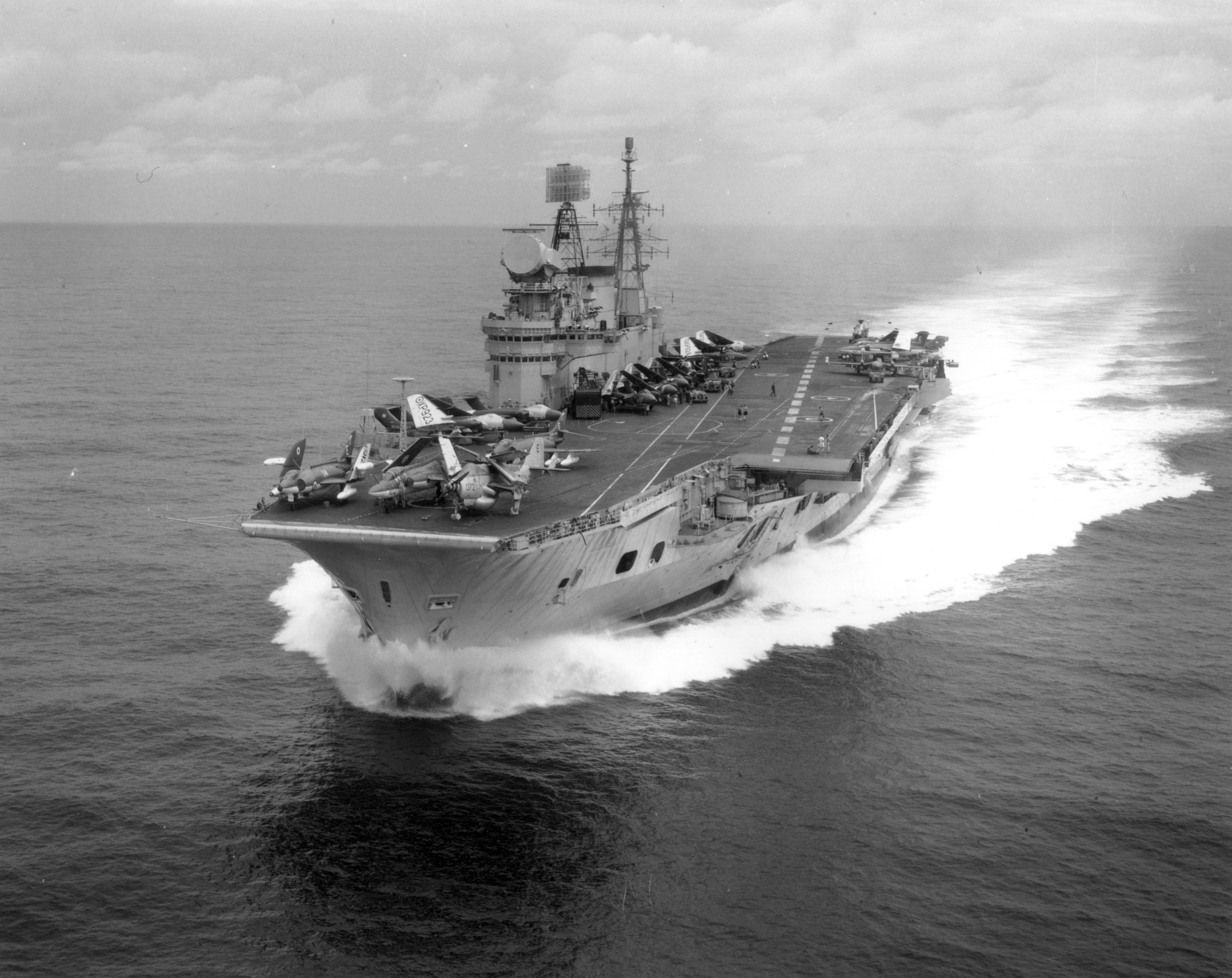
HMS Eagle, used for DLP

- Royal Naval Air Station Yeovilton (HMS Heron), Somerset (30 January 1964 – 14 January 1965)
  - HMS Eagle (Deck Landing Practice 6–7 November 1964)
  - HMS Ark Royal (Detachment four aircraft trials 30 November – 10 December 1964)
- HMS Ark Royal (14 January – 16 March 1965)
  - Royal Naval Air Station Lossiemouth (HMS Fulmar), Moray (Detachment five aircraft 13–25 February 1965)
- Royal Naval Air Station Yeovilton (HMS Heron), Somerset (16 March – 17 May 1965)
- HMS Ark Royal (17–27 May 1965)
- Royal Naval Air Station Yeovilton (HMS Heron), Somerset (27 May – 17 June 1965)
- HMS Ark Royal (17 June – 19 July 1965)
- Royal Air Force Changi, Singapore (19 July – 4 August 1965)
- HMS Ark Royal (4 August – 3 September 1965)
- Royal Air Force Changi, Singapore (3–19 September 1965)
- HMS Ark Royal (18 September – 19 October 1965)
- Royal Air Force Changi, Singapore (19 October – 10 November 1965)
- RAAF Butterworth, Malaysia (10–21 November 1965)
- Royal Air Force Changi, Singapore (21 November – 7 December 1965)
- HMS Ark Royal (7 December 1965 – 7 January 1966)
- Royal Air Force Changi, Singapore (7 January – 6 February 1966)
- HMS Ark Royal (6 February – 23 March 1966)
- Royal Air Force Changi, Singapore (23 March – 26 April 1966)
- HMS Ark Royal (26 April – 7 June 1966)
- Royal Naval Air Station Yeovilton (HMS Heron), Somerset (7 June – 2 August 1966)
- HMS Ark Royal (2 August – 1 October 1966)
- Royal Naval Air Station Yeovilton (HMS Heron), Somerset (1–7 October 1966)
- disbanded (7 October 1966)

1967–1971

- Royal Naval Air Station Yeovilton (HMS Heron), Somerset (14 August 1967 – 17 March 1971)
  - Royal Air Force Akrotiri, Cyprus (Detachment two aircraft 16–29 April 1968)
  - Nordholz Naval Airbase, Germany (Detachment two aircraft 9–15 June 1968)
  - Royal Naval Air Station Lossiemouth (HMS Fulmar), Moray (Detachment two 20–27 October 1969)
- Royal Naval Air Station Lossiemouth (HMS Fulmar), Moray (17 March – 6 April 1971)
- Royal Naval Air Station Yeovilton (HMS Heron), Somerset (6 April – 3 May 1971)
- Air Base Karup, Denmark (3–13 May 1971)
- Royal Naval Air Station Yeovilton (HMS Heron), Somerset (13 May – 6 August 1971)
- disbanded (6 August 1971)

== Commanding officers ==
List of commanding officers of 890 Naval Air Squadron with date of appointment:

1942–1944

- Lieutenant Commander J.W. Sleigh, DSC, RN, from 15 June 1942
- Lieutenant Commander N.A. Bartlett, RN, from 4 November 1943
- disbanded – 1 August 1944

1952

- Lieutenant Commander R.W. Kearsley, RN, from 26 March 1952
- disbanded – 3 December 1952

1954–1955

- Lieutenant Commander A. Gordon-Johnson, RN, from 2 March 1954
- Lieutenant Commander L.A. Jeyes, RN, from 7 August 1955
- disbanded – 18 October 1955

1956

- Lieutenant Commander P.S. Brewer, RN, from 6 February 1956 (Killed in flight accident 4 June 1956)
- Lieutenant Commander P.G. Young, RN, from 5 June 1956
- disbanded – 25 June 1956

1960–1966

- Lieutenant Commander W.R. Hart, AFC, RN, from 1 February 1960
- Lieutenant Commander D. Monsell, RN, from 11 September 1961
- Lieutenant Commander R.G.M. Campbell, RN, from 15 July 1963
- Lieutenant Commander A.M.G. Pearson, RN, from 15 April 1965
- disbanded – 7 October 1966

1967–1971

- Lieutenant Commander M.F. Kennett, RN, from 14 August 1967
- Lieutenant Commander W.R. Patterson, RN, from 2 February 1968
- Lieutenant Commander M.J. Bateman, RN, from 6 January 1969
- Lieutenant Commander F. Milner, RN, from 23 January 1970
- Lieutenant Commander P.R. Sheppard, RN, from 14 January 1971
- disbanded – 6 August 1971
