= Sailing (Sutherland Brothers song) =

1972 single by The Sutherland Bros. Band

- UK vinyl release of the Sutherland Brothers version

Single by The Sutherland Bros. Band
- B-side: "Who's Crying Now"
- Released: June 1972
- Label: Island
- Songwriter: Gavin Sutherland
- Producer: Muff Winwood

The Sutherland Bros. Band singles chronology
"The Pie" (1972)	"Sailing" (1972)	"Lady Like You" (1972)

"Sailing" is a song composed by Gavin Sutherland of the Sutherland Brothers in 1972, best known as a 1975 international hit for Rod Stewart.

== Sutherland Brothers original recording ==
"Sailing" was written and recorded by the Sutherland Brothers – a duo consisting of Gavin and Iain Sutherland – in a June 1972 session. The brothers provided their own backing with Gavin on bass drum and Iain on harmonium. They intended the song to have a "Celtic feel to it", and overdubbed their vocals. In a 1975 interview with the Scottish Daily Express, Gavin Sutherland said of the song:

"The amusing thing about 'Sailing' is that most people take the song to be about a young guy telling his girl that he's crossing the Atlantic to be with her. In fact, the song's got nothing to do with romance or ships; it's an account of mankind's spiritual odyssey through life on his way to freedom and fulfillment with the Supreme Being."

Issued as a single, the song reached No. 54 in July 1972, and the single's sales were reportedly 40,000 units. The Sutherland Brothers had recorded "Sailing" subsequent to completing the tracks intended for their upcoming album release Lifeboat, and that album was issued in November 1972 without the inclusion of "Sailing": included on the US edition of the Lifeboat album, "Sailing" by the Sutherland Brothers would make its UK album debut on the 1976 Sutherland Brothers' compilation album entitled Sailing.

== Rod Stewart version ==
"Sailing"
- UK vinyl release of the Rod Stewart version

Single by Rod Stewart

from the album Atlantic Crossing
- B-side: "Stone Cold Sober" "All in the Name of Rock 'n' Roll" (US)
- Released: 8 August 1975
- Recorded: Early-mid 1975
- Studio: Muscle Shoals Sound Studio, Sheffield, Alabama, U.S.
- Genre: Soft rock
- Length: 4:30 (LP); 3:31 (single)
- Label: Warner Bros.
- Songwriter: Gavin Sutherland
- Producer: Tom Dowd

Rod Stewart singles chronology
"Farewell" (UK) (1974) "Let Me Be Your Car" (US)" (1975)	"Sailing" (1975)	"This Old Heart of Mine" (1975)

Music video
- "Sailing" on YouTube

=== Overview ===
"Sailing" was recorded by Rod Stewart for his first album recorded in North America rather than Great Britain: Atlantic Crossing, which was recorded April – June 1975 at Muscle Shoals Sound Studio with Tom Dowd producing. The first single from the album, "Sailing" was an international hit, notably in the UK, where it was number one for four weeks in September 1975. It returned to the UK chart in 1976 and, with less success, in 1987. "Sailing" remains Stewart's biggest single hit in the UK, but was not a top 40 hit in his newly adopted US homeland.

=== Background ===
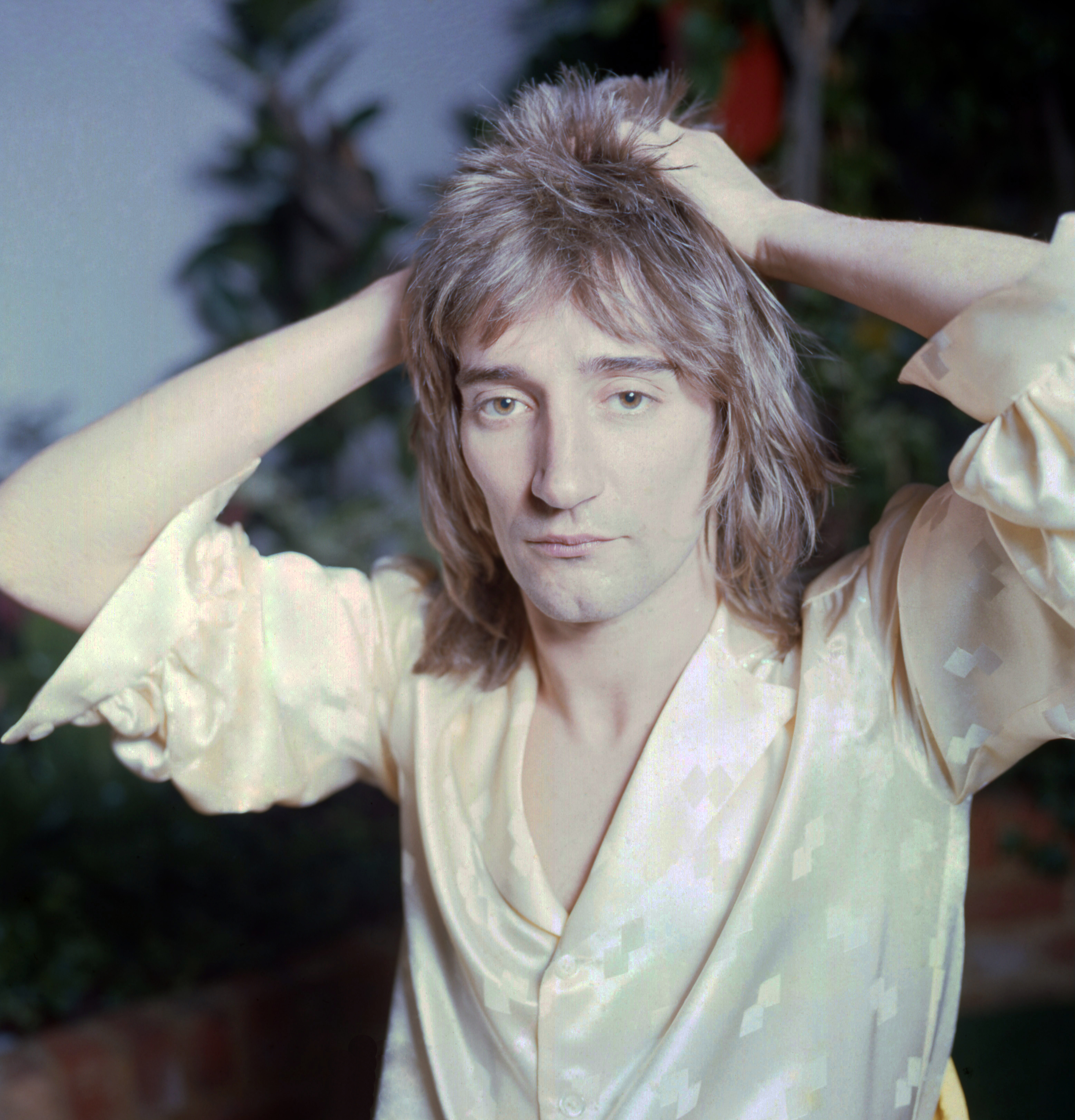
Stewart in 1972

According to Iain Sutherland the connection between the Sutherland Brothers and Rod Stewart which led to Stewart's recording of "Sailing" began when Stewart's live-in girlfriend Dee Harrington saw the Sutherland Brothers on the 20 June 1972 broadcast of the BBC2 music program The Old Grey Whistle Test: Harrington recommended the Sutherland Brothers as a musical act that would interest Stewart, and Stewart did indeed become a Sutherland Brothers fan after seeing them perform at the Marquee Club. According to Gavin Sutherland, the Sutherland Brothers co-wrote two original songs with Stewart which Stewart hoped to record for Atlantic Crossing: however the only Sutherland Brothers tune Stewart would record for the album would be "Sailing" whose seemingly nautical theme complemented the album's title.

Stewart would recall the recording of "Sailing" being a challenge: he was awoken in his hotel room by a 10 am phone call from Dowd at Muscle Shoals, in which Dowd said "Get down here in half an hour; we've mixed the track and need the vocal"; Stewart (quote): "I was like: 'You're joking, recording at 10:30 in the morning. I need a drink to calm the old nerves'...There was nothing [alcoholic] to be had anywhere and I was terrified to sing without [a drink]"..."I'd never sung anything in a studio without having a drink – let alone a big old anthem. And I'd never sung anything, anywhere that early in the morning. Got it in six or seven takes though."

=== Impact and legacy ===
Despite his enthusiasm for the Sutherland Brothers, Stewart said that he "argued vehemently" against the release of "Sailing" as the lead single from Atlantic Crossing, instead advocating his own composition "Three Time Loser". Gavin Sutherland said, "I don't think Rod personally wanted ["Sailing"] put out as a single. He just saw it as a big ballady-kind of last track, side two, finish to Atlantic Crossing which had several other great tracks on it." "Sailing" had an August 1975 UK single release parallel with the album release of Atlantic Crossing: reaching No. 2 UK in its second week of release, Stewart's "Sailing" would have a four-week tenure at No. 1 in the UK.

Stewart's "Sailing" had a UK chart revival in 1976 as a result of the track being utilized as the theme song for Sailor, a documentary series on HMS Ark Royal which BBC1 aired for ten weeks from 5 August 1976. "Sailing" ranked at No. 50 on the UK chart dated 4 September 1976 and the track's renewed popularity continued even after the 7 October 1976 finale of the Sailor TV series, as "Sailing" reached its 1976 chart peak of No. 3 on the UK charts dated 16 – 23 October 1976, with the track remaining in the UK Top 50 into January 1977. Stewart performed "Sailing" live on the Top of the Pops broadcast of 23 September 1976. "Sailing" remains Stewart's biggest-selling single in the UK: in November 2012 it was reported that "Sailing" by Rod Stewart had sold 1.12 million units in the UK with a resultant ranking at No. 112 of the 123 UK million-selling singles.

In the US, where Atlantic Crossing had been issued in August 1975 without a single release, "Sailing" was issued as the album's lead single in October 1975 but failed to reach the Top 40 of Billboard, attaining a Hot 100 peak of No. 58. Overall "Sailing" did afford Stewart a major international success reaching No.1 in Ireland, the Netherlands, and Norway; No. 2 in Australia, Belgium's Flemish Region, South Africa and Switzerland; No. 3 in New Zealand; No. 4 in Germany; No. 7 in Austria; No. 13 in Sweden.

The first music video for "Sailing" was filmed in the Port of Dublin and also featured footage shot on the major Dublin thoroughfare Moore Street: featuring Stewart and his partner Britt Ekland, the video aired on the Top of the Pops broadcast of 28 August 1975. Another music video for "Sailing" was shot in New York Harbor in 1978, and would become one of the first to be aired on MTV when it launched on 1 August 1981.

As the British task-force sailed out of Portsmouth Harbour on 5 April 1982 – the third day of the Falklands War – the recording of Rod Stewart's "Sailing" was broadcast from the quay's public address system.

In 1987 "Sailing" was reissued as a charity single after the Herald of Free Enterprise disaster off the Flemish port of Zeebrugge, becoming a moderate hit in Belgium's Flemish Region (No. 24) and also the British Isles (No. 41 UK/ No. 30 Ireland) ("Sailing" would be the only charting Rod Stewart single in the British Isles in 1987).

=== Live performances ===
Although Stewart had been touring the US with the Faces at the time of the autumn 1975 single release of "Sailing" that tour's setlist was focused on Stewart's collaborations with the Faces, with "Three Time Loser" being the only Atlantic Crossing number to be included. "Sailing" would debut as a Rod Stewart concert number during his European tour of November 1976 – January 1977 with the song usually serving as each show's purported finale to be followed with "Stay With Me" as encore: Stewart's 1 November 1976 performance at the Trondheim Spektrum in Norway launched the tour which after dates in Scandinavia, Finland, Belgium and the Netherlands played nine cities in Great Britain including six nights (21–24 December 1976/14–15 January 1977) at the Olympia London.

Stewart's 1982 Absolutely Live concert album features a performance of "Sailing". He performed "Sailing" at the 20 June 1986 Prince's Trust All-Star Rock Concert – with Elton John on piano and Eric Clapton on guitar – and at the 1 July 2007 Concert for Diana memorial gala for Diana, Princess of Wales: both events were held at Wembley Stadium.

=== Charts ===
==== Weekly charts ====
Chart (1975–1976)	Peak position
Australia (Kent Music Report)	2
Belgium (Ultratop 50 Flanders)	2
Belgium (VRT Top 30 Flanders)	1
Canada (RPM 100 Singles)	58
France (SNEP)	47
Ireland (IRMA)	1
Netherlands (Dutch Top 40)	1
Netherlands (Single Top 100)	1
New Zealand (Recorded Music NZ)	3
Norway (VG-lista)	1
South Africa (Springbok Radio)	2
Sweden (Sverigetopplistan)	20
Switzerland (Schweizer Hitparade)	2
UK (Official Charts Company)	1
US Billboard Hot 100	58
West Germany (GfK)	4
Zimbabwe (ZIMA)	1

Chart (1976)	Peak position
Austria (Ö3 Austria Top 40)	7
New Zealand (Recorded Music NZ)	9
Sweden (Sverigetopplistan)	13
UK (Official Charts Company)	3

Chart (1978)	Peak position
New Zealand (Recorded Music NZ)	16

Chart (1987)	Peak position
Belgium (Ultratop 50 Flanders)	24
Ireland (IRMA)	30
UK (Official Charts Company)	41

==== Year-end charts ====
Chart (1975)	Peak position
Australia (Kent Music Report)	24
Chart (1976)	Peak position
Australia (Kent Music Report)	57

=== Certifications ===
Certifications for "Sailing" Rod Stewart version
Region	Certification	Certified units/sales
New Zealand (RMNZ)	Gold	15,000^{‡}
^{‡} Sales+streaming figures based on certification alone.

== Rock Against Repatriation version ==
In December 1990 "Sailing" was remade as a protest song against the repatriation of Vietnamese boat people who had fled to Hong Kong: Steve Hackett, who organized this multi-artist recording, intended to raise funds to assist those living in refugee camps, would recall:

I remember...sitting there with Brian May and we were overdubbing the song on Christmas Eve. I had gotten people to work in England on Christmas Eve, Christmas Day and Boxing Day...I was becoming a professional beggar as you do when you undertake charity work. I was worried that I pushed a lot of my friends, family and management to the limit with this. But even as we sat there Christmas Eve doing the overdubs, they showed [the participating artists] working on TV from when they filmed us earlier. It had everyone singing along and it was a nice buzz for Brian and me. I was worried I pushed him on it, but he said 'No, you got me out of myself by doing that. I'm glad you did that.' So, it was a good effort.

It was announced that both the Sutherland Brothers: Gavin and Iain, would be featured on the recording, although only Iain Sutherland would in fact be featured. This version of "Sailing" was issued on 19 February 1990 with the artist credit Rock Against Repatriation, spending a single week on the UK chart ranking at #89 for the week ending 3 March 1990, and – despite Hackett's statement that "I must have done over twenty TV shows here in North America" in support of the single and its cause – a US release went unnoticed. Hackett later said, "The single didn't accomplish what I wanted it to."

=== Personnel ===
- Iain Sutherland, Paul Carrack, Jim Diamond, Fish, Kevin Godley, Justin Hayward, Steve Hogarth, Mark King, Bonnie Tyler – vocals
- Tom Conti, Paul Muggleton – backing vocals
- John Hackett – flute
- Steve Hackett, Steve Rothery – guitar, backing vocals
- Howard Jones – piano
- Mark Kelly – keyboards, backing vocals
- London Chamber
  Orchestra, arranged by Nick Magnus – strings
- Nick Magnus – keyboards, percussion
- Phil Manzanera, Mike Rutherford – guitar
- Ian Mosley – percussion, backing vocals
- Pino Palladino – bass
- Simon Phillips – drums
- The Pride of Murray – bagpipes
- Curt Smith – guitar, vocals
- Pete Trewavas – bass, backing vocals
- Judie Tzuke – vocals, backing vocals
- Adam Woods – percussion

=== Charts ===
Chart (1990)	Peak position
UK Singles (Official Charts)	89

== Other versions ==
"Sailing" has also been recorded by Joan Baez (album Blowin' Away 1977), Brotherhood of Man (album 20 Number One Hits 1980), the Nolan Sisters (album 20 Giant Hits 1978), Smokie, (album Uncovered Too 2002) and Dame Vera Lynn. Robin Trower (with bassist James Dewar on vocals) covered the song on the 1976 album Long Misty Days and Roger Whittaker on the 1978 album Roger Whittaker Sings the Hits., Aled Jones. Instrumental versions of "Sailing" have been recorded by the London Symphony Orchestra (album Classic Rock 1977) and Richard Clayderman (album A Little Night Music – 12 Classic Love Songs 1988).

A French version ("Ma musique") has been recorded by Joe Dassin in 1975.

A re-worded rave version by Slipstreem was a top 20 hit single in the UK in 1993.

The song's melody is used for the football chant "No one likes us, we don't care", sung by Millwall supporters. The melody is also used by German football club Hertha BSC Berlin for their chant Nur Nach Hause (Just homewards) written by Berlin-based Entertainer and Hertha-Fan Frank Zander. Nur Nach Hause is sung before every Hertha home game. Vitória S.C. also plays their version of the song, "Sou Vitória", at the start of every home game.

At the time of the Voyage of Greta Thunberg in 2019, climate strikers in Steyning performed the song with the lyrics "Greta's Sailing".
