= HMS Intrepid (L11) =

1967 Fearless-class landing platform dock of the Royal Navy

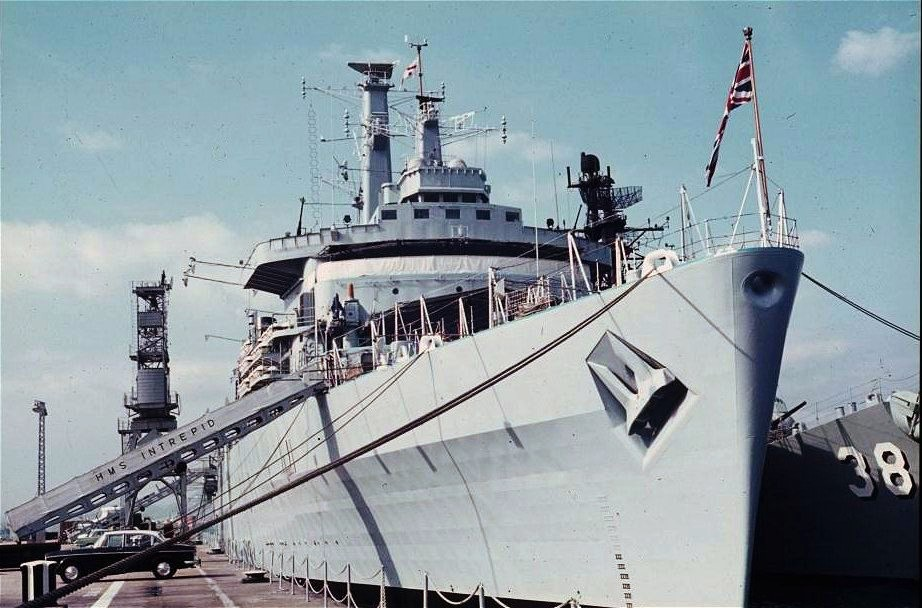

History

United Kingdom
- Name: Intrepid
- Ordered: 1 May 1962
- Builder: John Brown & Company
- Laid down: 19 December 1962
- Launched: 25 June 1964
- Commissioned: 11 March 1967
- Decommissioned: 31 August 1999
- Identification: Pennant L11; IMO number: 4907189
- Motto: "Cela va sans dire"; ("That goes without saying")
- Fate: Towed to Liverpool for scrapping September 2008

General characteristics
- Class & type: Fearless-class landing platform dock
- Displacement: 12,120 long tons (12,314 t) full load
- Length: 520 ft (158.5 m) oa; 500 ft (152.4 m) wl
- Beam: 80 ft (24.4 m)
- Draught: 20 ft 6 in (6.25 m)
- Propulsion: 2 shafts; 2 English Electric Steam turbines; 2 Babock & Wilcox boilers (550 psi (3,800 kPa) at 850 °F (454 °C)); 22,000 shp (16,000 kW)
- Speed: 21 kn (39 km/h; 24 mph)
- Range: 5,000 nmi (9,260 km; 5,750 mi) at 20 kn (37 km/h; 23 mph)
- Boats & landing craft carried: 4× LCM (9) landing craft in dock; 4× LCVP landing craft on davits
- Capacity: Normal capacity 380–400 troops, up to 700 troops for short periods; 15 tanks; 27 vehicles
- Complement: 550 including small Royal Marines detachment (approx 88) and 2 Army Troops (Until 1973)
- Sensors & processing systems: Type 974 search radar; Type 978 Navigation radar
- Armament: Original armament:4× Sea Cat SAM launchers; 2 × Bofors 40/60; 1990 Armament: 2× Sea Cat; 4× Oerlikon KCB 30 mm cannon (2 twin mounts); 2× Oerlikon GAM-B01 20 mm cannon
- Aircraft carried: Up to 5 Westland Wessex helicopters.

HMS Intrepid (L11) was one of two Fearless-class amphibious warfare ships of the Royal Navy. A landing platform dock (LPD), she served from 1967 until 1999. Based in HM Naval Base, Devonport, Plymouth, Devon and HM Naval Base Portsmouth, she saw service around the world over her 32-year life.

The ship featured a floodable internal dock, accessed via a ramp at the stern for vehicles to embark, at sea, the stern would be partially submerged, allowing landing craft to load or unload vehicles and personnel directly from the deck. She carried four Landing Craft Utility (LCU)s in the well dock and four smaller Landing Craft Vehicle Personnel (LCVP) mounted on davits along the superstructure. Accommodation was provided for up to 400 embarked troops, which could be increased to 700.

She was slated for decommissioning under terms of the 1981 Defence White Paper, but rapidly returned to service as part of the British operation to retake the Falkland Islands after the 1982 Argentine invasion.

== Role ==
The landing platform docks (LPDs) supported a Royal Marines amphibious assault force and served as a platform for the headquarters element before and during the assault phase. The Royal Marines on board formed the 4th Assault Squadron, which operated four Landing Craft Utility (LCUs), four Landing Craft Vehicle Personnel (LCVPs), and a Beach Party. The Beach Party was equipped with a Land Rover, a Bedford 4-ton truck, two tractor units, and a Centurion Beach Armoured Recovery Vehicle (BARV).

The squadron was also responsible for managing embarkation and disembarkation, radio communications, and administrative support, ensuring that personnel and equipment were landed in the required order.

== Service ==
Intrepid was the second of her class of purpose built LPDs used by Royal Navy. She was built in Clydebank, West Dunbartonshire, at the John Brown & Company yard and was launched in 1964 before undergoing trials and commissioning in 1967. She was the last ship to be built by John Brown & Co for the Royal Navy.

The LPDs were intended to provide both a heavy lift for amphibious operations and to support a one-star (Brigade) Headquarters afloat. As originally designed, they could carry a load of fifteen main battle tanks (MBTs), five self-propelled guns, eight recovery and engineer vehicles, six 3-ton trucks with trailers and twenty-eight Land Rovers and trailers, with accommodation for up to 450 troops, in essence an Armoured Battle Group.

The ships were equipped with an extensive array of communications equipment and an Amphibious Operations Room (AOR) linked to the Main Communications Office (MCO) and adjacent to the ships own Operations Room on 03 deck. The AOR was used by the Brigade Headquarters until it moved ashore. In addition to HQ 3 Commando Brigade, it could also be used by the army Brigade designated for amphibious operations. In the early 1970s this was Headquarters 24 (Air portable) Brigade based at Plymouth.

To support these roles, part of the original ship's complement included two army units, 661 Signal Troop and 506 Operating Troop RCT. The Signal Troop lived and worked with the ship's Communications Division whereas the Operating Troop, which included RCT stevedores, a Royal Engineers beach section and a REME recovery crew equipped with a Beach Armoured Recovery Vehicle (BARV), worked as part of the Royal Marines Beach Unit. However, in the early 1970s the decision by the Royal Navy to re-role the LPDs, in rotation, as the Dartmouth Training Ship significantly reduced their availability for amphibious operations and training. The army subsequently decided to disband both units and this took place on 3 December 1973 at Devonport. Subsequently, both roles were taken over by the Royal Marines.

In November 1967, Intrepid formed part of a naval task force deployed to cover the British Withdrawal from Aden. On 29 March 1968, Intrepid and the frigate Tartar were deployed to patrol off the Greater and Lesser Tunbs, small islands in the Persian Gulf, to deter Iran from occupying the islands. Intrepid became the first Royal Navy warship equipped with satellite communication equipment in 1969.

Intrepid was the command-and-control ship for major disaster relief operation in East Pakistan in November 1970. The 1970 Bhola cyclone was a devastating tropical cyclone that struck East Pakistan (present-day Bangladesh) and India's West Bengal on 3 November 1970. It remains the deadliest tropical cyclone ever recorded and one of the deadliest natural disasters. Melting snow from the Himalayas met the storm surge that flooded much of the low-lying islands of the Ganges Delta. Intrepid with HMS Triumph left Singapore for the Bay of Bengal to assist with the relief efforts. Force controlled twenty helicopters, eight landing craft, 650 troops, and assisted international and civilian rescue teams distributing supplies. At least 500,000 people lost their lives in the storm.

1974 "Intrepid" returned to UK waters and went into an AMP refit at Portsmouth. A new crew was recruited by Drafty and the AMP was completed. Recommissioning took place with Captain Nicholas Hunt being given the command. 1975 Work Up and Sea Trials began at FOST along with RM storming the hills above Portland for various joint exercises for readiness of the crew, a quick sail across the channel to Cherbourg for the first foreign trip of the 'Second Commission'. Leave for Easter break completed, the ship headed to the Med for Gib, Corsica, Malta and several exercises along with the Hermes. 1975 was spent in the Med. 1976 across the pond to South America, North America, West Indies including a 'DISASTER RELIEF' for an island volcano eruption and then home for Easter. Leave for Easter Break completed, the ship headed into European waters calling at : Amsterdam, Gdansk, Aarhus, Sonje Fjord, Copenhagen, Rosyth (not necessarily in that order), completing exercises along the journey to continue with the state of readiness for war in the stated 'Cold War'. Intrepid reached Pompey in July 1976 and was scheduled and accepted into a LMP refit.

As a result of defence cuts, Intrepid went into reserve in 1976, being brought back into active service in 1979 to allow Fearless to be refitted.

In 1981 was announced that the two LPDs were to be decommissioned

=== Falklands War (1982) ===
At the outbreak of the Falklands War, Intrepid was recommissioned to support the British task force dispatched to recover the islands. She was rapidly brought back into commission, with her ship's company recalled by Commander Bryn Telfer (the Executive Officer), and Malcolm MacLeod, the crew forming part of the task group committed to Operation Corporate, the British effort to recapture the islands. Intrepid was commanded by Captain Peter Dingemans. and embarked elements of 3 Commando Brigade, along with vehicles, supplies and landing craft; she sailed south as part of the amphibious group under Rear Admiral Sandy Woodward.

On 21 May, she participated in the amphibious landings at San Carlos Water during Operation Sutton. Intrepid offloaded troops, artillery and armoured vehicles using her Landing Craft Utility (LCUs) and Landing Craft Vehicle Personnel (LCVPs), while under frequent air attack. She also served as a forward command post and helicopter operations platform. Sandy Woodward commended the efforts of the ships involved in the San Carlos attacks.

The Intrepid would be the last ship to arrive, the last piece in the jigsaw, and so all the timings depended on her.

On 25 May, landing craft from Intrepid assisted with the insertion of Special Boat Service patrols ahead of the attacks on Darwin and Goose Green, carrying out covert night landings along the coast. Although operating in a known high-threat area, she sustained no hits despite repeated air raids.

On 27 May, an A-4B Skyhawk (C-215) of Argentine Grupo 5 was damaged by 40mm Bofors fire from Intrepid while over San Carlos Water and later crashed near Port Howard. The pilot, Primer Teniente Mariano Velasco ejected and was rescued by friendly forces two days later.

The BARV from Intrepid became stuck on the landing area known as "Red Beach", suffered a quillshaft failure and remained static for the duration of the war.

Following the Argentine surrender on 14 June, Intrepid remained in theatre to assist with prisoner handling, logistics and the redeployment of forces.

Intrepid sailed from the Falkland Islands on 26 June 1982, departing San Carlos Water for the return voyage to Britain. She arrived at Portsmouth on 14 July 1982, greeted by crowds and a formal welcome by naval officials. On the return passage, she carried a mixture of military equipment and personnel from 3 Commando Brigade.

=== Refit ===
Intrepid underwent refit at Devonport Royal Dockyard between January 1984 and June 1985. During this period, her 1940s-era 40 mm Bofors guns and two of her 1960s-era Sea Cat surface-to-air missile launchers were removed. They were replaced by two BMARC GAM-B01 20 mm cannons on the bridge wings, along with two twin, Oerlikon/BMARC GCM-A03 30 mm guns on her mid deck.

From June 1985 until 1990, she supported the sea training phase of initial officer training conducted at the Britannia Royal Naval College, operating as part of the Dartmouth Training Squadron. During the same period, Intrepid also hosted Marine Engineering Artificer Apprentices from HMS Sultan, providing their required sea training. Each intake spent three to four months aboard, rotating through departments weekly to gain experience across a range of Royal Navy specialisations.

== Decommissioned ==
Intrepid was placed in reserve in late 1990 following the completion of an extensive refit of her sister ship, Fearless. By this time, Intrepid was in poor physical condition, which ruled out a similar modernisation. She was laid up at HM Naval Base Portsmouth, used as a source of spare parts for Fearless, and formally decommissioned in 1999, remaining moored in Fareham Creek, Hampshire, pending disposal.

On 12 February 2007, the Ministry of Defence announced that Intrepid would be recycled. Leavesley International was selected as the preferred bidder, subject to the acquisition of the necessary licences. The contract stipulated that disposal would be carried out in full compliance with international environmental regulations.

Having secured the required planning permission and environmental approvals, Intrepid departed Portsmouth for Liverpool on 13 September 2008 to be dismantled. Earlier proposals had suggested preserving her as a static diving site off the south coast. A group of Falklands War veterans launched a petition on the 10 Downing Street website to retain the ship as a memorial to the conflict, though this was unsuccessful.

Replacement LPDs Albion and Bulwark were ordered during the 1990s and commissioned in 2003 and 2005 respectively.
