= Sailor (TV series) =

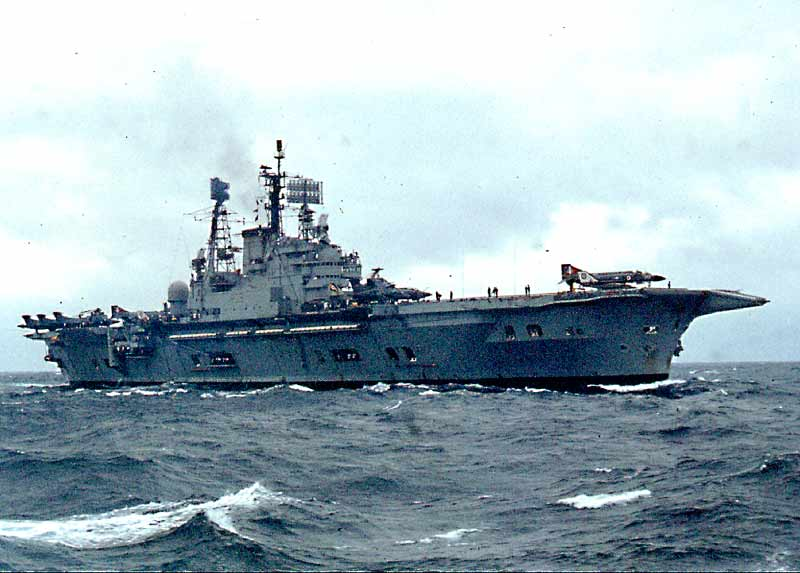
- HMS Ark Royal in 1976
- Genre: Documentary
- Directed by: John Purdie
- Opening theme: "Sailing" by Rod Stewart
- Country of origin: United Kingdom
- Original language: English
- No. of episodes: 10

Production
- Executive producer: Roger Mills
- Producer: John Purdie
- Production location: HMS Ark Royal in North Atlantic
- Cinematography: Patrick Turley
- Camera setup: Peter Gordon
- Running time: 326 mins. total
- Production company: BBC

Original release
- Network: BBC One
- Release: 26 August – 7 October 1976

Sailor is a major BBC television documentary series, first shown in 1976, about life on board the fourth HMS Ark Royal, a British aircraft carrier. It followed the ship on a five-and-a-half-month deployment to North America in 1976.

The series was filmed after the completion of a major refit and coincided with the 21st anniversary of her commissioning. It is particularly noteworthy for its depiction of fixed-wing aircraft operation in the Royal Navy before its demise in 1978, with the paying off and scrapping of Ark Royal. It shows the Phantom, Buccaneer, Gannet, Sea King and Wessex air group from 809 Naval Air Squadron, 824 Naval Air Squadron, 849 Naval Air Squadron and 892 Naval Air Squadron.

== Series ==
=== Episodes ===
Episode	Title	Original airdate	Summary
1	"Last Run Ashore"	5 August 1976	The officers of HMS Ark Royal attend the departure briefing while the majority of the crew enjoy a last night ashore in Plymouth before the ship departs on a five-month deployment.
2	"The Squadrons Are Coming"	12 August 1976	In the Western Approaches, Ark Royal welcomes her air group back aboard, with the occasional hairy approach for newly qualified aviators. Meanwhile, members of the crew get lessons in responsibility.
3	"Happy Birthday"	19 August 1976	Orders are received to divert towards the Azores to aid in the medical evacuation of a US sailor from the submarine USS Bergall. Two Sea King helicopters are sent to meet the submarine to recover the patient who is evacuated to a medical centre on the Azores mainland. NOTE: This episode was voted best factual programme at the 1977 British Academy Awards, and was repeated on 22 April that year.
4	"Thoughts of Home"	26 August 1976	
5	"Puerto Rican Banyan"	2 September 1976	
6	"Officer Territory"	9 September 1976	
7	"Theatre Workshop"	16 September 1976	
8	"Florida USA"	23 September 1976	
9	"Homeward Bound"	30 September 1976	
10	"Back Home"	7 October 1976	Ship's Company return home for Runs Ashore and bang-offs

=== Appearances ===
Captain Wilfred Graham, who later became Flag Officer, Portsmouth (FOP) (now obsolete), is the Ark Royal's commanding officer during its deployment. Commander David Cowling, who features heavily in the series, was the executive officer. The officer in training featured in Episode 6 is Chris Parry who fired the first shots in the main conflict of the Falklands War in the disabling of the Argentinian submarine Santa Fe and was later promoted rear admiral in 2005. Other members of the ship's crew to feature quite prominently were a Leading Hand named Leading Airman (Aircraft Handler) Sandy Powell (who was shown getting into trouble for not displaying the required level of responsibility), Fleet Master-at-Arms Tom Wilkinson and the Ship's Padre.

=== Aftermath ===
The series won Best Factual Series at the 1977 British Academy Awards, while episode 3 won Best Factual Programme and was repeated. The whole series was then repeated from 17 June to 19 August 1978, and again from 11 January to 21 March 1984. This second repeat was the conclusion to BBC Two's 'Fly on the Wall' season, and as with The Family, a follow-up programme was transmitted, in this case entitled Sailor: 8 Years On. Shown on 28 March, it featured updates on the lives of the crew members and also showed Ark Royal part-way through scrapping at Cairnryan near Stranraer, Scotland.

== Soundtrack ==
The theme song for the original broadcast is the 1975 number one hit "Sailing" by Rod Stewart, which remains Stewart's biggest-selling single in the UK, with sales of over a million copies. However, the DVD release uses a different version due to copyright issues. Likewise "Shine On You Crazy Diamond" by Pink Floyd was used in the original TV version during sequences showing a live fire exercise featuring Phantom and Buccaneers at the Vieques weapons ranges in Puerto Rico in Episode 7. The DVD substitutes the Pink Floyd track for a smooth jazz composition.

== See also ==
- Carrier another similar documentary about the life on board USS Nimitz
