= Peter Dingemans =

Royal Navy officer

Rear-Admiral Peter Dingemans CB DSO
- Born: 31 July 1935 (age 91); Steyning, West Sussex
- Died: 6 December 2015 (aged 80); Lindfield, West Sussex
- Military career
- Allegiance: United Kingdom
- Branch: Royal Navy
- Service years: 1953–1990
- Rank: Rear-Admiral
- Commands: Chief of staff to the Commander-in-Chief Fleet; Flag Officer Gibraltar; Commodore, Amphibious Warfare; HMS Intrepid; Fishery Protection Squadron; HMS Lowestoft; HMS Berwick; HMS Maxton
- Conflicts: Falklands War
- Awards: Companion of the Order of the Bath; Distinguished Service Order

Rear-Admiral Peter George Valentin Dingemans, CB, DSO (31 July 1935 – 6 December 2015) was a Royal Navy officer who was captain of HMS Intrepid during the Falklands War and went on to become Chief of staff to the Commander-in-Chief Fleet.

== Naval career ==
Educated at Brighton College, Dingemans joined the Royal Navy in 1953 serving on HMS Vanguard the last British battleship before being promoted to lieutenant in 1958. In 1967 he took command of the minesweeper HMS Maxton. After being promoted to commander in 1971 he became Commanding Officer of the frigates HMS Berwick and then HMS Lowestoft. Dingemans was promoted to captain in 1976, and led the Fishery Protection Squadron.

In 1980 he took command of HMS Intrepid which was saved from defence cuts to take a key role in the Falklands War and especially the landings at San Carlos Water. For this he was awarded the Distinguished Service Order. He then was appointed Commodore, Amphibious Warfare. In 1985 he was promoted to Rear-admiral and served as Flag Officer Gibraltar and then Chief of staff to the Commander-in-Chief Fleet. He was made a Companion of the Order of the Bath shortly before retiring in 1990. In retirement he spent 10 years with Slaughter & May and wrote a memoir 'My Incredible Journey - From Cadet to Command'.

Military offices
Preceded by Robin I.T. Hogg	Chief of staff to the Commander-in-Chief Fleet; 1988–1989	Succeeded by Sir Roy Newman
Preceded by George Vallings	Flag Officer Gibraltar; 1985–1987	Succeeded by the Hon. Nicholas J. Hill-Norton
Preceded by Michael Clapp	Commodore, Amphibious Warfare; 1983–1985	Succeeded by John Garnier
