= Chief of Staff Fleet =

Office of the Chief of Staff, Fleet
- Ensign of the Royal Navy
- Ministry of Defence
- Reports to: Commander-in-Chief Fleet
- Nominator: Secretary of State for Defence
- Appointer: Prime Minister; Subject to formal approval by the Queen-in-Council
- Term length: Not fixed (typically 1–3 years)
- Inaugural holder: Vice-Admiral, John Ernle Pope
- Formation: 1971-2012

The Chief of Staff, Fleet (COSFLEET) also formally known as Chief of Staff to the Commander-in-Chief Fleet was a senior British Royal Navy appointment. The office holder was the Commander-in-Chief, Fleet's principal staff officer responsible for coordinating the supporting staff of Fleet Headquarters, Northwood, from November 1971 to February 2012.

== History ==
Between 1954 and 1971 Royal Navy senior commands were either abolished or merged into fewer but larger commands. In November 1971, the Western Fleet was merged with the Far East Fleet to form a single seagoing command, commonly known as Fleet Command or the FLEET. The Chief of Staff Fleet was the principal staff officer of the Commander-in-Chief, Fleet's who was responsible for coordinating the supporting senior staff of Fleet Headquarters until April 2012 when the post was abolished.

From February 1990 until April 2012 the office holder simultaneously held the joint title of Deputy Commander in Chief, the Fleet.

== Chiefs of Staff, Fleet ==
Post holders included:

	Rank	Flag	Name	Term
Chief of Staff, Fleet
1	Vice-Admiral	Vice-Admiral - Royal Navy	John Ernle Pope	November 1971- May 1974
2	Rear-Admiral	Rear-Admiral - Royal Navy	John O Roberts	May 1974-April 1976
3	Vice-Admiral	Vice-Admiral - Royal Navy	Peter E.C. Berger	April 1976-October 1978
4	Vice-Admiral	Vice-Admiral - Royal Navy	William D.M. Staveley	October 1978-June 1980
5	Vice-Admiral	Vice-Admiral - Royal Navy	Sir David J. Hallifax	June 1980-May 1982
6	Vice-Admiral	Vice-Admiral - Royal Navy	Sir Edward R. Anson	May 1982-June 1984
7	Vice-Admiral	Vice-Admiral - Royal Navy	Sir John M. Webster	June 1984-November 1986
8	Rear-Admiral	Rear-Admiral - Royal Navy	Robin I.T. Hogg	November 1986-December 1987
9	Rear-Admiral	Rear-Admiral - Royal Navy	Peter G.V. Dingemans	December 1987-February 1990
10	Vice-Admiral	Vice-Admiral - Royal Navy	Sir Roy Newman	Feb 1990–June 1992
11	Rear-Admiral	Rear-Admiral - Royal Navy	Sir Geoffrey Biggs	June 1992–June 1994
12	Vice-Admiral	Vice-Admiral - Royal Navy	Sir Jonathan Tod	June 1994–June 1997
13	Vice-Admiral	Vice-Admiral - Royal Navy	Sir Jeremy Blackham	June 1997–Jan 1999
14	Vice-Admiral	Vice-Admiral - Royal Navy	Sir Fabian Malbon	Jan 1999–May 2001
15	Vice-Admiral	Vice-Admiral - Royal Navy	Sir Jonathon Band	May 2001–July 2002
16	Vice-Admiral	Vice-Admiral - Royal Navy	Sir Mark Stanhope	July 2002–June 2004
17	Vice-Admiral	Vice-Admiral - Royal Navy	Sir Timothy McClement	June 2004–Oct 2006
18	Vice-Admiral	Vice-Admiral - Royal Navy	Paul Boissier	Oct 2006–July 2009
19	Vice-Admiral	Vice-Admiral - Royal Navy	Sir Richard Ibbotson	July 2009–Jan 2011
20	Vice-Admiral	Rear-Admiral - Royal Navy	Sir George Zambellas	Jan 2011–Dec 2011
21	Vice-Admiral	Vice-Admiral - Royal Navy	Philip Jones	Dec 2011–April 2012
