= Dennis Cambell =

Royal Navy Rear Admiral (1907–2000)

Rear-Admiral Dennis Campbell CB DSC
- Born: 13 November 1907; Southsea, Hampshire, England
- Died: 6 April 2000 (aged 92)
- Military career
- Allegiance: United Kingdom
- Branch: Royal Navy
- Service years: 1925–1960
- Rank: Rear-Admiral
- Commands: HMS Ark Royal (1954–56); HMS Tintagel Castle (1947–48); 803 Naval Air Squadron (1938–40)
- Conflicts: Second World War
- Awards: Companion of the Order of the Bath; Distinguished Service Cross; Officer of the Legion of Merit (United States)

Rear-Admiral Dennis Royle Farquharson Cambell, CB, DSC (13 November 1907 – 6 April 2000) was a flag officer of the Royal Navy, who invented the angled flight deck.

== Naval career ==
Educated first Edinburgh House School, (now Ballard School) then at Westminster School, Cambell was a Special Entry Cadet from 1925 in the training ship HMS Thunderer.

From 15 September 1926, Cambell served as a midshipman on HMS Repulse (in the Battle Cruiser Squadron of the Atlantic Fleet). Having been made acting sub-lieutenant at the start of 1929, he started lieutenants courses at the Royal Naval College, Greenwich, and continued from 12 August 1929 at Portsmouth. As sub-lieutenant he joined the destroyer, HMS Sesame, Atlantic Fleet, on 23 March 1930. From September 1930 to the following August he was based at RAF Leuchars, having been made lieutenant in December 1930.

Cambell left the course early to join 405 Flight (equipped with Fairey Flycatchers) in July 1931 at Hal Far (Malta) then to HMS Glorious. In November 1932 they disembarked to RAF Netheravon. The following January he joined 401 Flight (Flycatchers) in HMS Furious which subsequently disbanded into in 801 Naval Air Squadron (Flycatchers) at Netheravon. In December that year he joined 800 Squadron (Nimrods) at Netheravon and they embarked in HMS Courageous on 20 February 1934. In April 1936 he joined the twin-screw minesweeper, HMS Alresford as First Lieutenant (second-in-command). In 1938 he joined the newly formed 803 Squadron (Osprey IIIs) at RAF Worthy Down.

Cambell served in the Second World War, initially as Commanding Officer of 803 Naval Air Squadron, now with Blackburn Skua IIs instead of Ospreys. On 14 September 1939 they lost two Skuas from the sub-flight he was leading whilst attacking U-30 and on 26 September they shot down a Dornier Do 18, this being the first German aircraft to be shot down during the Second World War by any British aircraft.

In June 1940 Cambell became a test pilot at the Aeroplane and Armament Experimental Establishment (A&AEE) at RAF Boscombe Down. February 1942 saw him transferred to HMS Argus as lieutenant commander (flying) until July when he was appointed to HMS President for duty with Ministry of Aircraft Production. While there he was called upon to test fly and deck-land the Firebrand with which Blackburn test pilots were having difficulties. After promotion to commander in December 1942, he was appointed the following March to HMS Saker as Senior Naval Representative to the British Air Commission, Washington D.C.

After the war Cambell was appointed to the Naval Staff in the Admiralty in the Naval Air Warfare and Flying Training Division. In 1947 he was back at sea firstly as Commander (Air) on HMS Glory in the Far East Fleet, and then in December that year to HMS Tintagel Castle, working out of Portland for the Anti-Submarine School. In December 1948 he was promoted to captain, and in 1950 he was once again assigned to HMS President "for miscellaneous services", which meant that he was working at the Ministry of Supply. It was during this period that he devised the angled flight deck working in collaboration with Lewis Boddington of RAF Farnborough.

In September 1954 Cambell was appointed as the first captain of the new carrier HMS Ark Royal, which was commissioned in February 1955. In September 1956 he was again at the Admiralty this time as Director of Naval Air Warfare.

Cambell's final appointment was as Flag Officer, Flying Training at Yeovilton (HMS Heron) from 15 October 1957. In 1958 he was made an Officer of the American Legion of Merit and in 1960, on retirement, he was appointed a Companion of the Order of the Bath (London Gazette 1.1.60; Investiture 9.2.60.) From 19 October 1960 he was in the Retired List. On retirement he became European Sales Director for Hiller and then Hughes Helicopters, and then Director of Executive Travel.
