= Edward Anson (Royal Navy officer) =

Royal Navy Admiral (1929–2014)

Vice-Admiral Sir Edward Anson KCB
- Born: 11 May 1929; Adelaide, Australia
- Died: 22 September 2014 (aged 85)
- Relatives: George Anson, 1st Baron Anson
- Military career
- Allegiance: United Kingdom
- Branch: Royal Navy
- Service years: 1943–1984
- Rank: Vice-Admiral
- Commands: Chief of Staff to the Commander-in-Chief Fleet (1982-1984); Flag Officer Naval Air Command (1979 – 1982); HMS Ark Royal (1976–78); HMS Juno(1974–76); 4th Frigate Squadron(1974–76); HMS Eskimo (1964); 801 Naval Air Squadron (1962–64)
- Conflicts: Korean War Suez Crisis
- Awards: Knight Commander of the Order of the Bath

Vice-Admiral Sir Edward Rosebery Anson, KCB (11 May 1929 – 22 September 2014) was a Royal Navy officer, test pilot and the final captain of HMS Ark Royal.

== Naval career ==
Edward (Ted) Anson was educated in England, Egypt, Kenya and Sudan, before joining the naval college, in 1943.

He then joined the aircraft carrier HMS Implacable as a midshipman before serving in, the battleship HMS Anson named for his distant relative George Anson, 1st Baron Anson. Following this he joined the destroyers HMS Agincourt and HMS Wilton. Anson qualified as a pilot in 1952 and joined 801 Naval Air Squadron on the carrier HMS Glory and saw action in the Korean War, becoming a flight leader in 807 Naval Air Squadron with the carrier HMS Ocean. As senior pilot of 895 Naval Air Squadron flying Hawker Sea Hawks from HMS Bulwark he took part in the Suez Crisis in 1956.

Anson attended the Empire Test Pilot School in 1957, and went on to fly Supermarine Scimitar jets in 803 Naval Air Squadron, the first Scimitar squadron, embarked on HMS Victorious.

He was promoted to commander in 1964, and took command of the frigate HMS Eskimo then served as commander at RNAS Lossiemouth, and in HMS Eagle. Anson was promoted to captain in June 1971 and served as naval and air attaché to Japan and South Korea.

His next role was to command the frigate HMS Juno and the 4th Frigate Squadron. In 1976 he became the final captain of HMS Ark Royal.

He became the flag officer Naval Air Command at HNAS Yeovilton as a rear-admiral in 1980. He was promoted to vice-admiral in 1982 and served as chief of staff to the Commander-in-Chief Fleet at fleet headquarters at Northwood Headquarters. He retired from the Navy in 1984.
