= Slipstreem =

British musical duo

- Origin: United Kingdom
- Genres: Rave
- Years active: 1992–93
- Past members: Steve Moore; Justin O'Neale; Stone

Slipstreem was an electronic music production duo of Steve Moore and Justin O'Neale, who had a UK top 20 hit single in 1993.

== History ==
The duo only produced one single, a rave cover version of the Rod Stewart hit "Sailing", under the title "We Are Raving - The Anthem". The single was recorded at Les Adams' LA Mix studios in Buckinghamshire and was the only release on Boogie Food Records, a sub-label of Island Records. The vocals were done by session singer Stone, who had previously had success as a backing singer with Cliff Richard, including on his number 1 hit "Saviour's Day".

The single entered the UK singles chart just before Christmas 1992, and rose to its peak at no. 18 in the second week in 1993. The group performed the song on Top Of The Pops that week; it was the last rave song to be performed on the show.
