= John Roberts (Royal Navy officer) =

British navy admiral (1924–2025)

Rear-Admiral John Roberts CB
- Born: 4 April 1924; Wales
- Died: 27 December 2025 (aged 101)
- Military career
- Allegiance: United Kingdom
- Branch: Royal Navy
- Service years: 1941–1978
- Rank: Rear-Admiral
- Commands: 803 Naval Air Squadron; HMS St Bride's Bay; HMS Galatea; HMS Ark Royal; Flag Officer Sea Training; Chief of Staff Fleet; Flag Officer, Naval Air Command
- Conflicts: Second World War
- Awards: Companion of the Order of the Bath

Rear-Admiral John Oliver Roberts CB (4 April 1924 – 27 December 2025) was a British Royal Navy officer who served as Flag Officer, Naval Air Command.

== Naval career ==
Educated at the Royal Naval College, Dartmouth, Roberts joined the Royal Navy in 1941 at HMS St Vincent during the Second World War. He was given command of 803 Naval Air Squadron on board the aircraft carrier HMS Eagle in 1957 and of the frigate HMS St Bride's Bay in 1960. He went on to be commanding officer of the Leander-class frigate HMS Galatea in 1966 and commanding officer of the aircraft carrier HMS Ark Royal in 1971. After that he became Flag Officer Sea Training in 1972, Chief of Staff to the Commander-in-Chief Fleet in 1974 and Flag Officer, Naval Air Command in 1976 before retiring in 1978.

== Later life and death ==
Roberts was appointed a Companion of the Order of the Bath in the 1976 New Year Honours. He turned 100 on 4 April 2024, and died at his home on 27 December 2025, at the age of 101.

Military offices
Preceded by Gerard Mansfield	Flag Officer Sea Training; 1972–1974	Succeeded by James Eberle
