= HMS Ark Royal (R09) =

1955 Audacious-class aircraft carrier of the Royal Navy

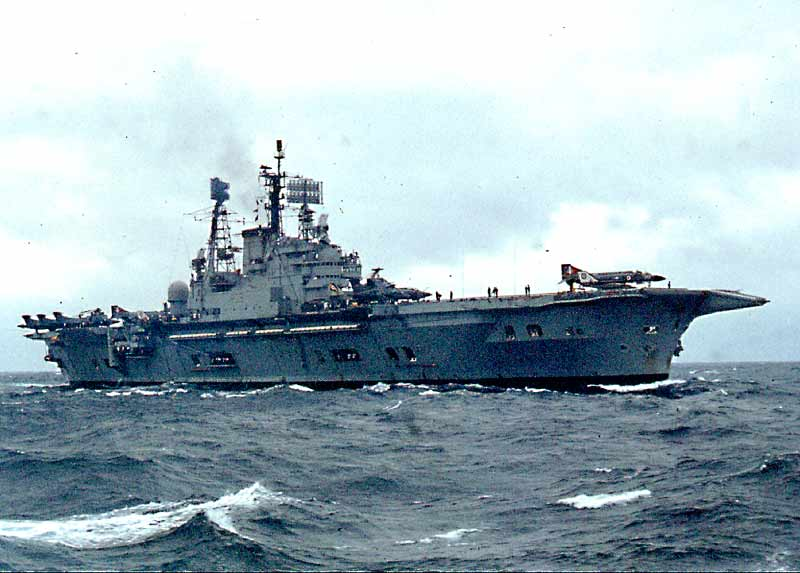
- HMS Ark Royal with Phantom FG1 and Buccaneer S2 aircraft on deck, 1976

History

United Kingdom
- Name: Ark Royal
- Ordered: 18 March 1942
- Builder: Cammell Laird, Birkenhead, England
- Laid down: 3 May 1943
- Launched: 3 May 1950
- Commissioned: 22 February 1955
- Decommissioned: 14 February 1979
- Stricken: February 1979
- Home port: HMNB Devonport
- Identification: Pennant number: R09
- Motto: Desire Does Not Rest
- Nickname(s): The Mighty Ark
- Fate: Scrapped 1980

General characteristics
- Class & type: Audacious-class aircraft carrier
- Displacement: 36,800 long tons (41,200 short tons; 37,400 t) (as built); 43,060 long tons (48,230 short tons; 43,750 t), 53,950 long tons (60,420 short tons; 54,820 t) full load (1978)
- Length: 804 feet (245 m)
- Beam: 112 feet (34 m) (as built); 171 feet (52 m) (1978)
- Draught: 33 feet (10 m) standard; 31 feet (9.5 m) deep
- Propulsion: 8 Admiralty 3-drum boilers in 4 boiler rooms; 4 sets of Parsons geared turbines, 4 shafts; Power: 152,000 shaft horsepower (113,000 kW)
- Speed: 31.5 knots (58.3 km/h)
- Range: 7,000 nautical miles (13,000 km) at 14 knots (26 km/h); 5,000 nautical miles (9,300 km) at 24 knots (44 km/h)
- Complement: 2,250 (2,640 inc. air staff)
- Sensors & processing systems: After 1970: Type 974 Navigation Radar 2x Type 965 Long Range Air Search Radar Type 963 Carrier Controlled Approach Radar Radar types 986 used in sync with 965, 987x2 Fwd and aft height finding, 993 Medium range; all E/F band radars
- Armament: As built: 16 × 4.5 inch (113 mm) guns (8 × 2); 52 × 40 mm Bofors (6 × 6, 2 × 2, 12 × 1); 1969 refit: 4 x Seacat missiles (never fitted); 4x Corvus Decoy launchers
- Aircraft carried: As built: 50; 40 after 1967–1970 refit

HMS Ark Royal (R09) was an Audacious-class aircraft carrier of the Royal Navy and, when she was decommissioned in 1979, was the Royal Navy's last remaining conventional catapult and arrested-landing aircraft carrier. She was the first aircraft carrier to be equipped with an angled flight deck at her commissioning; her sister ship, HMS Eagle, was the Royal Navy's first angle-decked aircraft carrier after modification in 1954. Ark Royal was the only non-United States vessel to operate the McDonnell Douglas Phantom at sea.

== Construction and modifications ==
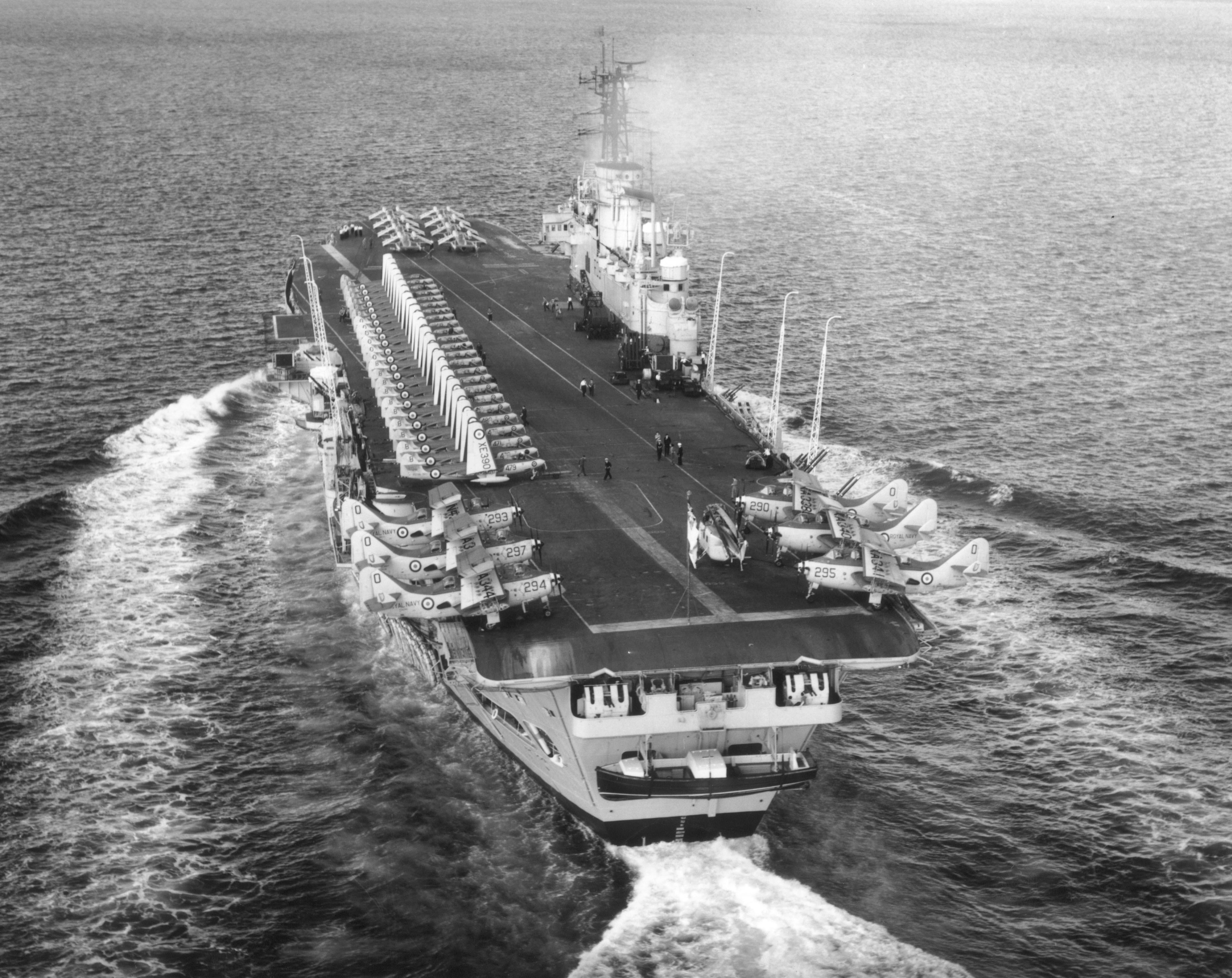
Ark in the late 1950s, before the port deck-edge lift was removed

Ark Royal was the sister ship to HMS Eagle, which was initially named HMS Audacious, hence the name of the class. Four Audacious-class ships were laid down, but two (HMS Africa and the original HMS Eagle) were cancelled when the Second World War ended, and construction of the other two was suspended for several years. Both completed ships were extensively upgraded throughout their lifetimes.

A contract was placed with Cammell Laird on the River Mersey on 19 March 1942, to build the first ship of the class. While it had been originally planned to name the ship Irresistible, this was changed to Ark Royal before ordering to commemorate the aircraft carrier lost in 1941. The ship, which was the largest warship ever to be built by Cammell Laird, was laid down at Laird's Birkenhead shipyard on 3 May 1943, as yard number 1119. Construction was slow, and was suspended after the end of the Second World War to allow the ship's design to be updated to better suit her for the operation of modern aircraft. Ark Royal was launched by Queen Elizabeth, wife of King George VI, on 3 May 1950. She was completed on 25 February 1952, and commissioned the next day at Devonport.

In this time, she underwent redesign and, when completed, she was markedly different from her sister ship. Shortly before her launch from the Cammell Laird shipyard, an image of the ship painted with her white undercoat was captured by the pictorialist photographer E. Chambré Hardman. This has been exhibited many times under the name 'Where Great Ships Are Built' and later 'Birth of the Ark Royal'. When commissioned, she had a 5.5° partially angled flight deck, two steam catapults capable of launching aircraft weighing up to 30,000 pounds (14,000 kilograms), a deck-edge lift on the port side (the first British ship to be fitted with such a device), modified armament, and the new mirror landing system. Ark Royal was the first ship to be constructed with an angled flight deck and steam catapults, as opposed to having them added after launching. These innovations allowed aircraft to land and take off from the carrier at the same time. Her flight deck as built was 800 by 112 feet (244 by 34 metres).

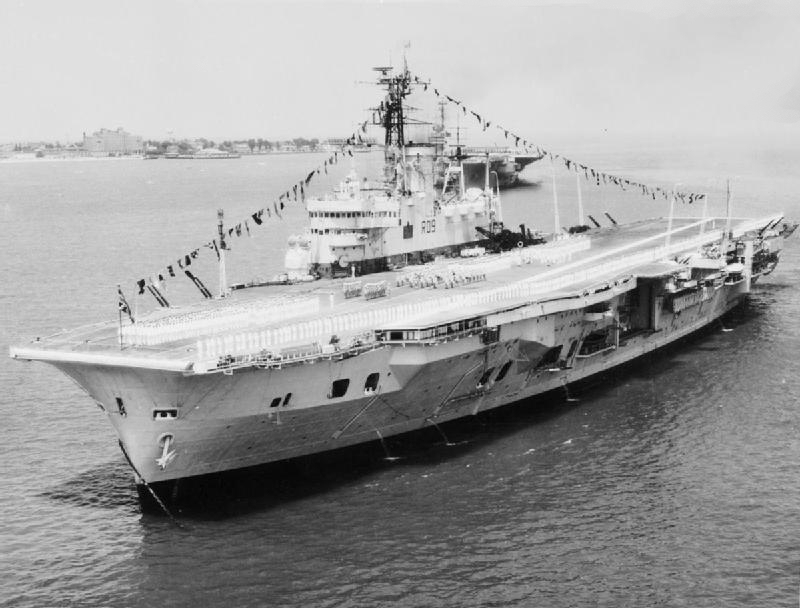
Ark Royal in 1957; a further four years passed before she commenced her sea trials.

About a year after commissioning, her forward port 4.5 inches (110 mm) guns were removed to improve aircraft operations over the angled deck. Four years later, the port deck-edge lift and the forward starboard 4.5 inch guns were also removed. After the 1964 refit, only one twin 4.5 inch gun mount remained aft on port and starboard side. From 1967 to February 1970, she underwent a refit which was a major rebuild to her structure, but only an austere update to her electronic equipment, and was confined to changes needed to operate the RN's version of the Phantom. Prior to, and during the refit, concerns over costs, the age of the hull, and changing political opinions over naval requirements threatened the refit, and even a possibility that the ship could be scrapped. However, convincing arguments to retain and upgrade the carrier won through.

The refit cost around £30 million, far less than the modernisation of Eagle, but also added several improvements, which allowed her to comfortably operate the larger Phantom and Buccaneer Mk.2 aircraft. Her modifications included a full 8.5° angled flight deck, new and far more powerful steam catapults, bridle-catchers, heavy-grade jet-blast deflectors (both of which Eagle did not receive), and heavy-weight arrestor cables. Twelve hundred miles of new cabling was installed, but the ship was not completely rewired and retained old DC electrics. A modified island (with a different arrangement from Eagle), and a partially new electronic suite were also added, though some of her original radars, such as 983 height-finders were retained, and she did not receive the 3-D air-search radar set that her sister had fitted, instead two double-array 966 versions of the standard RN 965 long-range system were fitted and one of the new 986 sets. Significantly, Ark Royal was the first and only RN carrier fitted with a USN carrier approach system, the AN/SPN-35 radar, increasing night aircraft operational capability and safety. Her flight deck size was increased port aft, giving her extra deck-park space for her air group that Eagle did not have. She was also fitted for four Seacat missile launchers, which were never installed, so she emerged from refit with no defensive armament except for Corvus decoy launchers. Significantly, there was little more than an overhaul of her steam turbines and boilers, meaning that mechanically she was very dated; however, the stripping-out of Eagle meant that for a time essential spares were available. Ark Royal was then scheduled for at the most only five years' more service by a new government policy to scrap the carriers by 1975. Intensive maintenance as well as a new programme of continuous servicing and repair (with RN maintenance ships always in her task groups) kept her going until late 1978, though increasing mechanical and electrical failures led to her decommissioning in early 1979.

At her entry into service, the ship had a complement of up to 50 aircraft, comprising Sea Hawks, Sea Venoms, Gannets, Skyraiders, and various helicopters. As later aircraft types grew in size and complexity, her air group fell to below 40 when she left service in 1978.

== Operational history ==
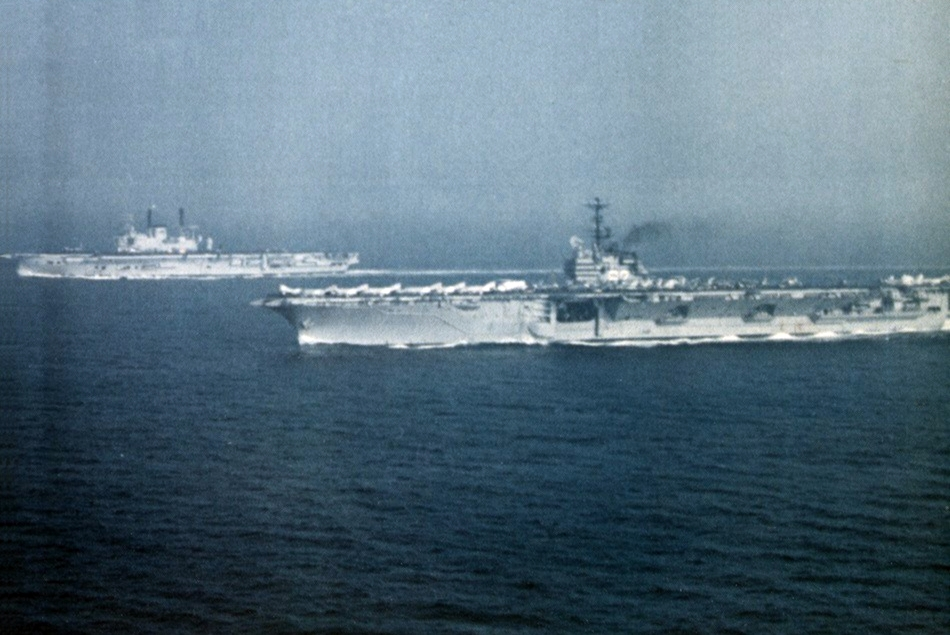
Ark Royal (background) operating with USS Independence (foreground) in the North Atlantic, 1971

Ark Royal participated in many exercises as part of the British fleet and NATO (North Atlantic Treaty Organization) squadrons, but saw no combat duty. She was not involved in the Suez Crisis in Egypt of 1956, about a year after her commissioning; she was on her way there when she ran a main propeller shaft bearing, and had to return to Devonport for a major refit. Eagle replaced her at Suez. In 1963, she carried out trials for a new type of Vertical/Short Take Off and Landing (V/STOL) aircraft, the Hawker P.1127, which later developed into the Hawker Siddeley Harrier. The same aircraft, now having been redesigned and developed as the British Aerospace Sea Harrier, was later accepted as the primary strike capability of the future third and last Ark Royal from 1980 onwards.

She was part of the Beira Patrol enforcing the naval blockade of Rhodesia in 1965. The 1966 Defence White Paper planned the end of British aircraft carriers in the early 1970s, but she went into dock for her refit to head off dockyard redundancies and the likely political issues. A new government re-examined the case for carriers, finding that shore-based aircraft could not provide adequate cover for British concerns 'East of Suez'.

On 9 November 1970, whilst in the Mediterranean to participate in a NATO exercise, Ark Royal collided with Bravyy, a Soviet Navy Kotlin-class destroyer which was shadowing her (a common practice during the Cold War). Ark Royal was slightly damaged, while the Soviet destroyer sustained minor damage and two missing crew. Ark Royal's commanding officer, Captain Raymond Lygo, was cleared of blame at the subsequent court martial.

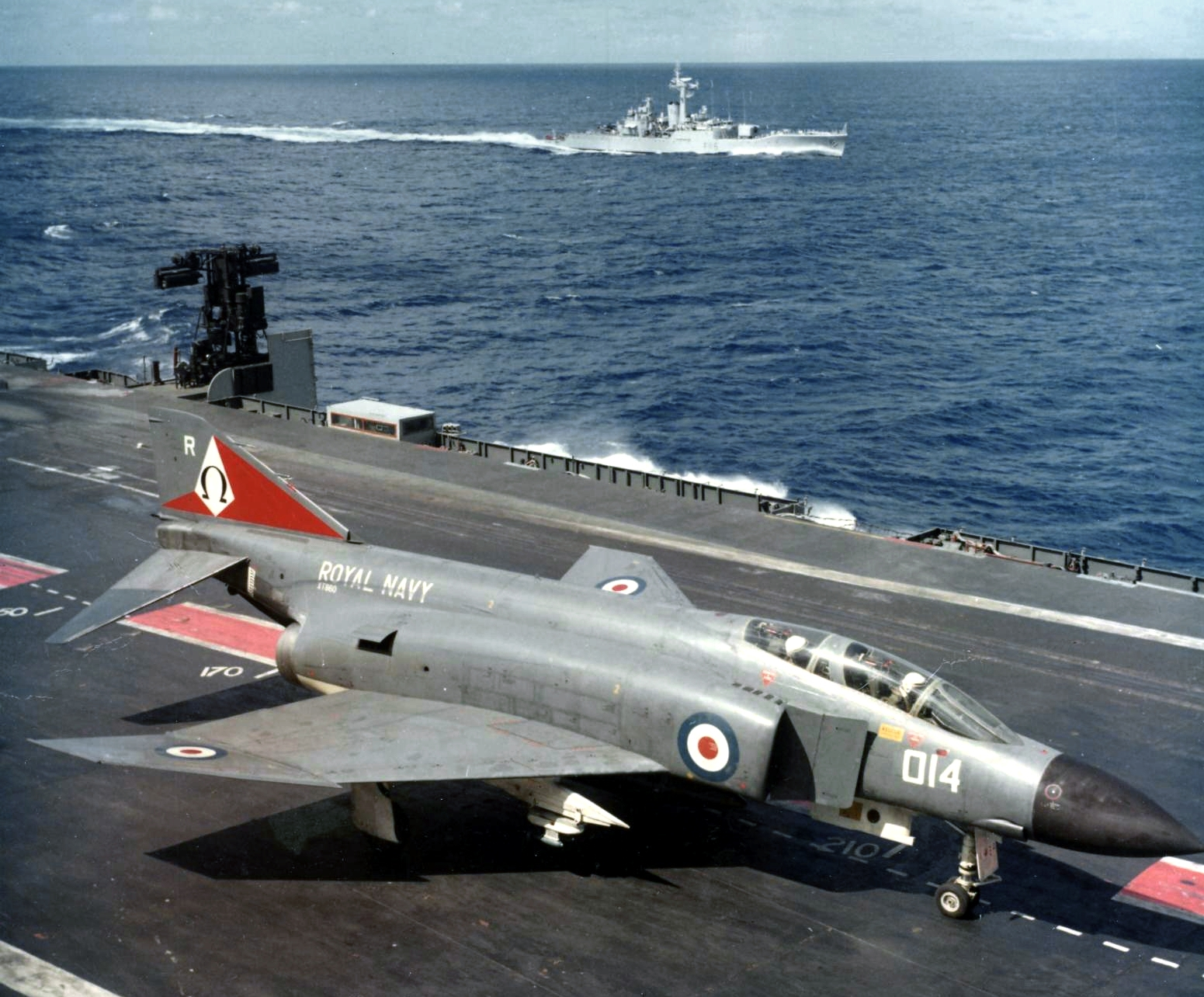
Phantom FG1 on Ark Royal in 1972

The ship featured in the 1960s British television series Not Only... But Also starring Peter Cook and Dudley Moore. When commissions ended, items were fired off the catapult into the sea, including pianos and once a toilet complete with paying-off pennant.

By 1970, Ark Royal had a complement of 39 aircraft. This typically comprised twelve Phantom FG Mk.1s, of 892 Naval Air Squadron, fourteen Buccaneer S Mk.2s of 809 Squadron, four Gannet AEW (Airborne Early Warning) Mk.3s of B Flight 849 Squadron, six Sea King HAS Mk.1s of 824 Squadron, two Wessex HAR Mk.1s of the Ship's Flight, and one Gannet COD Mk.4. later replaced by an AEW3. The Buccaneers doubled as tanker aircraft, using buddy refuelling pods, and as long-range reconnaissance aircraft with bomb bay-mounted camera packs. In July 1976, she represented Britain at the United States Bicentennial Celebration in Fort Lauderdale, Florida.

In 1972, the Buccaneers aboard Ark Royal took part in a long-range strike mission over British Honduras in Central America shortly before its independence as a constitutional monarchy named Her Majesty's Government of Belize to deter a possible invasion by Guatemala, which had long-standing territorial claims.

In 1977, under the flag of Admiral Sir Henry Leach KCB Commander-in-Chief Fleet, Ark Royal led the Royal Navy's tribute to and celebrations of Queen Elizabeth II's Silver Jubilee at Spithead.

In the mid-1970s, the ship made a return to television. A major BBC documentary series, one of the earliest fly on the wall documentaries, Sailor was made, showing life on board the ship during a February-to-July 1976 Western Atlantic deployment. Her commanding officer at this time was Captain Wilfred Graham, a later Flag Officer Portsmouth, and the ship's Commander (executive officer) was Commander David Cowling. The theme tune for the programme was "Sailing" by Rod Stewart – a song that came to be associated with the ship and her successor. She visited Fort Lauderdale, Florida, from 30 May until 14 June 1978.

On Wednesday 21 September 1977, Prince Charles was launched from the catapult, in a Buccaneer.

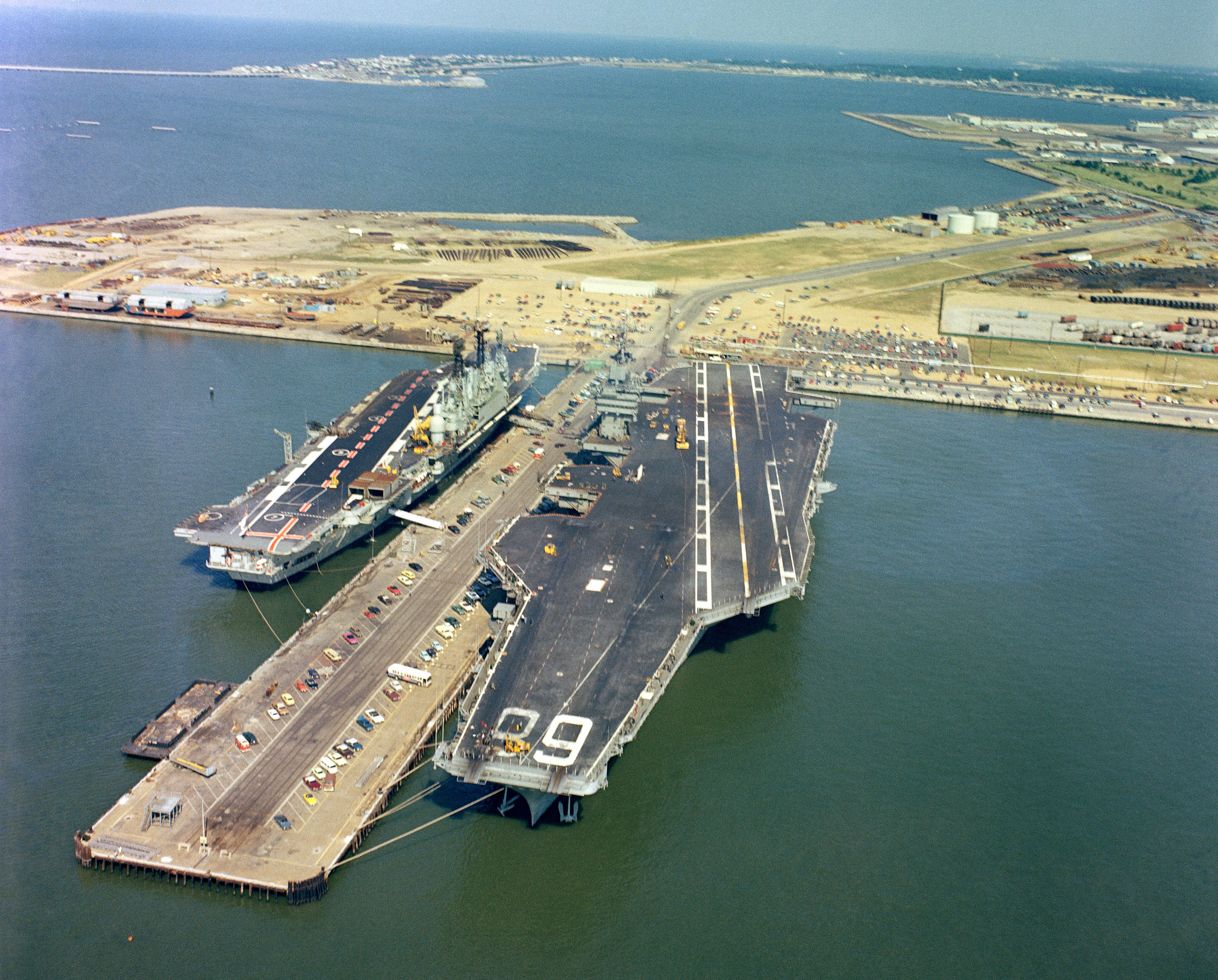
Ark Royal alongside USS Nimitz on a stopover at Norfolk, Virginia, during her final WESTLANT deployment in 1978

She entered HMNB Devonport on 4 December 1978, and was decommissioned on 14 February 1979. Like her sister Eagle, she had a relatively short (24 year) life, and when the White Ensign lowered for the last time, the Royal Navy no longer had fixed-wing aircraft at sea, a situation that persisted until the acceptance into service of HMS Invincible in March 1980 and the completion of the conversion of HMS Hermes to operate the Sea Harrier in mid-1981. On 29 March 1980, the Ministry of Defence (MOD) announced that she would be sold for scrap, and so ended plans to preserve her. She left Devonport on 22 September 1980 under tow, to be scrapped at Cairnryan near Stranraer in Scotland, arriving on 28 September. When arriving at the breakers, her sister ship Eagle was in the final process of being broken up there. Breaking-up of Ark Royal took until 1983. During this period, many former crew travelled to the breakers' jetty at the remote corner of Loch Ryan to pay their last respects; some were reduced to tears when seeing the ship being torn to pieces. However, various parts of the ship remain as souvenirs or memorials; for instance, an anchor (along with an anchor from her sister ship Eagle) outside the Fleet Air Arm Museum at RNAS Yeovilton. One of her other anchors is in Armada Way, Plymouth, near Plymouth Hoe.

Final air wing, 1970 to 1978
squadron	aircraft type	number of aircraft	role
809 NAS	Buccaneer S2	14	strike
892 NAS	Phantom FG1	12	fleet air defence
849B NAS	Gannet AEW3	4	airborne early warning
849B NAS	Gannet COD4	1	carrier on-board delivery
824 NAS	Sea King HAS2	7	anti-submarine warfare
Ship's Flight	Wessex HAS1	2	search and rescue

== Legacy ==
While Ark Royal's career spanned 24 years from the time of her commissioning, she spent as much time in refit; repair and reserve and modernisation as in commissioned service (12 years). It required a lot of effort from her engineers to keep her serviceable between yard periods. Ark Royal had been poorly preserved during her lengthy construction from 1942 to 1955, and much of her machinery was obsolete by her completion, including her dated DC electrics, supplemented later by some AC systems, resulting in a ship that experienced regular defects and mechanical failure. Eagle was a more reliable and well-built ship, and spent far more time at sea than her sister. The scrapping of Ark Royal in 1980, two years after Eagle, marked the end of conventional fixed-wing aircraft operations aboard Royal Navy carriers. She had borne so many innovations, yet her replacement was not equipped with any of these. There was some discussion about preserving her as a museum ship, and some private funds were raised; the MOD would not sanction these efforts. The Fleet Air Arm Museum has subsequently mimicked the ship's island and flight deck in its central hall as an Aircraft Carrier Experience exhibition.

The Centaur-class aircraft carrier HMS Hermes remained in service after her, but had been converted to a helicopter commando carrier in 1971, and then as a V/STOL carrier. The much smaller Invincible-class aircraft carrier could carry only vertical/short takeoff and landing aircraft and helicopters. The two new Queen Elizabeth-class carriers, which were commissioned in 2017 and 2019, were originally designed to operate V/STOL aircraft. Despite expert advice, and in an attempt to reduce costs, the UK government requested that the new carriers be modified to operate conventional CATOBAR (catapult-assisted takeoff and barrier/arrested recovery) aircraft. Fitting electromagnetic catapults would have required huge structural changes and an upgrade of the ships' energy generation, which proved unfeasible, and resulted in a decision to return to the original configuration.

== Aircraft and squadrons ==
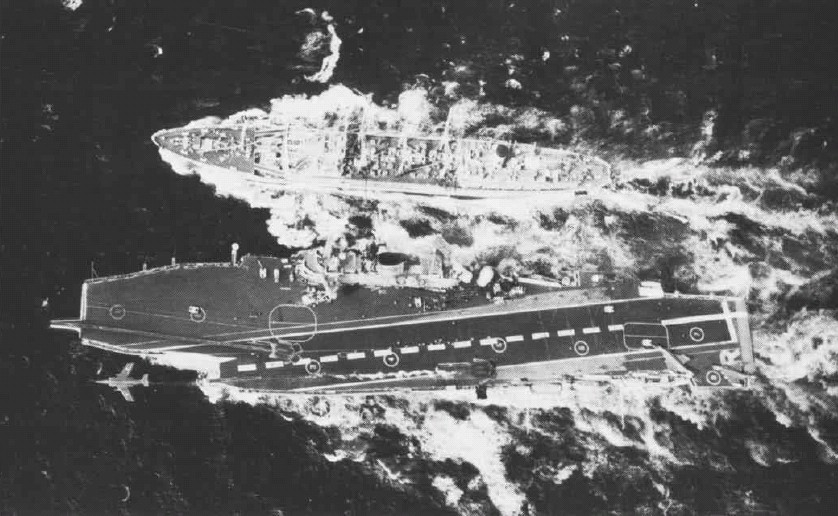
Overhead view of Ark Royal in 1970

- Hawker Sea Hawk
- de Havilland Sea Venom
- Fairey Gannet
- Westland Wyvern
- Grumman Avenger
- McDonnell Douglas Phantom FG1
- Blackburn Buccaneer
- Supermarine Scimitar
- de Havilland Sea Vixen
- Westland Dragonfly
- Westland Sea King
- Westland Wessex

== Commanding officers ==
- 1954–1956: Captain Dennis Cambell RN
- 1956–1958: Captain Frank Hopkins RN
- 1959–1961: Captain Peter Hill-Norton RN
- 1961–1963: Captain Donald Gibson RN
- 1963–1964: Captain Michael Pollock RN
- 1964–1965: Captain Anthony Griffin RN
- 1965–1967: Captain Michael Fell RN
- 1969–1971: Captain Raymond Lygo RN
- 1971–1972: Captain John Roberts RN
- 1972–1973: Captain Desmond Cassidi RN
- 1973–1975: Captain John Gerard-Pearse RN
- 1975–1976: Captain Wilfred Graham RN
- 1976–1978: Captain Edward R Anson RN

== See also ==
- CVA-01
- HMS Queen Elizabeth (R08)

Preceded by 91	HMS Ark Royal; 1955–1978	Succeeded by R07
