= HMS Bristol (D23) =

1973 Type 82 destroyer of the Royal Navy

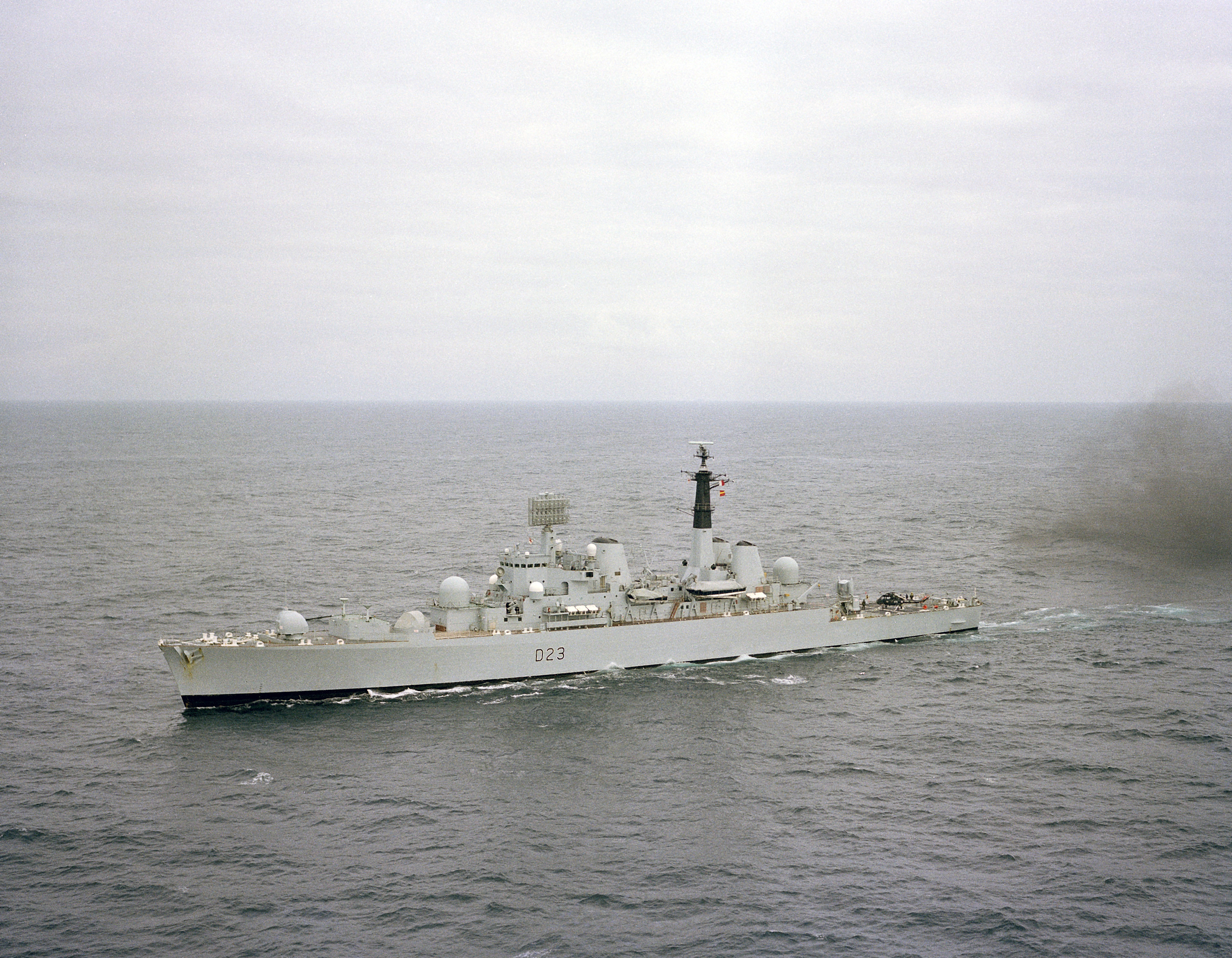
- Bristol in 1982

History

United Kingdom
- Name: Bristol
- Namesake: Bristol
- Ordered: 17 April 1963
- Builder: Swan Hunter, Tyne and Wear, United Kingdom
- Laid down: 15 November 1967
- Launched: 30 June 1969
- Commissioned: 31 March 1973
- Decommissioned: 28 October 2020
- Identification: Pennant number: D23
- Honours and awards: Falklands 1982
- Fate: Scrapped 2025
- Badge

General characteristics
- Class & type: Type 82 destroyer
- Displacement: 6,300 tons (standard), 7,100 tons (full)
- Length: 155 m (507 ft)
- Beam: 17 m (55 ft)
- Draught: 7.5 m (24 ft 7 in)
- Propulsion: COSAG, 2 standard range geared steam turbines 30,000 hp (22,000 kW); 2 Bristol-Siddeley Olympus TM1A gas turbines 30,000 hp, 2 shafts, 2 boilers
- Speed: 28 knots (52 km/h)
- Range: 5,750 nautical miles (10,650 km) at 18 knots (33 km/h)
- Complement: 397 (30 officers)
- Sensors & processing systems: ADAWS-2 combat direction system Type 965 air search radar (until 1984) Type 1022 2D air search radar (from 1984) Type 992Q low-angle search radar 2x Type 909 Sea Dart target illumination Type 978 navigation radar Type 170 search sonar Type 184 target indication sonar
- Electronic warfare & decoys: UAA1 Corvus chaff launcher (from 1979) Mark 36 SRBOC (from 1982)
- Armament: 4.5-inch Mark 8 naval gun; GWS 30 Sea Dart SAM launcher (38 rounds + 10 additional warheads); Ikara A/S launcher (at least 24 rounds)(until 1984); Mark 10 'Limbo' A/S mortar (until 1979); 2 × twin Oerlikon/BMARC GCM-A03 30 mm guns (from 1983); 2 × Oerlikon/BMARC GAM-B01 20 mm guns (from 1983); 2 × Oerlikon 20 mm guns (from 1979)
- Aircraft carried: None (able to support heavy lift helicopters)
- Aviation facilities: Flight deck added when Limbo removed and mortar well plated over

HMS Bristol (D23) was a Type 82 destroyer, the only vessel of her class to be built for the Royal Navy. Bristol was intended to be the first of a class of large destroyers to escort the CVA-01 aircraft carriers projected to come into service in the early 1970s, but the rest of the class and the CVA-01 carriers were cancelled as a result of the 1966 Defence White Paper which cut defence spending.

Following a long career that included the Falklands War, she was converted into a training ship in 1987. While part of the Dartmouth training squadron, she suffered a boiler explosion in 1991 that damaged the vessel beyond economical repair. No longer having enough value to be sold to another navy, she became a Harbour Training Ship at HMS Excellent. She was decommissioned in Portsmouth on 28 October 2020, and her ship's bell was given to the Lord Mayor's Chapel in Bristol where it can be seen when the chapel is open. She was sold for scrap in 2024, with scrapping taking place in 2025.

== Origin ==
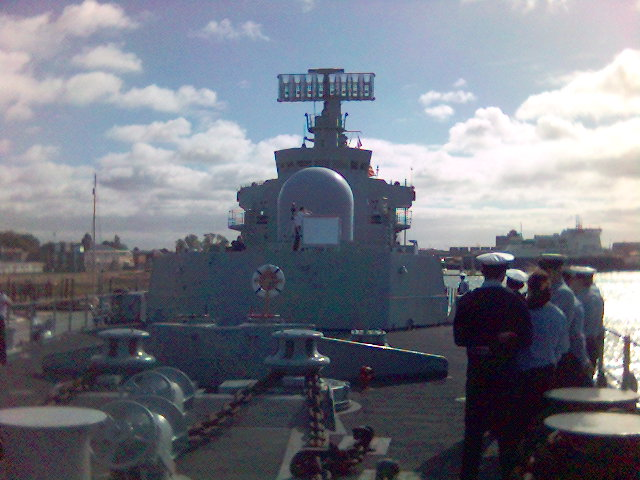
On board HMS Bristol, 2005

The CVA-01 fleet aircraft carrier was designed to replace the World War II vintage aircraft carriers of the Royal Navy. The first plans were for two carriers and to protect these carriers four new Type 82 area air defence destroyers (Note: Although the 1980-81 edition of Jane's Fighting Ships shows her as a light cruiser.) were to be built. In 1963, the Minister of Defence Peter Thorneycroft announced in Parliament that one new aircraft carrier would be built, at an estimated cost of £56 million. However, a change of government and competition from the Royal Air Force (the RAF and Navy were both expected to use the Hawker P.1154 supersonic V/STOL aircraft, a larger version of the Hawker Siddeley Harrier) saw the project being cancelled in the 1966 Defence White Paper. This eliminated the requirement for the Type 82 class destroyer. However, one vessel of the original four was ordered on 4 October 1966 for use as a testbed for new technologies. HMS Bristol was launched in 1969, with four new weapons and electronics systems.

== Construction ==
Bristol's hull was laid down by Swan Hunter & Tyne Shipbuilders Ltd on 15 November 1967. She was launched on 30 June 1969, accepted into service on 15 December 1972 and then commissioned on 31 March 1973. Her estimated building cost was £24,217,000.

== Weapon systems ==
Bristol saw a number of new systems introduced into the Navy, including the Sea Dart anti-aircraft and Ikara anti-submarine missile systems and was the first Royal Navy ship to carry the 4.5 inch (113 mm) Mk 8 gun. Another addition to the fleet was the new advanced Action Data Automated Weapons System Mk.2 (ADAWS-2), a computer system designed to coordinate the ship's weapons and sensors. ADAWS-2 was a large advance on the rudimentary action information system of its predecessor the County-class destroyers, which was heavily reliant on manual data input.

The Sea Dart (GWS 30) system comprised a twin-arm launcher on the quarterdeck with a pair of radar Type 909 target illumination sets, an improvement over the single radar Type 901 set of the County design. The second weapon system was the Australian Ikara anti-submarine weapon. Ikara was a rocket-powered carrier that could deliver a small homing torpedo out to 10 miles (16 km) from the ship. The Ikara was complemented by a Mark 10 Limbo anti-submarine mortar.

The single 4.5 inch (113 mm) Mark 8 gun was not intended as an anti-aircraft weapon, and as such had an elevation of only 55°. The weapon was designed specifically for reliability over rate of fire, allowing only a single mounting to be shipped, and the comparatively low rate of fire of 25 rounds per minute was ample for the intended anti-ship and shore-bombardment roles. Bristol, although capable of landing a Westland Wasp helicopter on the quarterdeck, lacked a hangar and aviation facilities and thus had to rely on external air support.

== Active service ==
Dutch newsreel video (English sub) of HMS Bristol visiting Amsterdam in 1973

The role for which Bristol was built never materialised, and she consequently spent most of her service in the 1970s trialling and building up experience using new weapons and computer systems. A major boiler fire in 1974 destroyed the steam plant; however, Bristol was able to operate for a further three years using only her gas plant, demonstrating its flexibility and utility. The steam plant was repaired in 1976. In 1979 she was fitted out for frontline service with ECM, Corvus countermeasures launchers and a pair of World War II-era Oerlikon 20 mm cannon. During this refit the Limbo weapon was removed; its well was later used as a makeshift swimming pool.

=== Falklands War (1982) ===
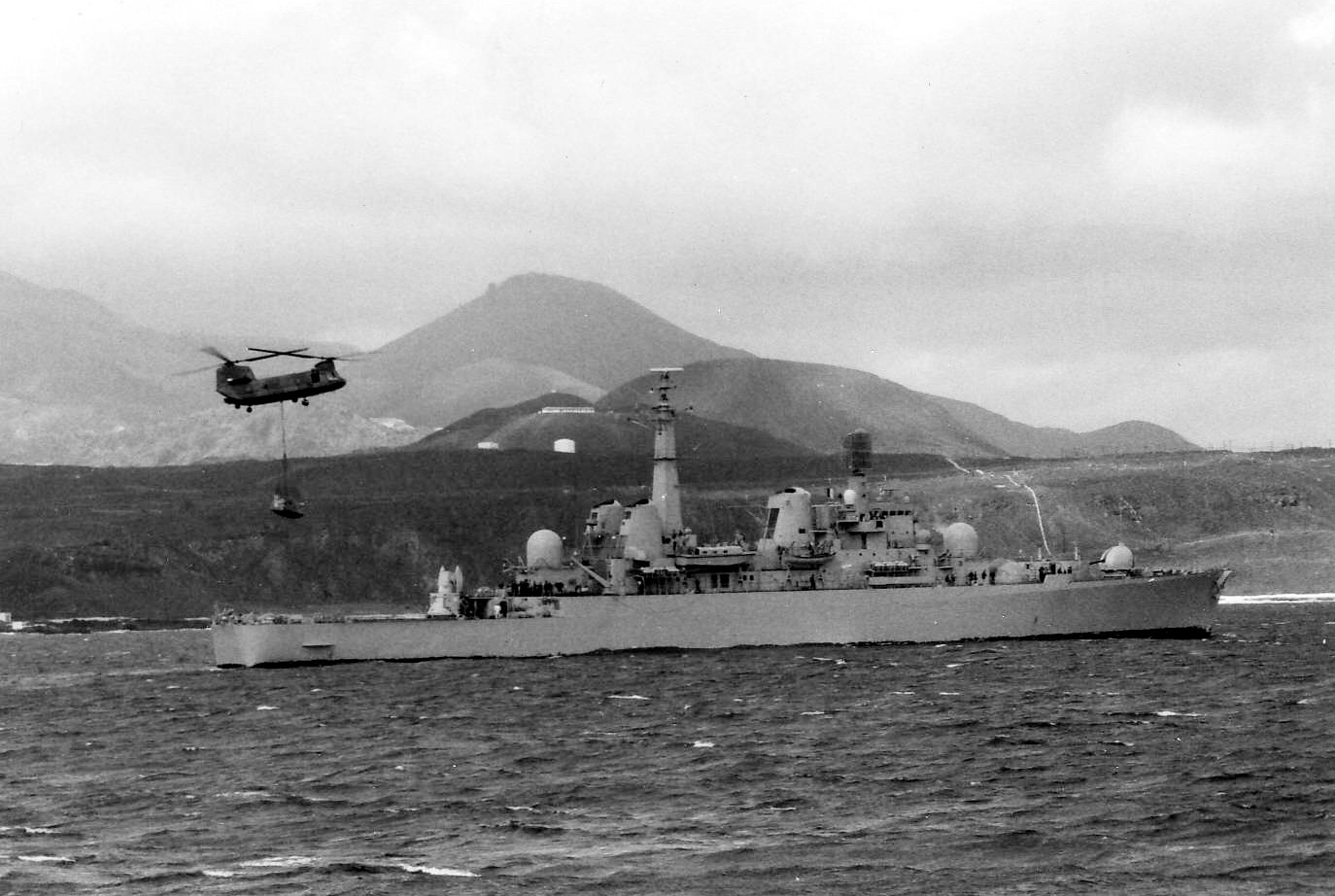
Bristol at Ascension Island with a Chinook helicopter flying overhead in 1982

Bristol was suitable for use as a flagship as she was large enough to embark the extra staff members necessary for this role. She served as the Royal Navy flagship during the 1981 Ocean Safari exercise. After a short refit, during which the mortar well was plated over to allow the landing of large helicopters on the quarterdeck, she joined the Royal Navy task force in the South Atlantic in the 1982 Falklands War. Bristol led the Bristol group of reinforcement ships south and then joined the carrier battle group, Task Group 317.8. On 22 May she fired two Sea Dart missiles at spurious radar returns caused by interference with similar radars fitted on ships within the group. After the destroyer Coventry was hit and subsequently sunk on 25 May, Bristol with Cardiff and Exeter carried out duties in the air warfare role. When the aircraft carrier Hermes, the flagship, returned to the UK, Bristol took over as flagship until 17 September with Vice Admiral Derek Reffell aboard as senior-officer-in-theatre, returning to the UK after being relieved by the carrier Illustrious.

On return to the UK she entered a refit and, in light of the lessons of the conflict, had her light anti-aircraft weapons augmented with a pair of twin Oerlikon/BMARC 30 mm GCM-A03 and a pair of single Oerlikon/BMARC 20 mm GAM-B01 guns. Loral-Hycor SRBOC countermeasures launchers were also added to augment the elderly Corvus launchers.

=== Post-Falklands service ===
With the Royal Navy short on hulls after damage and losses incurred in the Falklands, Bristol remained in commission and made several overseas deployments until paid off for refit in 1984. Another boiler explosion when entering refit caused extensive damage that had to be repaired. The major work undertaken in the refit was to replace the obsolete Type 965 radar with the new Type 1022 for long-range air search duties. The Ikara system was removed; it was intended to replace it with two triple STWS-1 launchers for 324 mm anti-submarine torpedoes, but they were never fitted.

== Training ship ==
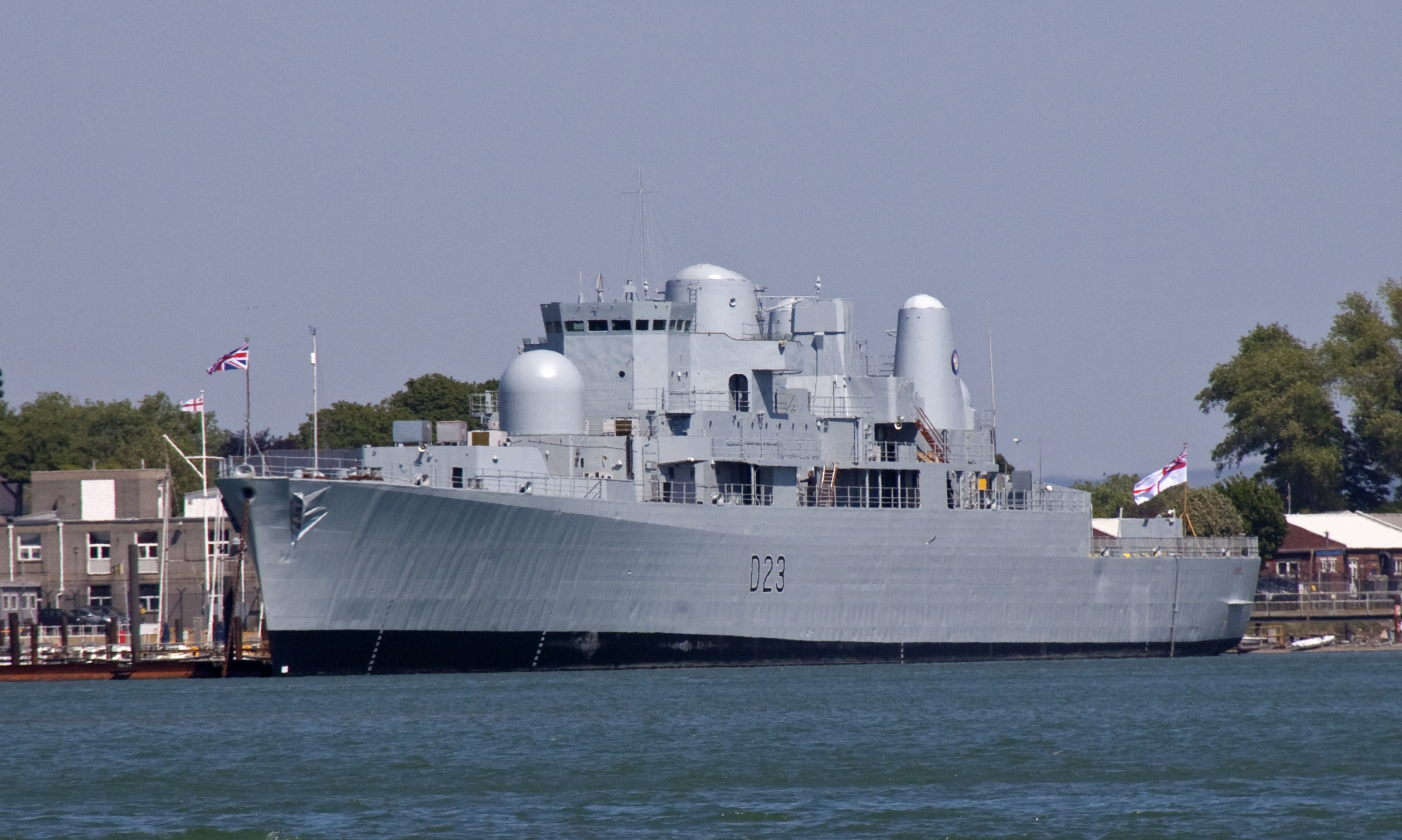
HMS Bristol moored alongside Whale Island, Portsmouth

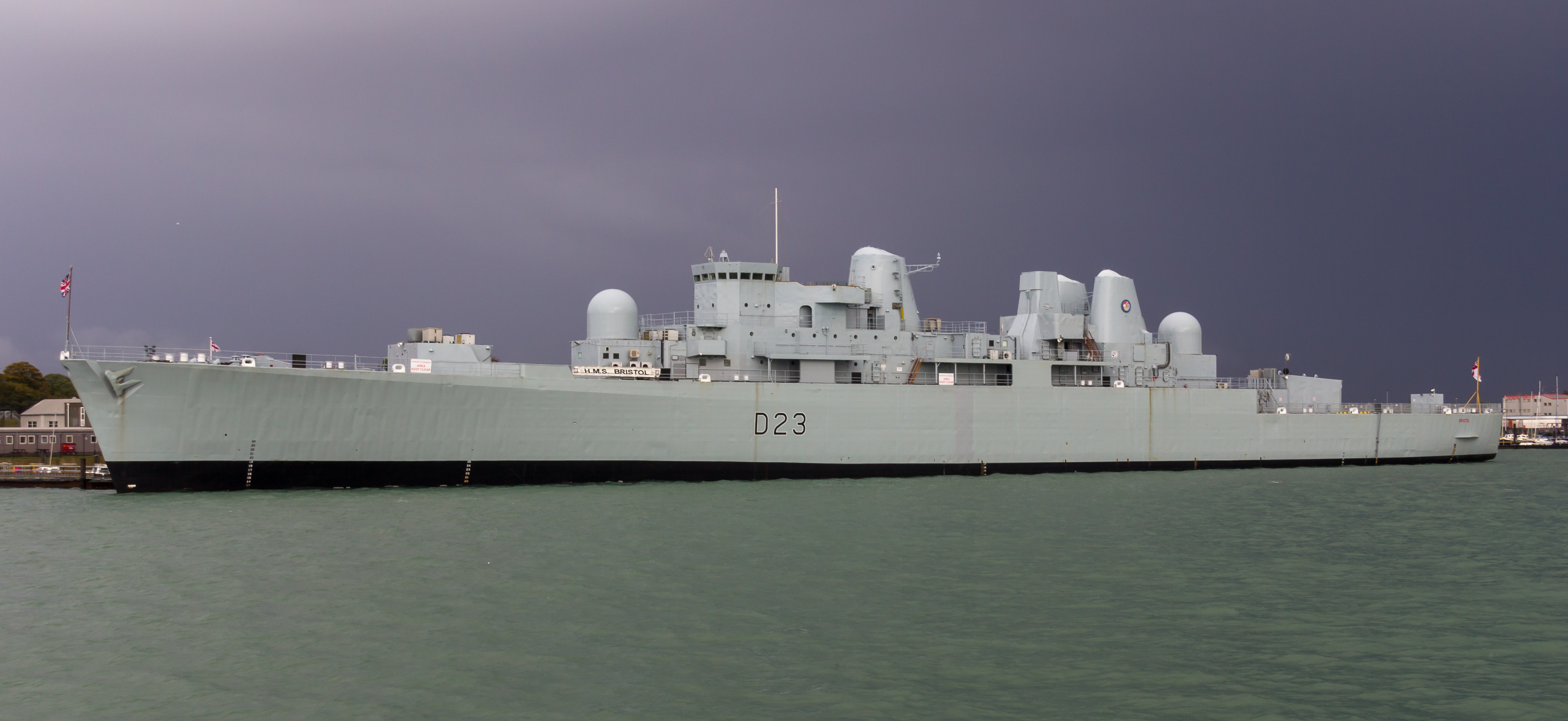
D23 in Portsmouth Harbour in 2013

By the late 1980s the ship was becoming increasingly outdated. As the fleet downsized, maintaining a unique vessel when plenty of other air defence destroyers were in commission no longer seemed worthwhile. HMS Bristol was paid off in 1991 and refitted to replace HMS Kent, as the harbour training ship located at the shore establishment HMS Excellent. Bristol was berthed at Whale Island, Portsmouth and was primarily used as a training ship and accommodation ship for Royal Naval personnel and youth organisations. Many young people from the Sea Cadets, the Combined Cadet Force and the Sea Scouts had their first experience of life on board a warship on Bristol. Air Training Corps and Army Cadet Force units also made use of the facilities. The ship had also been used by a number of colleges running the Edexcel BTEC Public Services course. The ship's company was made up of a mix of Royal Navy and civilian staff. She was also used by the RNVCC cadets during their first wave exercise when the recruits ended their training to become Cadets.

Bristol was refitted at A&P Tyne, Hebburn. The effects of the refit were said to "... extend the service life of HMS Bristol for 10 years". Work was intended to bring facilities on Bristol in line with health and safety standards. The redundant masts containing the ship's Type 1022 and Type 992Q search radars were removed. She departed from Portsmouth on 20 October 2010, and arrived at Hebburn under tow on the morning of 3 November 2010. HMS Bristol left Hebburn in April 2011 to return to Portsmouth.

== Disposal ==
Bristol's role as a training ship ceased on 28 October 2020, with the Ministry of Defence announcing that she would be disposed of. When news of the disposal was made public the leader of Portsmouth City Council Gerald Vernon-Jackson called for Bristol to be maintained as a museum ship within the National Museum of the Royal Navy. HMS Bristol was transferred to the Disposal reserve ships organisation on 1 December 2020, and removed from her Portsmouth mooring in June 2024. She was sent to Aliağa, Turkey for dismantling on 11 June 2025.
