= 1966 Defence White Paper =

Review of the UK defence policy

The 1966 Defence White Paper (Command Papers 2592 and 2901) was a major review of the United Kingdom's defence policy initiated by the Labour government under Prime Minister Harold Wilson. The review was led by the Secretary of State for Defence, Denis Healey. The document was centred on the need to support NATO in Europe and made the commitment that the UK, "would not undertake major operations of war except in co-operation with allies." The 1966 announcements undertook to retain the UK presence in Singapore and Malaysia.

However, the mid-late sixties brought an economic crisis and the devaluation of pound sterling. In 1967 and 1968, the government published two further supplements to the review, announcing the strategic withdrawal of British forces deployed East of Suez. This marked a watershed in British foreign policy and the end of a major, enduring world-wide military role.

== Contents ==
The Wilson Government decided on significant reductions in the defence budget, with defence being the primary target of the government's efforts to reduce public spending due to wider economic problems. The outcome of the Review resulted in cutting a number of significant new capital projects, including the CVA-01 aircraft carrier and all but one of the Type 82 destroyers. This was to be part of a phased removal of aircraft carrier capability. Instead, investment would be made in aircraft including the Harrier, the Anglo-French AFVG (which later came to fruition as the Panavia Tornado) and the American F-111 bomber (the latter following the cancellation of the TSR-2 program).

In order to concentrate forces in Europe in support of NATO, the review also recommended withdrawal of the British presence in Aden. The 1967 supplement added accelerated withdrawals from Singapore, Malaysia, Malta, Libya and the Persian Gulf, reversing the election commitment to retaining an East of Suez military role. The 1968 supplement additionally cancelled the order for the F-111.

== Inter-service rivalry and the defence budget ==
In the early 1960s, the Royal Navy began to plan for new aircraft carriers to replace its aging fleet. The Royal Air Force saw the renewal as a chance to win the budget share which would have been necessary for new carriers. The RAF compiled a history of Royal Navy aircraft carriers and a history of Royal Air Force tactical bombers, comparing the two and finding in favour of bombers. They then submitted this to the Treasury, proposing the TSR-2 tactical strike aircraft in place of the RN's new generation aircraft carriers. Professor Andrew Lambert has described the 1966 Defence White Paper as the 'perfect example of what happens if your enemy knows your history better than you do', with the RAF's projects doing better in the 1966 review than the Royal Navy's.

Dr. Jeffrey Bradford, research director of the United Kingdom Defence Forum wrote a paper as part of a doctoral research programme covering in detail the inter-service rivalry surrounding the procurement effort for the CVA-01 against the backdrop of the defence reviews of the mid 1960s

== Implementation ==
All British forces were withdrawn from Aden by the end of November 1967, despite the ongoing Aden Emergency. Along with the withdrawal from the Persian Gulf, this left bases in Oman as the only UK installations in the Middle East by the mid-seventies. The final installations, the RAF bases at Salalah and on Masirah Island, closed in 1976 following the end of the Dhufar rebellion.

In the Far East, the bulk of British forces left Singapore following a ceremony involving 20 ships including aircraft carrier HMS Hermes in October 1971. Security for Singapore and Malaysia was partially handed to Australian and New Zealand forces as part of the Five Power Defence Arrangements, which are still in place today. The British Far East Command was terminated on 31 October 1971, although a smaller British presence remained in the area until 1976. British forces also remained based in Hong Kong and Brunei.

Both the F-111 order and the AFVG bombers were later cancelled, although the latter evolved into the Panavia Tornado, which was delivered in 1979 and was still in service with the RAF in 2018. One Type 82 Destroyer was built, HMS Bristol, as a test-bed for new technologies. No new large aircraft carriers were built, although naval aviation continued with the construction of smaller Invincible-class aircraft carriers during the 1970s.

== See also ==
- 1957 Defence White Paper
- 1975 Mason Review
