= Type 82 destroyer =

Class of eight Royal Navy warships

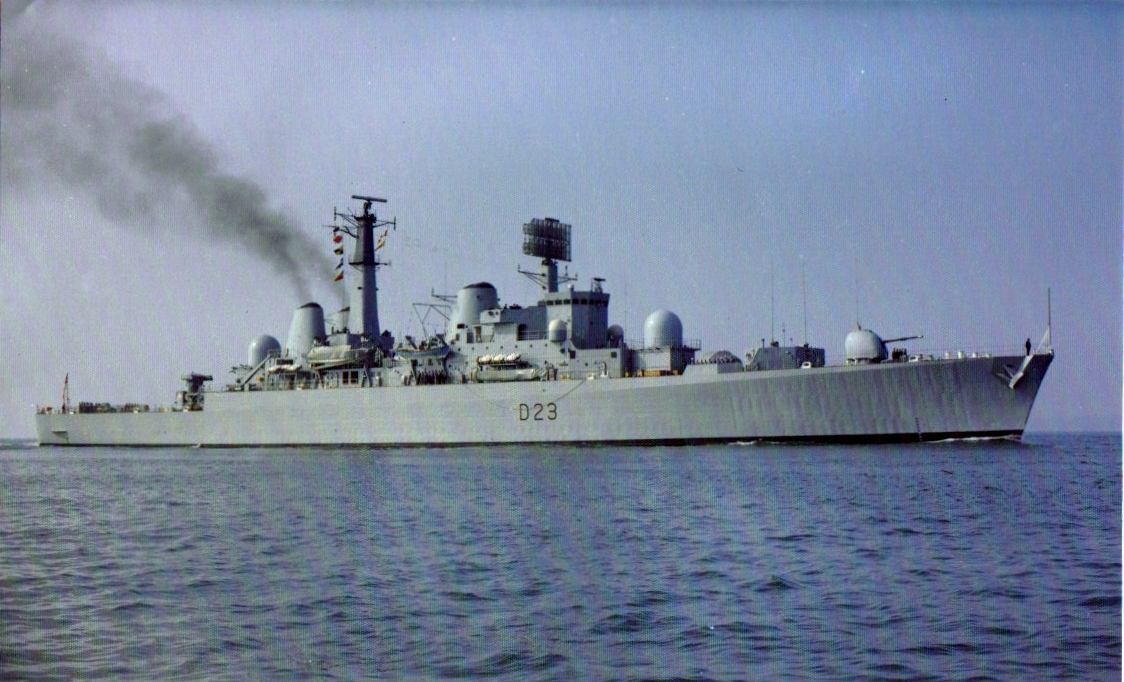
- HMS Bristol

Class overview
- Name: Type 82
- Builders: Swan Hunter
- Operators: Royal Navy
- Preceded by: County class
- Succeeded by: Type 42
- Built: 1967-1969
- In commission: 31 March 1973 – 28 October 2020
- Planned: 8
- Completed: 1
- Cancelled: 7
- Active: 0
- Retired: 1

General characteristics
- Displacement: 6,300 tons (standard), 7,100 tons (full)
- Length: 154.53 m (507 ft 0 in)
- Beam: 16.76 m (55 ft 0 in)
- Draught: 7.5 m (24 ft 7 in)
- Propulsion: COSAG, 2 shafts; 2 boilers, 2 standard range geared steam turbines 30,000 hp (22,000 kW); 2 Bristol Siddeley Olympus TM1A gas turbines 30,000 hp
- Speed: 28 knots (52 km/h; 32 mph)
- Range: 5,750 nmi (10,650 km; 6,620 mi) at 18 knots (33 km/h; 21 mph)
- Complement: 397 (30 officers)
- Electronic warfare & decoys: UAA1
- Armament: 4.5-inch (113mm) Mk 8 gun; GWS 30 Sea Dart SAM launcher (38 rounds + 10 additional warheads); Ikara A/S launcher (at least 24 rounds) (until 1984); Mark 10 'Limbo' A/S mortar (until 1979); 2 × twin Oerlikon/BMARC GCM-A03 30 mm guns (from 1983); 2 × Oerlikon/BMARC GAM-B01 20 mm guns (from 1983); 2 × Oerlikon 20 mm guns (from 1979)
- Aviation facilities: Flight deck

The Type 82 or Bristol-class destroyer was a 1960s guided missile destroyer design intended to replace County-class destroyers in the Royal Navy. Originally eight warships were planned to provide area air-defence for the four planned CVA-01 aircraft carriers. They would also have been able to operate independently as modern cruisers "East of Suez".

Anti-aircraft capability was provided by the new Sea Dart missile system and the class also had anti-submarine capability.

The CVA-01s were all cancelled by 1966, eliminating one of the main roles for the class and removing the need for such a large warship. In its place a smaller design carrying Sea Dart for air defence entered service as the Type 42 class. One Type 82, HMS Bristol, was ordered to act as a testbed for the various technologies to be used on future ships. Sometimes described as a "light cruiser", she was officially classified as a destroyer.

== History ==
The CVA-01 aircraft carrier project was cancelled in the 1966 Defence White Paper, eliminating the requirement for the Type 82 class. Nevertheless, one hull of the original four was ordered on 4 October 1966 for use as a testbed for new technologies. HMS Bristol was laid down in 1967, featuring four new systems:

- The Sea Dart missile that would later be fitted in the Type 42 destroyers and Invincible-class aircraft carriers.
- The Ikara anti-submarine weapon, later fitted to some Leander-class frigates.
- A new 113 mm 4.5-inch Mk 8 gun.
- The advanced Action Data Automation Weapons System Mk.2 (ADAWS-2), a computer system designed to coordinate the ship's weapons and sensors.

The latter feature, although not externally apparent, was perhaps the most pioneering of the design; a leap forward from the rudimentary action information system of the "Counties" and its heavy reliance on manual data input.

The Type 82 was followed into service by the smaller Type 42 destroyer that featured the same Sea Dart missile, 113 mm Mark 8 gun and integrated ADAWS. It was not a direct replacement for the Type 82 per se, but filled the area air defence role in a Cold War, North Atlantic navy. The Type 42 design was however smaller and had a lower manpower requirement and as such many more hulls could be brought into service than a design of the Type 82's size. It also featured a flight deck and hangar for its own air component providing improved anti-submarine, surface-strike and general utility to the design.

== Design ==
The Type 82 was loosely based on the layout of the County-class destroyer and the Type 12I Leander-class frigate (hence the inclusion in the escort Type numbering system.) However the County and Leander designs provided only a limited weapon and command replacement for the war-built cruisers, the last of which had been decommissioned in 1962–65.

The County class depended on data links from the aircraft carriers (Eagle, Hermes and Victorious) equipped with 984 3D radar and ADWAS computers which were able to track 50-100 targets and prioritize targets for fighters, missiles and long range AA. The later Tiger-class cruisers were completed too late with unreliable machinery and automatic guns prone to jamming. The Tigers were inefficient East of Suez and similar problems plagued the last Battle-class and Daring-class destroyers. The Counties had the same obsolescent 4.5-inch guns and Seaslug missile system was now obsolete. Their helicopter facilities were cumbersome and unrealistic for deterrence of Soviet nuclear submarines or even diesel submarines of the Chinese navy and other Far-East nations. The serious naval confrontation between Malaya and Indonesia from 1963 to 1966, showed Asian powers now had jet bombers armed with cruise missiles, and RN carriers with subsonic second generation de Havilland Sea Vixen and Supermarine Scimitar fighters were insufficient. Three of the RN strike carriers in 1963-65 had capacity for only 25 aircraft, which was completely inadequate for the required mix of strike aircraft, fighters, interceptors, tankers, Fairey Gannets and anti-submarine helicopters or aircraft.

Moving the anti-submarine requirement to separate small cruisers or carriers armed with either 4-6 anti submarine helicopters or more reliable dual conventional/nuclear missile anti-submarine missiles such as Ikara or ASROC propelled the development of the Type 82 and the legend was set on 7 July 1965.

Other East of Suez issues in the Gulf and with Egypt, UAE and China and unstated India. Iraq and Iran were also seen as justifying more powerful cruiser substitutes as aircraft carrier complements. As with the County class, gun armament was light, no light AA was included prior to the 1982 Falklands War and the warships were unarmoured. Scantlings, supply and storage capacity was based on destroyer standards as in the preceding Counties. The Type 82 was a much more spacious warship better planned for sustained crew functionality in operational conditions in distant waters.

The vessel was powered by a combined steam and gas (COSAG) plant, and was the last warship designed for the Royal Navy to be powered by steam. The steam plant vented through the large fore funnel while the gas plant exhausted though a side-by-side pair of after funnels (on either side of the extensive air intakes and filters for the gas turbines), giving it a unique three-funnelled layout.

=== Weapon systems ===
The new Sea Dart missile was fired from a twin-arm launcher on the quarterdeck and there was a pair of radar Type 909 target illumination sets, an improvement over the single radar Type 901 set of the County-class design.

The single Mark 8 4.5-inch gun was not intended as an anti-aircraft weapon, and as such had an elevation of only 55°. The weapon was designed specifically for reliability over rate of fire, allowing only a single mounting to be shipped, and the comparatively low rate of fire of 25 rounds per minute was more than suitable for the intended anti-ship and shore bombardment roles.

The third weapon system was the Australian Ikara anti-submarine weapon; a rocket-powered aircraft capable of carrying a Mk.44 homing torpedo or nuclear depth bomb out to 10 miles from the ship. The Ikara was backed up by a Mark 10 Limbo anti-submarine mortar. Although capable of landing a Westland Wasp helicopter on the quarterdeck the ship lacked a hangar and aviation facilities and thus had to rely on external air support.

=== Electronics ===
The original design called for a long-range 3-D air search radar to be fitted; the joint Anglo-Dutch Type 988 "Broomstick", and early drawings and artist's impression show a large dome on the bridge to carry this set. A similar set was to be fitted to the CVA-01 design. However, the RN dropped out of the program due to high cost, and instead she was fitted with the ageing Type 965 air search radar, with a "twin bedstead" AKE-2 antennae, on a stump foremast. Radar Type 992Q low-angle search was carried on the tall, slender mainmast and as such the electronics fit had not advanced significantly from the County class. Type 909 sets were shipped fore and aft for Sea Dart fire control, allowing two targets to be engaged at any one time.

The main advance in the design was with how the sensor data was processed and displayed. The ADAWS-2 system, based on two Ferranti FM1600 computers, integrated the identification, tracking and engagement of targets into a single system. ADAWS-2 could accept input from any of the ship's radars or sonars, identify targets and produce continuous track histories. Using this information it could evaluate threat levels and control the engagement of targets using the relevant weapons systems. The whole process occurred almost automatically, requiring only oversight and command from the human operator. This new generation of warship would be commanded from an operations room within the ship rather than the traditional location of the bridge.

- Electronics:
  - ADAWS-2 combat direction system
  - 1 × radar Type 965 2D air warning, later;
  - 1 × radar Type 1022 2D air search
  - 1 × radar Type 992Q low-angle target indication
  - 2 × radar Type 909 Sea Dart target illumination
  - 1 × radar Type 978 (later 1006) navigation
  - 1 × sonar Type 170 search
  - 1 × sonar Type 184 target indication

== Appraisal ==
Despite introducing various new systems, the role for which Bristol was designed never materialised. She faced the problem of entering a navy that had no operational role or requirement for her and that was faced with rapidly changing priorities. This single, large ship was manpower- and maintenance-intensive and was not fitted out to the standard required for front line deployment.

The major shortcomings in the design were twofold: the lack of an air component and the lack of a long-range anti-ship weapon. Because this class of destroyer was proposed to be deployed alongside the new aircraft carriers, both of these capabilities were intended to be delivered from other components of the carrier battle group. Within a few years these features would be standard on ships of this size and type. These deficiencies limited her to squadron (rather than individual patrol) duties, and Bristol is usually seen as something of a white elephant.

== Service ==
The role which the Type 82 was built for never materialised; Bristol, the only ship built, spent most of her service in the 1970s trialling and building up experience using the new weapons and computer systems. A major boiler fire in 1974 destroyed the steam plant. Older ships might have been crippled by this, but Bristol was able to operate for three years using only her turbine plant, demonstrating the flexibility and utility of the latter. The steam plant was repaired in 1976 and it was not until 1979 that she was fitted out for frontline service with ECM, Corvus countermeasures launchers and a pair of World War II-era Oerlikon 20 mm cannons. During this refit the Limbo weapon was removed; the well subsequently saw service as a makeshift swimming pool.

Thanks to her size, Bristol was suitable for use as a flagship as she could embark the extra staff members necessary for this role. As such, she served as the Royal Navy flagship during Exercise Ocean Safari 81. After a short refit, during which the mortar well was plated over to allow the landing of large helicopters on the quarterdeck, she joined the Royal Navy task force in the South Atlantic in the 1982 Falklands War as a component of the carrier battle-group. After the conflict she remained ‘’in situ’’ as flagship of the remaining Royal Navy forces. On return to the UK she entered a refit and, in light of the lessons of the conflict, she had her light anti aircraft weapons augmented with a pair of twin Oerlikon / BMARC 30 mm GCM-A03 and a pair of single Oerlikon / BMARC 20 mm GAM-B01 guns. Loral-Hycor SRBOC countermeasures launchers were also added to augment the elderly Corvus launchers.

With the Royal Navy short on hulls after damages and losses incurred in the Falklands, Bristol remained in commission and made several overseas deployments until paid off for refit in 1984. Another boiler explosion when entering refit caused extensive damage and had to be repaired. The major work undertaken in the refit was to replace the obsolete radar Type 965 with the new radar Type 1022 for long range air search duties. In addition, the Ikara system was removed and it was intended that it be replaced with two triple STWS-1 launchers for 324 mm anti-submarine torpedoes, although these were never fitted.

In 1987 she became part of Dartmouth training squadron, for which duties she had extra accommodation and classrooms added in the former Ikara and Limbo spaces. Finally she was withdrawn from service on 14 June 1991 and configured for her next role in 1993 to be a replacement for HMS Kent as a static training ship at HMS Excellent, a shore facility in Portsmouth.

As of 28 October 2020, Bristol was decommissioned and in June 2025 was transferred to Turkey to be scrapped.

== Construction programme ==
Pennant	Name	Manufacturers	Laid down	Launched	Accepted into service	Commissioned	Est. building cost	Fate
D23	Bristol	Hull: Swan Hunter & Tyne Shipbuilders Ltd; Main machinery: General Electrical Co Ltd (turbines and gearing); Rolls-Royce (1971) Ltd (gas turbines)	15 November 1967	30 June 1969	15 December 1972	31 March 1973	£24,217,000	Decommissioned 2020; transferred to Turkey in June 2025 to be scrapped

== See also ==
- List of destroyer classes

Equivalent destroyers of the same era

- Mod Kashin class
- Perth class
- Amatsukaze class
- Fante class
- Daegu class
