= CVA-01 =

Unbuilt 1960s class of UK aircraft carriers

- Official drawing of the CVA-01

Class overview
- Operators: Royal Navy
- Preceded by: Malta class (cancelled); Audacious-class fleet carrier; Centaur-class light carrier
- Succeeded by: Invincible class
- Planned: 4
- Canceled: 4

General characteristics
- Displacement: 54,500 long tons (55,400 t) at full load
- Length: 925 ft (281.9 m)
- Beam: 184 ft (56.1 m)
- Draught: 33 ft (10.1 m)
- Installed power: 6 Admiralty boilers; 135,000 shp (101,000 kW)
- Propulsion: 3 shafts; 3 geared steam turbines
- Speed: 30 knots (56 km/h; 35 mph) (Note: Royal Navy speed requirements are given for so called 'deep and dirty' hull conditions (heavily loaded with 6 months of hull fouling) while sailing in the tropics.)
- Range: 7,000 nmi (13,000 km; 8,100 mi)
- Complement: 3,250 plus airgroup
- Armament: 1 × twin Sea Dart launcher with 38 Sea Dart SAM
- Armour: unspecified for side and 1,800lb warhead resistant torpedo defence system of bulkheads and void spaces.
- Aircraft carried: Up to 50 aircraft, with the planned airgroup having 18 × Phantom FG.1; 18 × Buccaneer S.2; 4 × Gannet AEW.3; 4 × Sea King HAS.1; 2 × Wessex HAS.1 (SAR), probably with 1 × Gannet COD.4
- Aviation facilities: 2 × catapults, 2 × lifts

CVA-01 was a proposed United Kingdom aircraft carrier, designed during the 1960s. The ship was intended to be the first of a class that would replace all of the Royal Navy's carriers, most of which had been designed before or during the Second World War. CVA-01 and CVA-02 were intended to replace HMS Victorious and HMS Ark Royal, while CVA-03 and CVA-04 would have replaced HMS Hermes and HMS Eagle respectively.

The planned four carrier class was soon reduced to three before further being reduced to two until finally, following a government review in the form of the 1966 Defence White Paper, the project was cancelled – along with the proposed Type 82 destroyer class, which were intended primarily as escorts for carrier groups. Factors contributing to the cancellation of CVA-01 included inter-service rivalries, the huge financial costs of the proposed carrier against ongoing budgetary constraints, and the technical complexity and difficulties it would have presented in construction, operation, and maintenance. Some historians also cite the increased role played by land-based aircraft in providing a nuclear deterrent and that naval leadership at the time presented their need for the carriers poorly in government.

Had CVA-01 and CVA-02 been built, it is likely they would have been named HMS Queen Elizabeth and HMS Duke of Edinburgh respectively.

== Origin ==
In the 1960s, the Royal Navy was still one of the premier carrier fleets in the world, second only to the US Navy, which was in the process of building the 80,000-ton Kitty Hawk-class aircraft carriers.

The British fleet included the fleet carriers Ark Royal and Eagle, and two smaller carriers, the completely reconstructed Victorious, and the somewhat newer light carrier Hermes, both with 3D Type 984 radar and C3, but limited to air groups of 25 aircraft: at the most 20 fighters and strike aircraft and five helicopters, or alternately 16 fighters and strike aircraft, four turboprop Fairey Gannet AEW, and five helicopters. A fifth carrier, Centaur, was modernised to the minimum standard to operate second-generation Supermarine Scimitars and de Havilland Sea Vixens in 1959, but was never satisfactory or safe for operating nuclear strike aircraft and was a purely interim capability while Eagle was refitting.

While all four of the Navy's large carriers were capable of operating the S.2 version of the Blackburn Buccaneer strike aircraft, only Ark Royal and Eagle were realistically big enough to accommodate both a squadron of Buccaneers (up to 14 aircraft) and a squadron of redesigned McDonnell Douglas F-4 Phantoms, which the Royal Navy intended to procure as its new fleet air defence aircraft. With the remainder of the air group, this would give a total of approximately 40 aircraft, which compared poorly to the 90 available to a Kitty Hawk-class ship. The increasing weight and size of modern jet fighters meant that a larger deck area was required for takeoffs and landings. Although the Royal Navy had come up with increasingly innovative ways to allow ever-larger aircraft to operate from the small flight decks of their carriers, the limited physical life left in the existing ships (only Hermes was considered capable of reliable and efficient extension past 1975), and the inability of both Victorious and Hermes, the most effectively and expensively modernised of the carriers, to operate the F-4 or an effective and useful number of Buccaneers, made the order of at least two new large fleet carriers essential by the mid-1960s.

== Design ==
=== Considerations ===
Once the Chiefs of Staff had given their approval to the idea of new carriers being necessary, in January 1962 in the strategic paper COS(621)1 British Strategy in the Sixties, the Admiralty Board had to sift through six possible designs, created by Project Leader JC Lawrence (1958-1962). These ranged from 42,000 to 68,000 tons at full load. The largest design, based on the American Forrestal class, had space for four full-sized steam catapults but was rejected early on as being significantly too costly, particularly in terms of the dockyard upgrades that would be needed to service them.

The advantages of size were immediately apparent; a 42,000-ton carrier could only hold 27 aircraft, while a 55,000-ton carrier could carry 49 Buccaneers or Sea Vixens. This was an 80% increase in the size of the air group for a 30% increase in displacement. The Board of Admiralty decided in 1961 that the minimum would be 48,000 tons. The carriers would have two main roles: strike carrier (including attacks on airfields) and defence of the fleet. They would also operate early warning aircraft and—later—anti-submarine helicopters. Even with these smaller designs, the cost was a serious issue. The Treasury and the Air Ministry were pushing for a new set of long-range strike aircraft operating from a string of bases around the globe. For the former, this appeared a cost-effective solution for the East of Suez issue, and for the latter, it meant that the Royal Navy would not get a majority of the defence budget.

CVA-01 was also supposed to be able to act as a commando carrier with capacity of 1,125 Royal Marines plus vehicles and 14 Westland Wessex HU.5 in exchange for 4 British Aircraft Corporation–McDonnell-Douglas F-4K Phantom FG.1 and provision to carry aircraft like the cancelled Grumman F-111B Aardvark was built in to the design.

Her underwater protection of bulkheads and void spaced was designed to resist a 1,800 lb warhead charge.

Four ships were planned but the addition of construction of four Polaris missile nuclear submarines (ordered in April 1963) introduced delays of ten months in expected production. Considerations included the availability of berths at shipyards, sufficient trained welders for use of QT35 steel, drawing office capacity at the shipyards, number of electrical fitters. (Note: While an estimated 800 were needed, the largest number employed at any one yard was less than 400) A new dry dock at Portsmouth was also needed.

By July 1963 it was announced that only one carrier would be built, though there was a possibility that one would be ordered by the Australian Navy.

=== Details ===
Official artist's impression of the proposed aircraft carrier.

Louis Rydill took over as Project Leader and lead designer in 1962. His "sketch" approved by the Admiralty in July 1963 was for an 890 ft (270 m), at the waterline, vessel. Three shafts powered by a new steam plant design (Note: 1,000 psi (6,900 kPa) at 1,000 °F (538 °C).) would give 27–28 knots and one shaft could be shut down at a time for maintenance. The electrical distribution system, using step-down transformers from 3.3 kV, was also new to the Royal Navy.

The CVA-01 would have displaced no more than 54,500 tons, with a flight deck length (including the bridle arrester boom) of 963 ft 3 in (293.60 m) and 189 ft (58 m) wide. Overall width was 231 ft 4 in (70.51 m). The size of the flight deck, combined with steam catapults and arrester gear would have enabled the carriers to operate the latest jets. The two 250 ft (76 m) long catapults, which could operate aircraft of maximum weight of 70,000 lb (32 t) were set at 4 degrees apart. There were four take-off positions to operate V/STOL aircraft.

Initially, no armour was planned but was added to the magazines, ship sides, and hangar bringing displacement up to 54,500 tons.

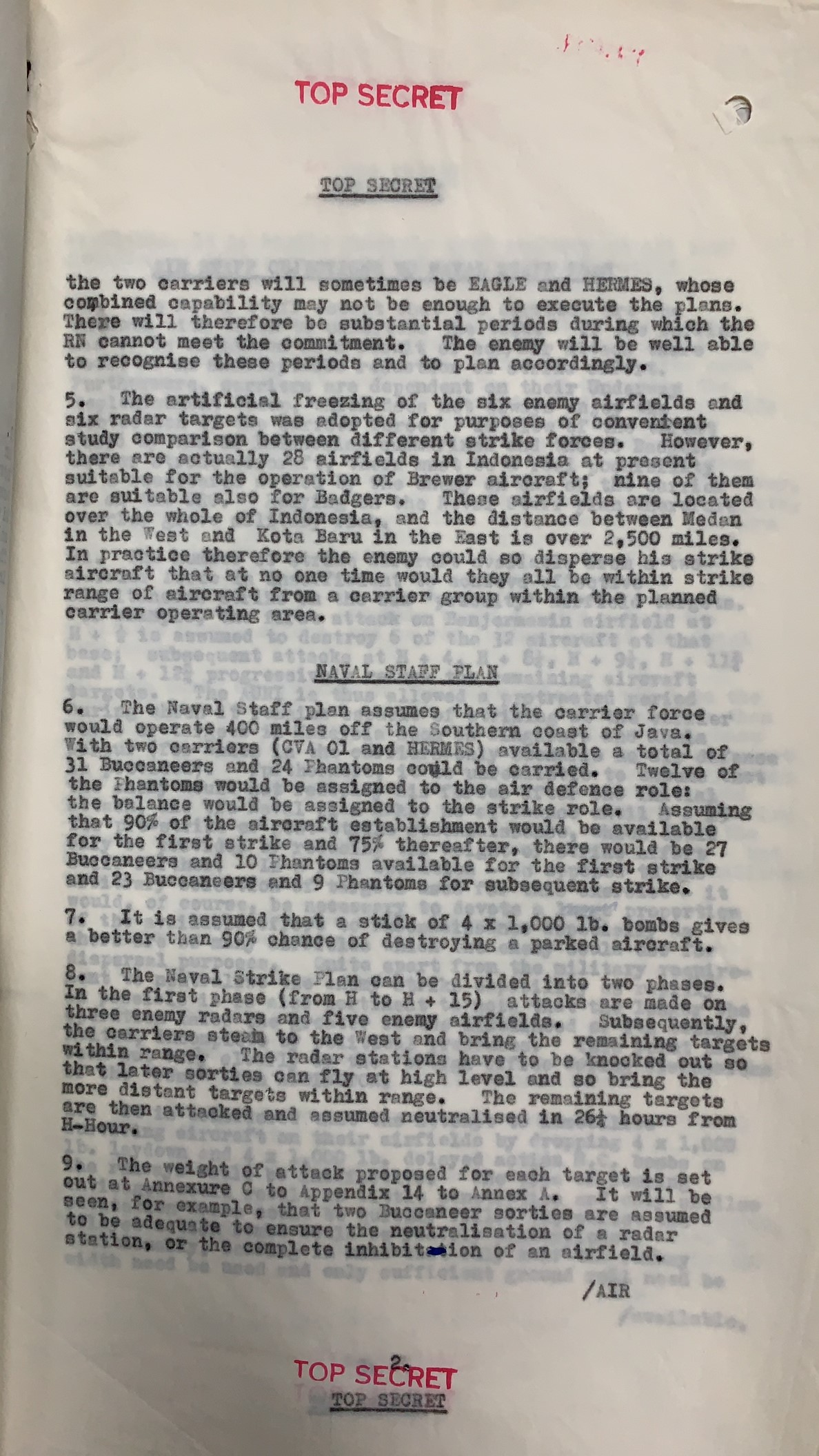
Second page of the now-declassified RAF document "The Validity of a Royal Navy Plan to use Carrier-borne Strike Aircraft to Neutralise Indonesian Air Strike Forces"

The sketch included 30 Buccaneer strike and Sea Vixen fighter aircraft. The variable geometry aircraft under design to Operational Requirement OR.346 was expected to be carried out later.

In an Intervention Study (IWP/65) against Indonesia made in 1965, the Royal Navy assumed two carriers, CVA-01 and HMS Hermes, operating 400 nautical miles off the southern coast of Java, would have 31 Buccaneers (24 for CVA-01 and 7 for Hermes) and 24 Phantoms (12 for CVA-01 and 12 for Hermes) to take on the Indonesian air force of the mid-1970s equipped with 20 Tu-16 Badger bombers and 20 Yak-28 Brewer bombers, deployed at six airfields.

The aircraft complement in the design approved on 27 January 1966 was a mix of 36 British specification McDonnell Douglas Phantom II fleet defence fighters (with secondary strike role) and Blackburn Buccaneer low-level strike aircraft, four early-warning aircraft, five anti-submarine helicopters, and two search-and-rescue helicopters.

Defences included an Ikara anti-submarine system and 2 Sea Dart anti-aircraft missile (then under development) on the quarterdeck; however, 1 Sea Dart and the Ikara were deleted from the design in February 1965 with the remaining Sea Dart to have a magazine of 38 missiles. Seacat was considered as one of the options but in all likelihood would be dropped from the finalised design.

The large 'Broomstick' radar dome above the central island on the carrier was planned to be a Type 988 Anglo-Dutch 3D radar, which would subsequently be fitted on the Royal Netherlands Navy Tromp-class frigates, although this would not have been fitted to the final carrier as Britain pulled out of the project.

The first CVA-01 was to have been laid down in September 1967, launched in September 1969, finish sea trials by December 1971 and achieve full operational status by June 1973.

== Cancellation ==
In mid-1963 the Minister of Defence Peter Thorneycroft announced in Parliament that one new aircraft carrier would be built, at an estimated cost of £60 million, although the Treasury thought that the final cost was likely to be nearer £100 million. This was based on the carrier using the same aircraft as the Royal Air Force, the Hawker Siddeley P.1154 supersonic V/STOL aircraft (a larger version of what would become the Hawker Siddeley Harrier). The single new carrier would be part of a three carrier fleet with a refitted Eagle and Hermes until 1980. After the General Election of October 1964, however, the new Labour Government wanted to cut back defence spending, and the RAF attacked the Royal Navy's carrier in an attempt to safeguard first its BAC TSR-2 strike/reconnaissance aircraft and then its proposed replacement, the General Dynamics F-111, from the cuts.

The new government, and by extension the Treasury, were particularly concerned about the size issues involved, as these were fluctuating quite frequently. They, therefore, demanded that the Admiralty keep to 53,000 tons. With the navy unwilling to alter the size of the carrier and its air group accordingly the difficulties spiralled, and the final tonnage was much more likely to be nearer 55,000 tons. The design issues also increased, including dramatically reduced top speed, deck space, armour, and radar equipment. When the Cabinet met in February 1966, the new Secretary of State for Defence, Denis Healey, strongly supported the RAF and their plan for long-range strike aircraft, by now the F-111, partially due to the cost issues of running fleet carriers, and partially due to opposition to a strong British military. This meeting resulted in the 1966 Defence White Paper. In this paper, the CVA-01 was finally cancelled, along with the remainder of the Type 82 destroyers that would have been built as escorts, of which only HMS Bristol was eventually completed. Instead, plans were made for the modernisation of Eagle and Ark Royal. The final chief designer of CVA-01 said that by the time project was cancelled, so many design compromises had been made because of size and budget restrictions, that the whole project had become risky. The following year, a supplement to the review marked the ending of a global presence with the withdrawal of British presence "East of Suez". The year after, the purchase of F-111s was cancelled.

One argument about the cancellation of CVA-01 states that the RAF moved Australia by 500 miles in its documents to support the air force's preferred strategy of land-based aircraft. Regardless of the story's veracity, the principal reason for the cancellation was that the Defence Review Board believed adequate cover could be better provided East of Suez by RAF strike aircraft flying from bases in Australia and uninhabited islands in the Indian Ocean, rather than by a small carrier fleet in the 1970s which would have still included Hermes. The Review asserted the carrier's only effective use was to project British power East of Suez, and that the RN carriers were too 'vulnerable' for the RN's other major theatre in the North Atlantic. When the British government later decided in 1967 that it would withdraw from east of Suez, the case for carriers weakened further. The 1966 Review stated that the ability of the RAF to cover 300 miles offshore was enough for the 1970s, regardless of the RAF's contested claim of being able to provide air cover out to 700 miles. The cancellation of 150 TSR2 aircraft by Labour in mid-1965 was the basis of the RAF's argument for the 'island hopping strategy'.

David Brown, historian of the Royal Corps of Naval Constructors, described the design perspective of the project as:

"When Louis Rydill took over [in 1962], he was concerned over the extent of novel features, all introduced to keep this big ship within the artificial limit of 50,000 tons. All the features were feasible individually, but it became increasingly unlikely that the cumulative technical problems of them all combined could be resolved by the small Ship Department team or by the already run-down shipbuilding and marine engineering industry. There were still many grey areas of equipment which had not been fully developed. The great ship was dying of constriction before cancellation. The false idea that cost varied directly with displacement ruined many designs of the late 1960s and it was, perhaps, fortunate that the CVA-01 was cancelled before her constraints of size, undue novelty and production problems had led to a costly and unsatisfactory ship."

Louis Rydill described his involvement in the project as "a losing battle against the constraints of a small carrier". He described the cancellation in 1967, after five years on the project lead as: "Cancellation was the happiest day of my life".

== Subsequent Royal Navy carriers ==
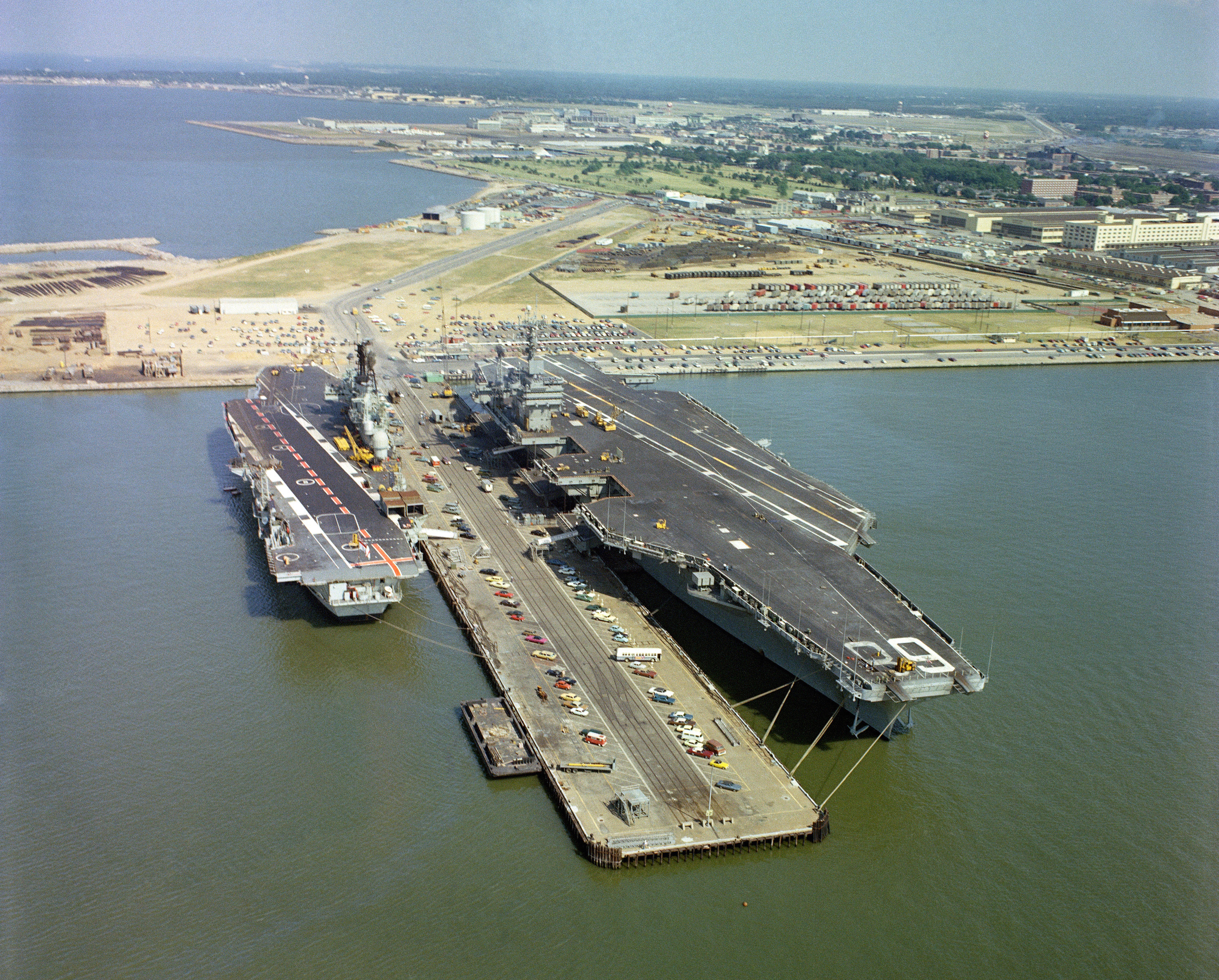
Ark Royal (left) alongside the US Navy carrier Nimitz in 1978

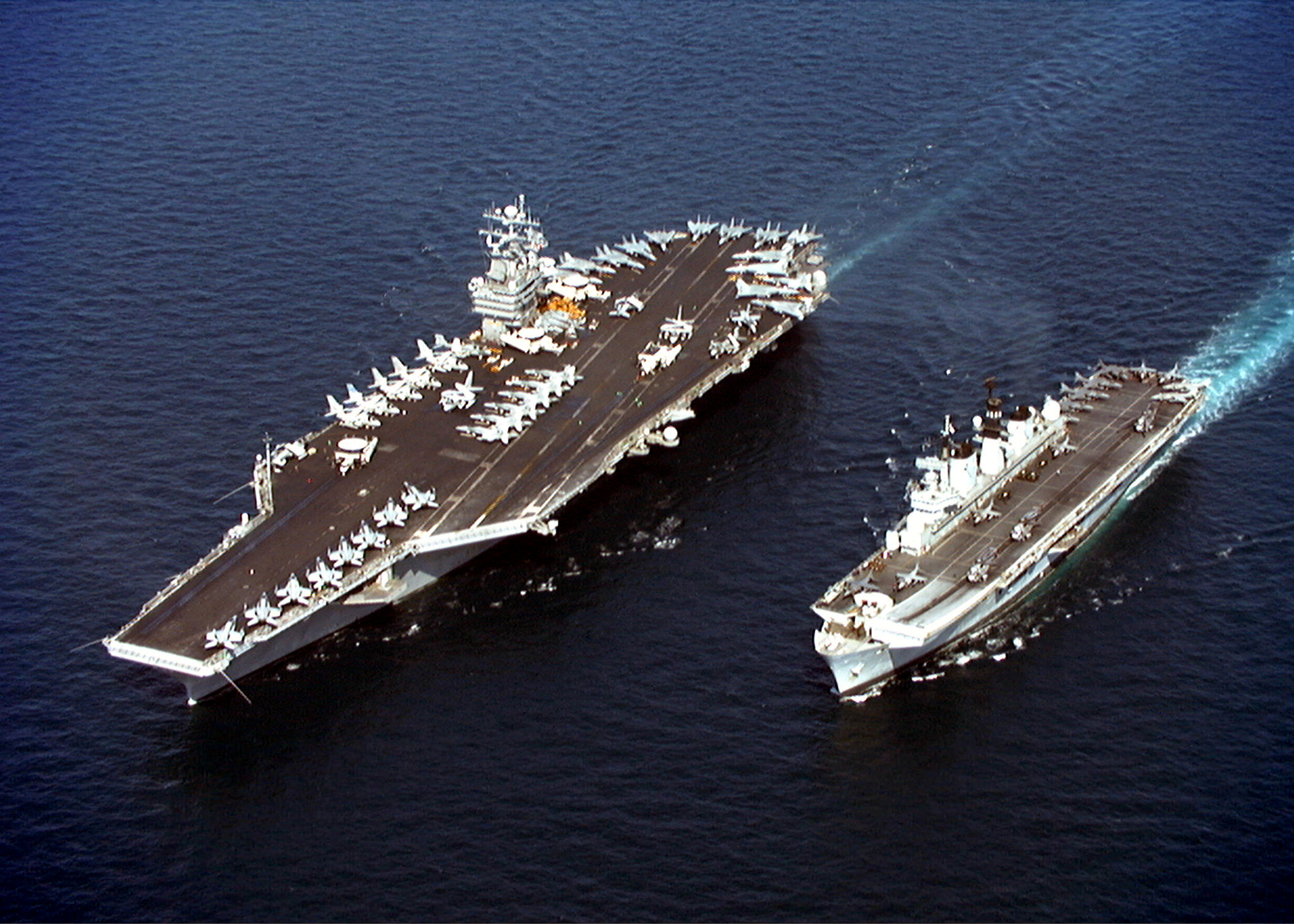
The Invincible-class carrier Illustrious operating alongside USS John C. Stennis in 1998

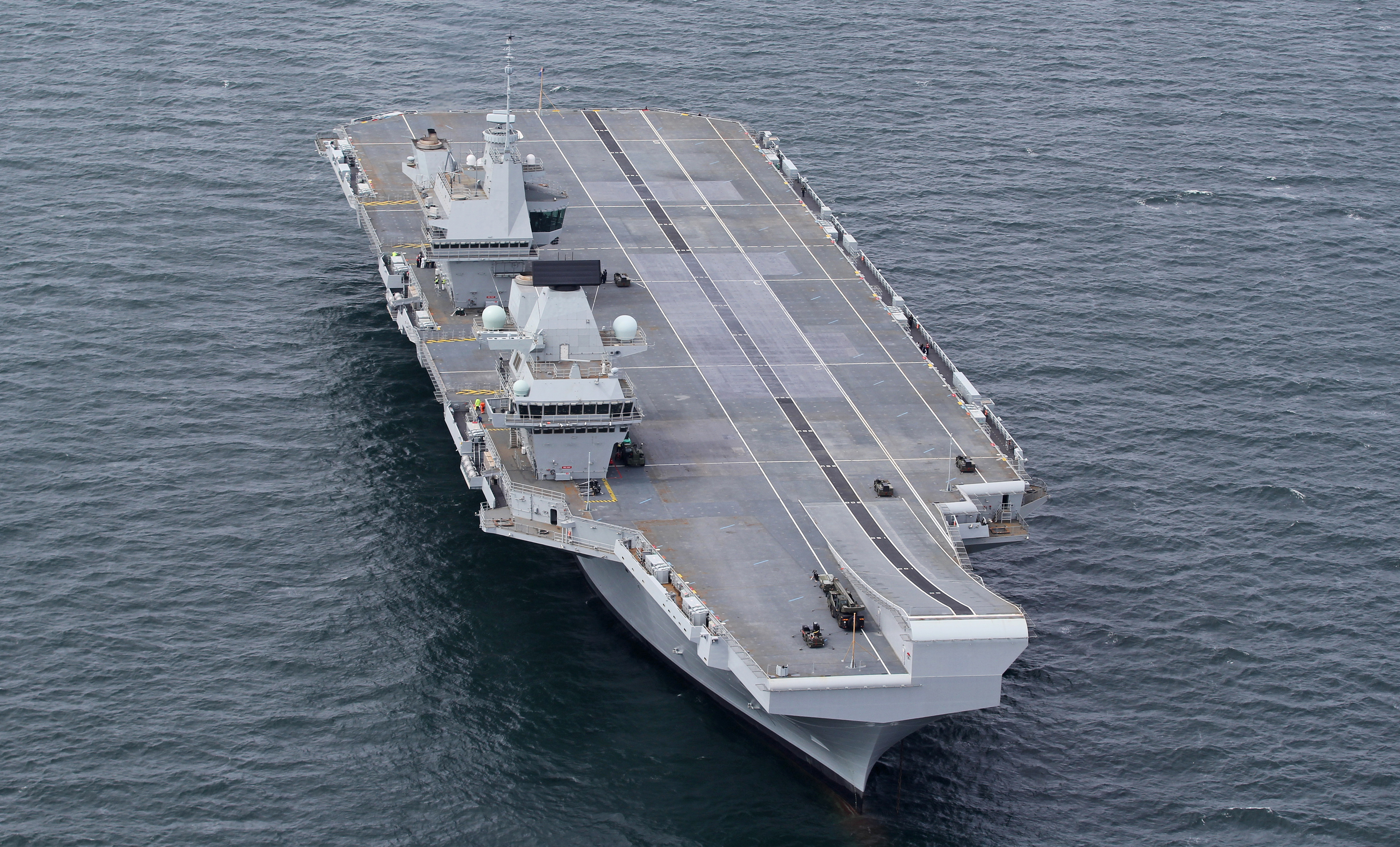
HMS Queen Elizabeth operating in the North Sea in 2017

=== Eagle and Ark Royal ===
The cancellation of CVA-01 was planned to be compensated for by the minimum updating of both Eagle and Ark Royal to enable them to operate the 52 Phantoms ordered. However, a decision was taken later to completely phase out fixed-wing flying in the Royal Navy by 1972 in line with withdrawal from "East of Suez". Victorious was withdrawn in 1969 and Hermes was converted to a "commando carrier" to replace her sister Albion in 1971–1973.

At the time of the announcement, Ark Royal was beginning a reconstruction with an austere refit of radar systems, communications, partial electrical rewiring, and fittings needed to allow operation of the Phantom (despite the fact that it was a worse base for such a conversion than Eagle), and it was deemed unacceptable either to cancel the much-needed work, or to spend such a large amount of money (approx. £32m) for less than three years continued use. A change of government led, as a consequence, to retain Ark Royal following her 1967–1970 refit, but not to proceed with a refit of Eagle. Eagle was decommissioned in 1972, partly due to damage inflicted in a partial grounding a year before; repairs would have probably required a minimum 18-month refit in 1972–1973 at a cost of around £40 million to operate till 1977. Many of the second squadron of F-4 Phantoms intended for Eagle were immediately transferred to the RAF. Eagle remained officially in reserve as a source of spares to maintain Ark Royal until 1978, but could never have been brought back into service.

=== "Through Deck Cruiser" ===
The Royal Navy did not however completely surrender aircraft carrier capability, despite the eventual withdrawal of Ark Royal in 1978. The concept of the "through-deck command cruiser" was first raised in the late 1960s when it became clear that there was a good chance of the Fleet Air Arm losing fixed-wing capability. The "through-deck cruiser" name was chosen to avoid the stigma of great expense attached to full-size aircraft carriers, with these 20,000-ton ships having significantly less fixed-wing aviation capability than the planned CVA-01 carriers. However, they were to function as part of combined NATO fleets, with a primary mission of providing Cold War anti-submarine helicopter patrols in the north-east Atlantic Ocean, in support of the American carrier battle groups of NATO's "Forward Maritime Strategy". Three Invincible-class aircraft carriers were built.

In order to ensure the safety of the battle group around the "cruiser", the facility to carry the Sea Harrier was added at a late stage of development, the intention being that it could give the battle group the capability to intercept Soviet reconnaissance aircraft without having to rely either on land-based or US Navy interceptors. The ultimate result of this was the Royal Navy being able to deploy carrier-based aircraft during the Falklands War. One officer who worked on the CVA-01 believed, however, that had the United Kingdom "built two or three ships to this design, they would now [in 1999] be seen to have been the bargain of the century and they would have made the Falklands War a much less risky operation" due to greater functionality.

=== CVF ===
The United Kingdom returned to the fleet carrier idea with the construction of the Queen Elizabeth-class aircraft carriers, which are larger than the cancelled CVA-01s. The two new carriers, initially dubbed CVF (F for 'Future'), are named HMS Queen Elizabeth and HMS Prince of Wales. The contract for these vessels was announced on 25 July 2007 by the Secretary of State for Defence, Des Browne. Following Queen Elizabeth's commissioning on 7 December 2017, Prince of Wales was commissioned on 10 December 2019.

== Bibliography ==
- Brown, D. K. & Moore, George (2003). Rebuilding the Royal Navy: Warship Design since 1945. Annapolis, Maryland: Naval Institute Press. ISBN 1-59114-705-0.
- Royal United Services Institute Journal – Aug 2006, Vol. 151, No. 4 By Simon Elliott – CVA-01 and CVF – What Lessons Can the Royal Navy Learn from the Cancelled 1960s Aircraft Carrier for its New Flat-top?
- Friedman, Norman (1988). British Carrier Aviation: The Evolution of the Ships and Their Aircraft. Annapolis, Maryland: Naval Institute Press. ISBN 0-87021-054-8.
- Gorst, Anthony (2004). "CVA-01". In Harding, Richard (ed.). The Royal Navy 1930–2000: Innovation and Defence. Naval Policy and History. Vol. 30. Abingdon, UK: Cass. pp. 170–92. ISBN 0-7146-8581-X.
- Hobbs, David (2013). British Aircraft Carriers: Design, Development and Service Histories. Barnsley, UK: Seaforth Publishing. ISBN 978-1-84832-138-0.
- Sturton, Ian (2014). "CVA-01: Portrait of a Missing Link". In Jordan, John (ed.). Warship 2014. London: Conway. pp. 28–48. ISBN 978-1-84486-236-8.
