= Type 965 radar =

Long range aircraft warning radar

Type 965M and Type 965P
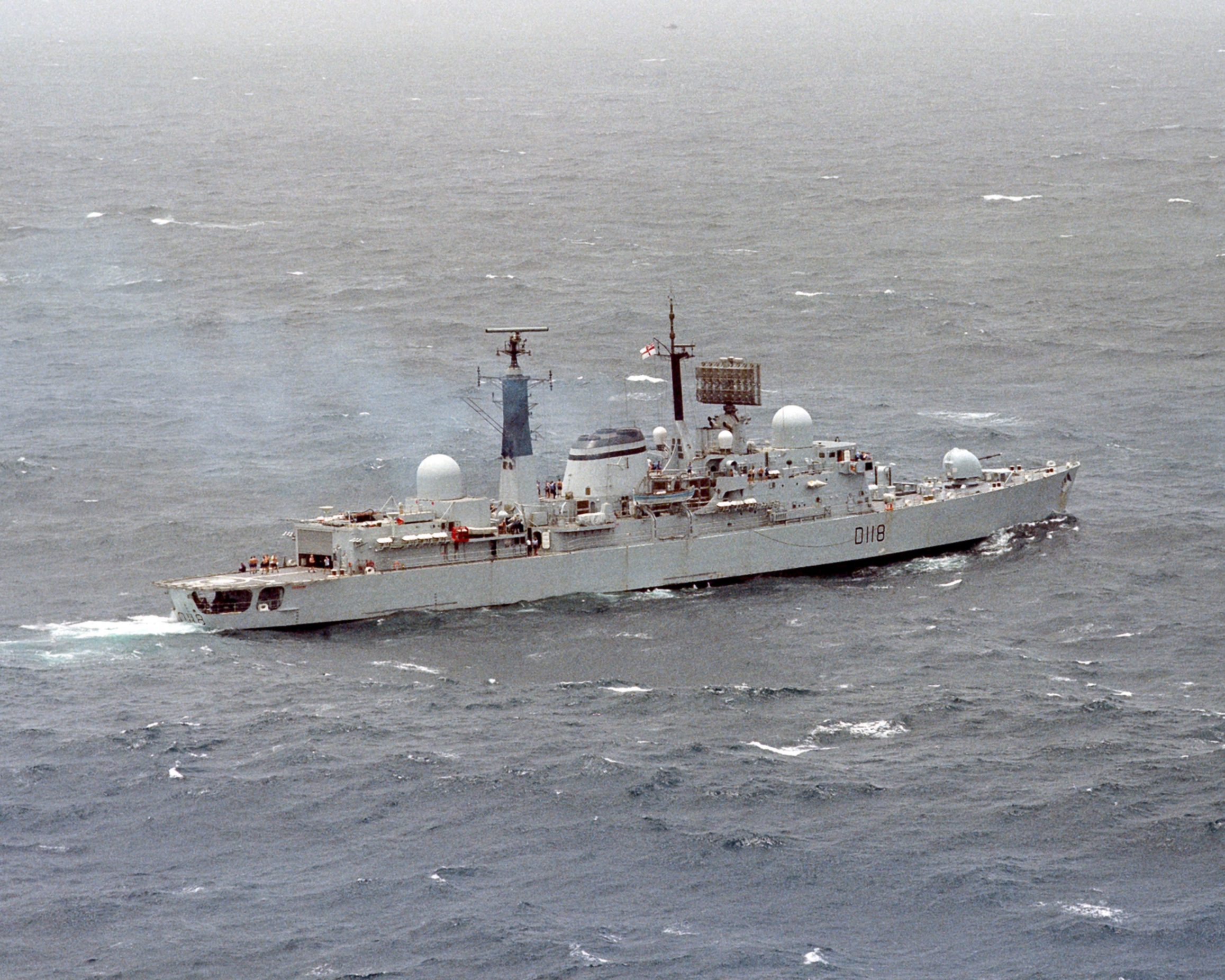
- HMS Coventry in 1981; the AKE(2) aerial of her Type 965R radar is at the top of her foremast
- Country of origin: United Kingdom
- Type: naval long range aircraft warning radar
- Frequency: VHF 216-224 MHz
- PRF: 200 or 400 p/s nominal
- Beamwidth: 12° (horizontal), 40° (vertical)
- Pulsewidth: 3.8 μs and 10 μs
- RPM: 10 rpm
- Power: 450 kW

The Type 965 radar was VHF (P band) long-range aircraft warning radar used by warships of the Royal Navy from the 1960s onwards. The Type 965M, Type 965P, Type 965Q and Type 965R were improved versions; the Type 960, 965M and 965Q used the single bedstead AKE(1) aerial, whilst the Type 965P and 965R used the double bedstead AKE(2) aerial.

The 965 is ultimately designed to a May 1950 requirement for a further updated version of the 1945 Type 960. The 960 provided long-range early warning on small ships, but had a very wide beam at 35° horizontal. In 1954 the idea of a general-purpose frigate with the ability to provide some fighter direction arose, which required a radar with a much narrower beam. Marconi responded with the 965, reducing the beam to 12°. Based on WWII technology, the 965 was subject to considerable radar clutter from waves. The Type 965Q and 965R were improvements on the 965M and 965P respectively, adding a COHO-based moving target indication (MTI) mode to suppress clutter. Designed before the introduction of Doppler filtering, it was not able to detect low-level targets against a background, either landforms or high waves.

The lack of a true MTI proved to be a serious problem during the 1982 Falklands War, which ultimately led to the loss of HMS Coventry where Argentine aircraft could not be seen against the background of the islands. Similarly, the Type 965 could not detect aircraft flying low; the two Argentine Navy Super Étendards that caused the loss of HMS Sheffield were not detected by Type 965R radar when they were flying at 98 feet (30 m), but were shown as contacts by HMS Glasgow's Type 965R radar when they popped up to 120 feet (37 m) above sea-level at 45 nautical miles (83 km), though it was the UAA1 radar warning receiver that drew attention to the contacts. (Note: Woodward's book One Hundred Days (page 10) says that the initial detection was on the "UAA 1 console". Hampshire's book British Guided Missile Destroyers (page 13) explains that Type 42 destroyers were equipped with "UAA1 (Abbey Hill)" from 1978, and says that this is a type of electronic warfare equipment it calls "intercepts", which "detect and identify the radars of approaching aircraft, ships and missiles.")

The Type 965 radars used radio frequencies that were used by television stations, and therefore caused interference with television (and vice versa) if used near land in Europe. Type 965 was superseded by the Type 1022 radar, which did not have this disadvantage.

== Adoption ==
During 1954-55, reports on most fleet exercises showed that there was an urgent need for radar picket ships. These would require a suitable radar. The need for such a radar had been raised as a staff requirement in May 1950. In 1955, four radars were considered:

- The American AN/SPS-6C radar, which was credited with a range of 50 nautical miles (93 km) at 15,000 feet (4,600 m), and 90 nautical miles (170 km) at 60,000 feet (18,000 m).
- The Dutch LW-02 radar, which was credited with a range of 75 nautical miles (139 km) at 35,000 feet (11,000 m).
- A Marconi's Wireless Telegraph Company commercial design originally conceived for land-based air defence, which was credited with a range of 70 nautical miles (130 km) at 35,000 feet (11,000 m).
- Extending the range of the Type 992 radar, by slowing its scanning rate.

A potential route for the Royal Navy to get the SPS-6C was the Mutual Defense Assistance program (MDAP), but by 1954-5 the programme was running down. In addition, it was thought that getting spares for the SPS-6C radar could be a problem, because the United States Navy considered it obsolescent. The Marconi design was chosen and was named Type 965. The Type 965M was introduced in about 1960, and used the original AKE(1) aerial with an improved receiver and feeder.

== Ships with Type 965 radars ==
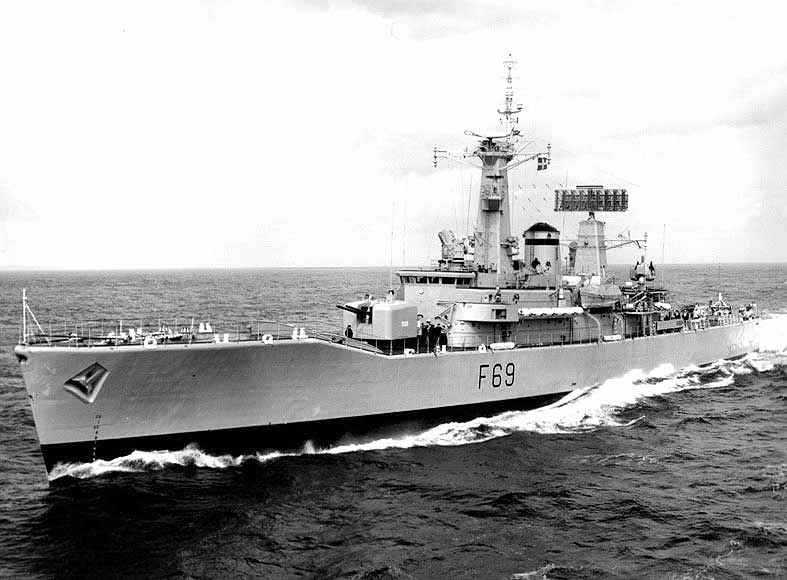
HMS Bacchante in June 1973, with the Type 965M radar's single bedstead AKE(1) aerial on her mainmast.

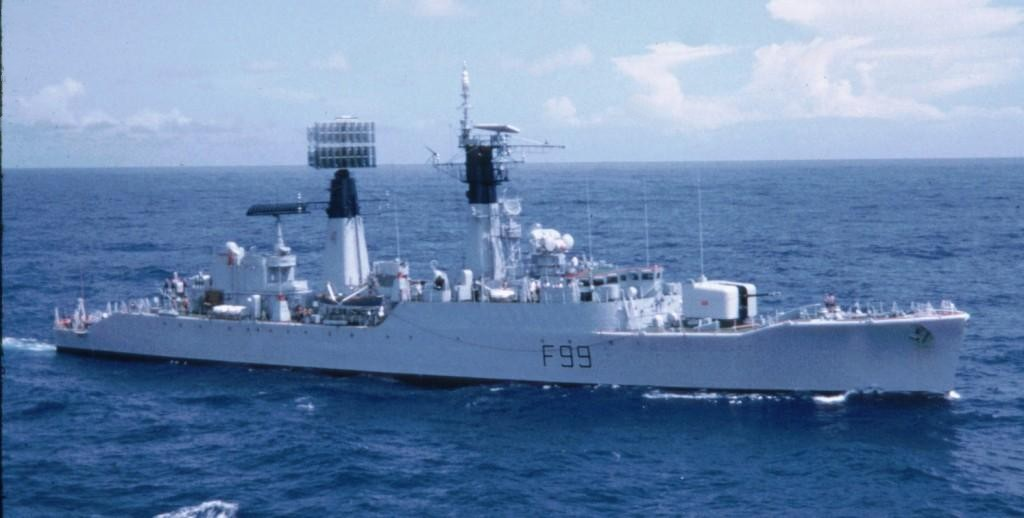
HMS Lincoln in 1972, with the Type 965P radar's double bedstead AKE(2) aerial on her mainmast.

- Type 965M with AKE(1) aerial
  - The aircraft carrier HMS Ark Royal was given a Type 965M system on her foremast when modernised in 1958-59.
  - Type 41 Leopard-class frigates when modernised.
  - Type 81 Tribal-class frigates.
  - Type 12I Leander-class frigates (though removed in the eight ships given the Ikara conversion in 1970-78 and the five ships given the Seawolf missile conversion in 1978-84).
  - Weapon-class destroyers modernised to air direction destroyers.
  - County-class destroyers Batch 1.
  - The aircraft carrier HMS Centaur when refitted in 1963. The radar was taken from the air direction destroyer Battleaxe.
  - Tiger-class cruisers when modernised in the late 1960s.
  - The carrier HMS Hermes when converted from the aircraft carrier role to the commando carrier role in 1971-73.
- Type 965P with AKE(2) aerial
  - Battle-class destroyers - the four that were modernised to air direction destroyers.
  - Type 61 Salisbury-class frigates when modernised in 1961-68. HMS Chichester had her Type 965 removed in 1973 when she was refitted as Hong Kong guardship.
  - County-class destroyer Batch 2.
  - The aircraft carrier HMS Eagle was given a Type 965Q on her lattice foremast when modernised in 1959-64.
  - Type 82 destroyer, the sole ship HMS Bristol described as "Type 965 with double AKE array and IFF". before it was replaced by Type 1022 radar when she was modernised in 1984-6.
- Type 965Q with AKE(1) aerial
- Type 965R with AKE(2) aerial
  - The aircraft carrier HMS Ark Royal was given two Type 965R systems on separate masts when modernised in 1967-70.
  - Type 42 destroyer Batch 1; Batch 2 had the Type 1022.

== Technical specifications ==
A common aerial was used for transmitting and receiving. This was the single bedstead AKE(1) in the Type 965M, and the double bedstead AKE(2) in the Type 965P. The 965M and 965P were integrated with IFF Mk 10. The radar displayed both to an "office display unit" (monitor unit design 44), and up to six remote plan position indicator (PPI) displays.

Type 965M and 965P specifications
	Type 965M and 965P	Type 965Q and 965R
Frequency	216-224 MHz	
Wavelength	approximately 1.4 m (4 ft 7 in)	
Power output	450 kW	
Pulse repetition frequency (PRF)	200 or 400 pulses per second (p/s) nominal	See below
Pulse width	3.8 μs (with 400 p/s PRF); 10 μs (with 200 p/s PRF)	4 μs (nominal for MTI working); 10 μs (for non-MTI working)
Aerial rotation speed	10 revolutions per minute	
Intermediate frequency	13.5 MHz	
Aerial beam width	12° (horizontal), 40° (vertical)	
Receiver bandwidth	long pulse 120 kHz, short pulse 330 kHz	long pulse 120 kHz, short pulse (MTI) 330 kHz

Differences between Type 960 and 965M

- Type 965 receiver noise factor: 8 dB.
- Type 965M receiver noise factor: 4.5 dB.
- Type 965M feeder was 1 dB better than the Type 960 feeder.

Range

- Type 960: credited during appraisal as 70 nautical miles (130 km) at 35,000 feet (11,000 m).
- Type 960: 120 nautical miles (220 km) against an English Electric Canberra at 20,000 feet (6,100 m).
- Type 965M: 200 nautical miles (370 km) at 45,000 feet (14,000 m).
- Type 965P: 280 nautical miles (520 km) at 100,000 feet (30,000 m).

=== Type 965Q and 965R ===
The receiver of the Type 965Q and 965R used "a coherent oscillator (COHO) to provide the coherence in phase between transmission and reception. The COHO is phase locked to the transmitter pulse." With the Type 965Q and 965R, the pulse repetition frequency (PRF) had a number of different settings.

- In non-MTI mode, the PRF was set by the Pulse Synchronising Outfit RSE.
- In MTI mode, to avoid interference from other radars, there were five available pulse intervals, each with a corresponding stagger time. Pulse intervals were ±3 μs; stagger times were ±2 μs.
  - 2580 μs pulse interval ±516 μs stagger time
  - 2590 μs pulse interval ±518 μs stagger time
  - 2600 μs pulse interval ±520 μs stagger time
  - 2610 μs pulse interval ±522 μs stagger time
  - 2620 μs pulse interval ±524 μs stagger time

== Publications ==
- Dyson, Tony (1984). HMS Hermes 1959-1984. Maritime Books. ISBN 0-907771-16-5.
- Friedman, Norman (2008). British Destroyers & Frigates, the Second World War and After (2 ed.). Seaforth Publishing. ISBN 978-1848320154.
- Friedman, Norman (2012). British Cruisers, Two World Wars and After. Seaforth Publishing. ISBN 978-1848320789.
- Friedman, Norman (2005). Harding, Richard (ed.). The Royal Navy, 1930-2000: Innovation and Defence. Frank Cass. ISBN 9780714657103.
- Hampshire, Edward (2016), British Guided Missile Destroyers: County-class, Type 82, Type 42 and Type 45, New Vanguard, Bloomsbury Publishing, ISBN 9781472811172
- Jenkins, SR (14 January 2014), "Radar sets of the County Class", www.littlewars.org.uk
- Marriott, Leo (1990), Royal Navy Frigates Since 1945 (2 ed.), Ian Allan Ltd, ISBN 0-7110-1915-0
- Marriott, Leo (1989), Royal Navy Destroyers Since 1945, Ian Allan, ISBN 0-7110-1817-0
- Marriott, Leo (1985), Royal Navy Aircraft Carriers 1945-1990, ISBN 0-7110-1561-9
- Middlebrook, Martin (2012). The Falklands War (4 ed.). Pen & Sword Military. ISBN 978-1848846364.
- Rivas, Santiago (2012). Wings of the Malvinas: The Argentine Air War Over the Falklands (reprint ed.). Hikoki Publications. ISBN 978-1902109220.
- Woodward, Sandy; Robinson, Patrick (1992). One Hundred Days: The Memoirs of the Falklands Battle Group Commander. Naval Institute Press. ISBN 1-55750-651-5.
- Blackman, Raymond V B, ed. (1966). Jane's Fighting Ships 1966-67. Sampson Low, Marston & Co.
- Moore, John E, ed. (1975). Jane's Fighting Ships 1975-76. Macdonald and Jane's. ISBN 0-354-00519-7.
- Moore, John, ed. (1982). Jane's Fighting Ships 1982-83. Jane's Publishing Company. ISBN 0-7106-0742-3.
- "Type 960 Summary of Data, BR 333(1)" (PDF), www.rnmuseumradarandcommunications2006.org.uk
- "Type 965M/P Summary of Data, BR 333(1)" (PDF), marconiradarhistory.pbworks.com
- "Type 965M/P Summary of Data, BR 333(1)" (PDF), www.rnmuseumradarandcommunications2006.org.uk
- "Type 965Q/R Summary of Data, BR 333(1)" (PDF), www.rnmuseumradarandcommunications2006.org.uk
