= Centaur-class aircraft carrier =

Royal Navy aircraft carrier class

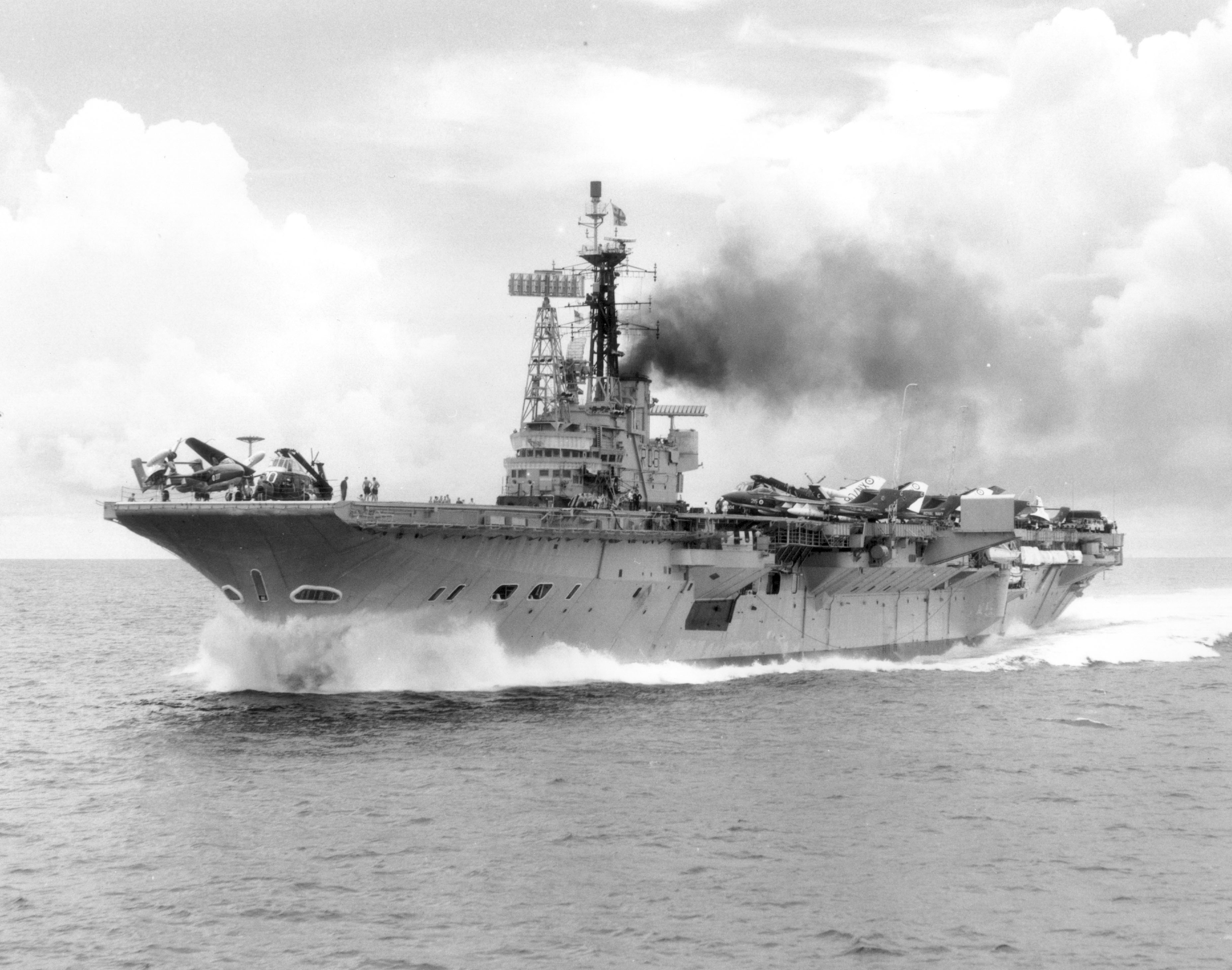
- HMS Centaur in 1965

Class overview
- Name: Centaur class
- Builders: Harland & Wolff; Swan Hunter; Vickers Armstrong
- Operators: Royal Navy; Indian Navy
- Preceded by: 1942 Design Light Fleet Carrier
- Succeeded by: Invincible class
- Subclasses: Hermes (completed to a modified design)
- Built: 1944-1959
- In commission: 1953-1983 (Royal Navy); 1987-2017 (Indian Navy)
- Planned: 8
- Completed: 4
- Canceled: 4
- Retired: 4

General characteristics 1947 design
- Type: Light aircraft carrier
- Displacement: 22,471 tons (standard); 27,015 tons (deep)
- Length: 736 ft (224.3 m)
- Beam: 120.6 ft (36.8 m)
- Draught: 27.2 ft (8.3 m)
- Installed power: 76,000 hp (57,000 kW)
- Propulsion: 2 shaft geared steam turbines, 4 Admiralty 3-drum boilers
- Speed: 28.5 knots (52.8 km/h; 32.8 mph)
- Range: 6,000 nautical miles (11,000 km; 6,900 mi) at 20 kn
- Complement: 227 officers, 1596 ratings
- Sensors & processing systems: 1 x Type 980 air warning radar; 1 x Type 293 gunnery air search radar; 4 x Type 277Q air control radar
- Armament: 32 40 mm Bofors guns (2 × 6), (8 × 2), (4 × 1)
- Armour: 1 in (25 mm) flight deck
- Aircraft carried: 50
- Aviation facilities: 2 x BH V hydraulic catapults; Mk 11 arrestor gear

The Centaur class aircraft carrier was the final iteration of the 1942 Design Light Fleet Carrier developed by the United Kingdom for the Royal Navy during the Second World War. They were designed in 1943 to operate higher-performance aircraft than the preceding Majestic-class aircraft carrier. Four ships were laid down in 1944–1945 and completed in 1953–1959. Rapid developments in carrier warfare and technology overtook the ships even as they were under construction, and the associated costs of modernisation led to ships being completed to different specifications. Only the last ship, HMS Hermes (R12), was fitted as a modern fixed-wing carrier; she was also the last of the class to retire in 2017 as INS Viraat.

== Development ==
Britain hoped to order eight light fleet carriers in 1943 to supplement the Malta-class aircraft carrier. Matters were complicated by the demand to operate larger and higher performing aircraft; at the end of 1942, the Joint Technical Committee recommended that carriers be able to operate 30,000 pounds (14,000 kg) aircraft with a landing speed of 75 knots (139 km/h). A new light carrier design was required as the Majestic-class aircraft carrier could not be modified to handle the new requirements; it became the first British carrier design to be dominated by aircraft operations. A sketch design was prepared by the end of May 1943, and the final design was approved in March 1944; it was revised in 1947.

Eight of the new light carriers were ordered in 1943. It quickly became apparent that wartime demands on shipyard capacity made it impossible to complete the ships in 1946. Only three - Albion, Centaur, Elephant - started construction in 1944; Bulwark started in 1945; the remainder were cancelled on 15 October 1945 with Elephant being renamed Hermes after one of the cancelled ships. The remainder were completed in the 1950s

The cost of modernisation saw the ships diverge in capability even before completion. Albion and Bulwark were completed with interim angled flight decks and hydraulic catapults. They were not modernised to operate modern aircraft, instead being converted into helicopter assault ships ("commando carriers"). Centaur was partially modernised with steam catapults shortly after being commissioned and limited to operating mainly de Havilland Sea Vixen fighters until retirement in 1965. Hermes was the last ship completed - in 1959 - and the only one to be fully modernised. Her career as a conventional carrier ended in 1970 while operating Sea Vixens and Blackburn Buccaneers; afterwards, she served as a helicopter carrier and then as a V/STOL carrier operating Sea Harrier fighters. Hermes was sold to India as INS Viraat, and continued to operate Sea Harriers from 1987 until retiring in 2017.

== Design ==
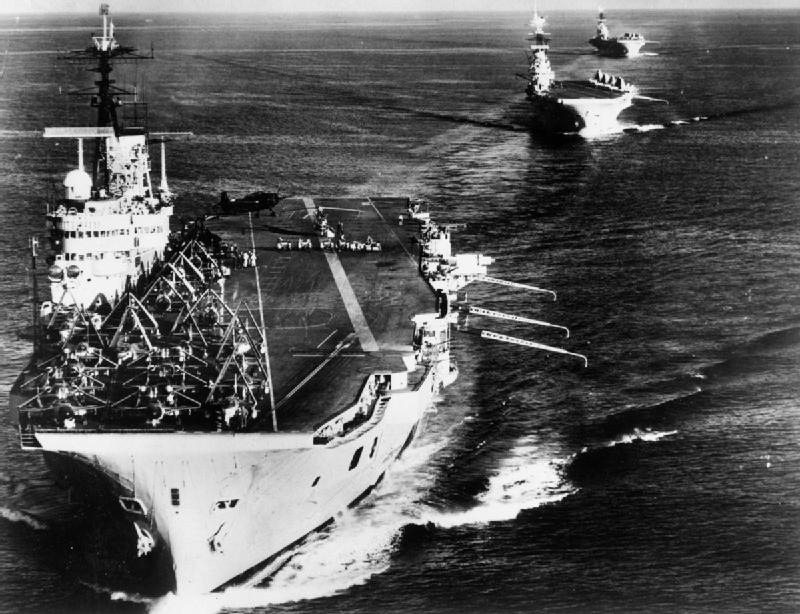
HMS Eagle, HMS Bulwark and HMS Albion during the Suez Crisis.

The 1942 light fleet carrier was conceived as a wartime expedient to respond to the Royal Navy's desperate need for fast carriers. The design was ruthlessly simplified to reduce cost and construction times; the hull was unarmoured and built to merchant standards, armament was limited to light anti-aircraft guns, and it used existing cruiser machinery. During requirements discussions, it was suggested that durability was needed for just three years of service.

From the initial 1943 sketches, the Centaur was designed for longer post-war careers to a hybrid of merchant and warship standards. The flight deck, longitudinal protective bulkhead, middle deck over the machinery, and lower decks over aviation fuel were constructed with hardened steel. The magazines and bomb rooms were covered by 2-inch non-cemented armour. The remainder of the hull was made of mild steel. The hull was enlarged to accommodate larger aircraft; the 1-inch hardened steel construction of the flight deck also supported heavier aircraft. The axial flight deck included one catapult. The machinery was half the set used on the Audacious-class aircraft carrier for 76,000 shaft horsepower on two shafts; there was no capacity to develop new machinery. Armament neared fleet carrier standards with 4 twin 4.5-inch BD guns.

The design was modified in 1947. Living arrangements were upgraded to peacetime standards and to include centralised messing; the aft hangar was converted into additional living space. The addition of a second catapult may have also contributed to the hangar length being reduced from 501 feet (153 m) to 381 ft. The 4.5 inch guns were removed. The island was redesigned to add the new two-deck configuration for the action information organisation. The intended radar suite was an air warning Type 980, a gunnery air search Type 293, and two pairs of air control Type 277Q; none of these were actually used.

== Ships ==
Name	Pennant number	Builder	Laid down	Launched	Commissioned	Decommissioned	Fate
Centaur	R06	Harland and Wolff, Belfast	30 May 1944	22 April 1947	1 September 1953	27 September 1965	Broken up at Cairnryan
Hermes (ex-Elephant)	R12	Vickers-Armstrongs. Barrow-in-Furness	21 June 1944	16 February 1953	25 November 1959	12 April 1984	Sold to Indian Navy
Bulwark	R08	Harland & Wolff, Belfast	10 May 1945	22 June 1948	4 November 1954	27 March 1981	Broken up at Cairnryan
Albion	R07	Swan Hunter, Wallsend	22 March 1944	16 May 1947	26 May 1954	2 March 1973	Broken up at Faslane

=== Hermes (cancelled) ===
Hermes was the original name-ship of the class. She was ordered from Cammell Laird of Birkenhead on 12 July 1943. No work had been done when construction was ordered to be deferred in early 1944. The ship was cancelled on 15 October 1945. The name was transferred to Elephant.

=== Centaur ===
Centaur was the first ship completed and the only one completed to the original design. She was ordered from Harland & Wolff on 12 July 1943 and laid down on 30 May 1944. Construction was halted for two years. The ship was completed on 1 September 1953 and commissioned on 17 September. An interim 5.5-degree angled deck was fitted at Portsmouth Dockyard from October 1953 to May 1954. Centaur underwent a limited modernisation refit from September 1956 to September 1958 during which the hydraulic catapults were replaced by BS-4 steam catapults; features required to operate modern strike aircraft, like a fully angled flight deck, were not fitted due to yard capacity issues. Afterwards, she was limited to mainly Sea Vixen fighters and Fairey Gannet anti-submarine warfare (ASW) aircraft.

Centaur operated as an aircraft carrier and a helicopter assault ship during the suppression of the Tanganyika Rifles in 1964. She decommissioned for the last time on 27 September 1965 and became an accommodation ship for the remainder of her life. Plans to convert the ship into a helicopter carrier were cancelled in 1966. The hulk was sold for scrapping on 11 August 1972.

=== Albion ===
Albion was ordered from Swan Hunter on 12 July 1943 and laid down at Wallsend-on-Tyne on 23 March 1944. Work slowed after 1945. The hull was launched on 6 May 1947 and then laid-up with machinery installed; construction resumed after August 1949. She was commissioned on 26 May 1954 as the first carrier ever to be completed with both an angled flight deck - an interim 5.5-degree one - and mirror landing aids. She participated in Operation Musketeer during the Suez Crisis in 1956.

Albion was to have been modernised with steam catapults after Centaur, but this was cancelled after the 1957 defence policy review. Instead, she became the second ship of the class - after Bulwark - to be converted into a helicopter assault ship; the refit was done at Portsmouth Dockyard from February 1961 to July 1962. Albion could carry 900 troops, a greater number than her sister's due to a more extensive conversion; Bulwark was later refitted to a similar standard. Another defence review in 1973 led to Albion being discarded - rather than being refitted - to pay for HMS Invincible (R05). She was decommissioned for the last time on 2 March 1973, to be replaced by HMS Hermes (R12) when the latter's conversion to a helicopter assault ship was completed in August 1973. Albion was sold on 22 October 1973 to be converted into a heavy-lift crane to support the North Sea oil industry; the scheme fell through and the hull was sold for scrapping a few weeks later.

=== Bulwark ===
Bulwark was ordered from Harland & Wolff on 12 July 1943, but deferred in early 1944. She was laid down on 10 May 1945, becoming the fourth ship of the class instead of Monmouth which Fairfield had been unable to start construction of in 1944. Work slowed after the war. The carrier was commissioned on 29 October 1954, and was completed with an interim 5.5-degree angled flight deck on 4 November. Bulwark served as a trials and training carrier in 1955 and 1956, replacing HMS Illustrious (87) which was laid up in December 1954 and sold for scrapping in November 1956. The carrier returned to operational status in August 1956 and participated in Operation Musketeer during the Suez Crisis in November.

The 1957 defence policy review led to Bulwark being converted into a helicopter assault ship rather than being modernised for fixed-wing aircraft. The initial conversion was done at Portsmouth Dockyard from January 1959 to January 1960, with another refit occurring in 1963 to match the more extensive conversion of Albion. In June 1968, she demonstrated - for the first time - the reinforcement of Norway by assault carriers during NATO Exercise Polar Express.

The carrier was reduced to reserve in April 1976. In 1978, HMS Ark Royal (R09) was retired before the Invincible-class aircraft carriers entered service; Bulwark was refitted in 1977-1979 and returned to service on 23 February 1979 to fill the gap. The ship suffered a boiler room fire in March 1980; the damage was not fully repaired and her maximum speed was decreased. Another major fire, coupled with the ship's poor material state, led to her retirement six months earlier than planned; she decommissioned for the last time on 27 March 1981. The hull was used for demolitions training by the Royal Marines. A proposal to convert the hull into an aircraft maintenance carrier for the Falklands War was rejected due to her poor condition and insufficient equipment. Bulwark was sold for scrapping in 1984.

=== Hermes (ex-Elephant) ===
Elephant was ordered from Vickers-Armstrongs on 12 July 1943 and laid down at Barrow-in-Furness on 21 June 1944. She was renamed as Hermes on 5 November 1945 following the cancellation of the name-ship of the class. Construction was protracted due to work on the higher-priority HMAS Melbourne (R21) and major design revisions. The ship was launched in 1953 only to undergo full modernisation that required partial disassembly and reconstruction; steam catapults, a full 8-degree angled flight deck, a side lift instead of a forward centreline lift, the Comprehensive Display System (CDS), and the Type 984 radar were installed. Hermes completed builder's trials on 18 November 1959 and was commissioned on 25 November.

Hermes was converted into a helicopter assault ship at Portsmouth Dockyard from 1 March 1971 to 14 August 1973; the steam catapults, arrestor gear, CDS, and the Type 984 were removed. She was refitted as an ASW carrier in 1977. The carrier trialled the Sea Harrier in 1977–1978. From May 1980 to 9 May 1981 she was refitted at Portsmouth into a general-purpose carrier operating Sea Harriers, and ASW and air assault helicopters; a 12-degree ski-jump and Ferranti 1600E computer were installed. She was the flagship of the British task force during the Falklands War in 1982.

Hermes paid off for the last time on 22 November 1983 and sold to India after the completion of HMS Ark Royal (R07). She was refitted at Devonport Dockyard for a year and then commissioned into the Indian Navy as INS Viraat on 12 May 1987. Viraat decommissioned on 6 March 2017, and scrapped starting in 2020.

=== Arrogant ===
Arrogant was ordered from Swan Hunter on 12 July 1943, deferred in early 1944, and then cancelled on 15 October 1945. No work appears to have been done. She was to be built at Wallsend-on-Tyne.

=== Monmouth ===
Monmouth was ordered from the Fairfield Shipbuilding & Engineering Company on 12 July 1943. She was to have been one of the four ships to start construction in 1944, but Fairfield was too overloaded to do so; Bulwark replaced Monmouth as the fourth ship in 1945. Monmouth was cancelled on 15 October 1945 with no work apparently having been done.

=== Polyphemus ===
Polyphemus was ordered from Devonport Dockyard on 11 August 1943, to be constructed after HMS Terrible. Construction was deferred in late 1943 and cancelled on 15 October 1945. Parsons Marine Engineering received orders for machinery before the deferral; the orders were cancelled before the ship was. The slipway would have required a slight extension to build the carrier; Fore Street was purchased to make room and walled off, and was only returned to Plymouth in 2005.

== See also ==
- 1942 Design Light Fleet Carrier
- Light aircraft carrier
- Invincible-class aircraft carrier
- List of aircraft carriers of the Royal Navy

== Sources ==
- Dyson, Tony (1984). HMS Hermes, 1959-1984. Maritime Books. ISBN 978-0907771166.
- Friedman, Norman (1988). British Carrier Aviation: The Evolution of the Ships and Their Aircraft. Annapolis, Maryland: Naval Institute Press. ISBN 0-87021-054-8.
- Hobbs, David (2014). British Aircraft Carriers: Design, Development & Service Histories. Barnsley, England: Seaforth Publishing. ISBN 9781473853515.
