= Invincible-class aircraft carrier =

Royal Navy aircraft carrier class

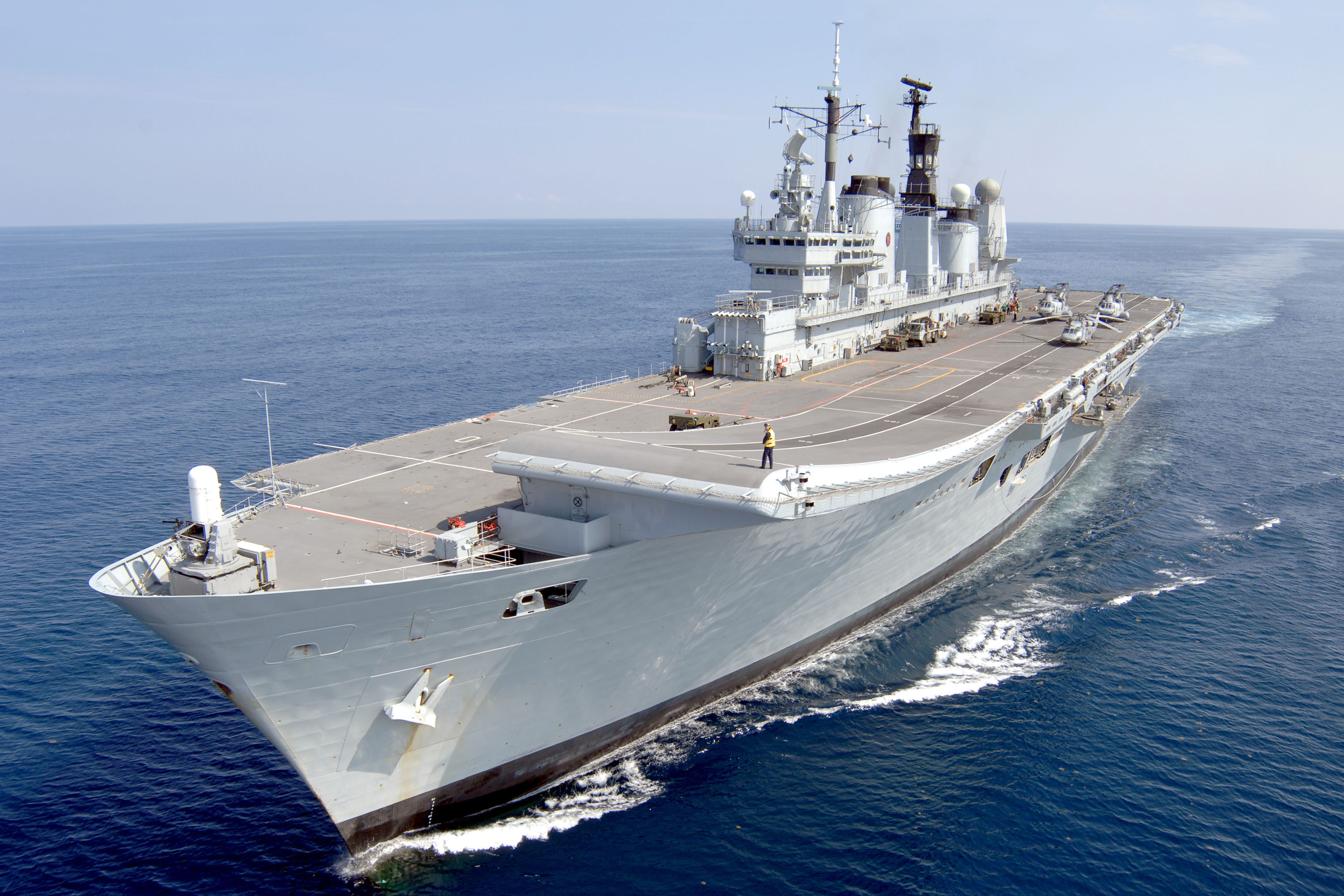
- HMS Ark Royal in 2008

Class overview
- Name: Invincible class
- Builders: Swan Hunter; Vickers Limited Shipbuilding Group
- Operators: Royal Navy
- Preceded by: Audacious-class fleet carrier; Centaur-class light carrier
- Succeeded by: Queen Elizabeth class
- Built: 1973–1981
- In commission: 1980–2014
- Completed: 3
- Scrapped: 3

General characteristics
- Type: Light aircraft carrier
- Displacement: 22,000 tonnes
- Length: 209 m (686 ft)
- Beam: 36 m (118 ft)
- Draught: 8 m (26 ft)
- Propulsion: COGAG; 4 × Rolls-Royce Olympus TM3B gas turbines; 8 × Paxman Valenta diesel generators; 100,000 shp (75 MW); 2 shafts
- Speed: 28 kn (52 km/h; 32 mph) maximum; 18 kn (33 km/h; 21 mph) cruising
- Range: 7,000 nmi (13,000 km; 8,100 mi) at cruising speed
- Troops: Up to 500 Marines
- Complement: 650 ships company, 350 air crew
- Sensors & processing systems: Type 1022 Air Search Radar; Type 996 Surface Search Radar; Type 1006/1007 Navigation Radar; Type 909 Fire Control Radar (until 1998-2000); Type 2016 Sonar
- Armament: Sea Dart missile system (removed during late 1990s); 2 × 20 mm anti-aircraft guns; 3 Phalanx/Goalkeeper close-in weapons systems
- Aircraft carried: Until December 2010, 22 aircraft; Multi Mission - Strike, ASuW and ASW; 12 x Harrier GR.7/9; 10 x Sea King ASaC and Merlin HM Mk.1 helicopters; Multi Mission - Strike and ASuW; 18 x Harrier GR.7/9; 4 x Sea King ASaC and Merlin HM Mk.1 helicopters
- Aviation facilities: 168 m (551 ft) axial flight deck; Bow 12° ski-jump

The Invincible class was a class of light aircraft carrier operated by the Royal Navy. Three ships were constructed: HMS Invincible, HMS Illustrious and HMS Ark Royal. The vessels were built as aviation-capable anti-submarine warfare (ASW) platforms to counter the Cold War North Atlantic Soviet submarine threat, and initially embarked Sea Harrier aircraft and Sea King HAS.1 anti-submarine helicopters. With cancellation of the aircraft carriers renewal programme in the 1960s, the three ships became the replacements for the Audacious-class fleet carriers and the Centaur-class light fleet carriers, and the Royal Navy's sole class of aircraft carrier.

The three vessels saw active service in a number of locations, including the South Atlantic during the Falklands War, the Adriatic during the Bosnian War, and in the Middle East for the 2003 Invasion of Iraq.

Invincible was decommissioned in 2005 and put in reserve in a low state of readiness. She was sold to a Turkish scrapyard in February 2011, and left Portsmouth under tow on 24 March 2011. Pursuant to the Strategic Defence and Security Review, 2010, Ark Royal followed, decommissioning on 13 March 2011. This left Illustrious as the sole remaining ship, serving as a helicopter carrier from 2011 to 2014 when it was decommissioned as well. Although the helicopter carrier HMS Ocean remained in service, the Royal Navy was without a true aircraft carrier for the first time in nearly a century, until the commissioning of the first of two Queen Elizabeth-class aircraft carriers in December 2017.

== Development ==
The Invincible class has its origins in a sketch design for a 6,000-ton, guided-missile armed, helicopter carrying escort cruiser intended as a complement to the much larger CVA-01-class fleet aircraft carrier. The cancellation of CVA-01 in 1966 meant that the smaller cruiser would now have to provide the anti-submarine warfare (ASW) taskforce with command and control facilities. Two new designs were prepared for this requirement; a 12,500-ton cruiser with missiles forward, six Westland Sea King helicopters and a flight deck aft, somewhat similar to Vittorio Veneto of the Italian Navy and a larger 17,500-ton vessel with a "through-deck", nine Sea Kings and missiles right forward. By 1970, the "through-deck" design had advanced into a Naval Staff Requirement for an 18,750-ton Through-Deck Command Cruiser (TDCC).

In February 1963, the Hawker P.1127 VTOL (vertical take-off and landing) aircraft had landed and taken-off from the carrier Ark Royal and the subsequent Hawker-Siddeley Kestrel had undergone trials from the "Commando carrier" (an aircraft carrier operating helicopters) HMS Bulwark. It was therefore perfectly possible that the new "cruisers" could be used to operate VTOL aircraft. The new ships were called "through-deck cruisers" and not "aircraft carrier". This was in part because CVA-01's cancellation was so recent, but also because the ships were intended to serve in traditional cruiser roles of C^{3}I and anti-submarine warfare, and were constructed like cruisers. The "aircraft carrier" name did not officially appear in association with the ships until the 1980 Defence Estimates referred to the Invincibles as such.

Economic problems in the UK in the early 1970s delayed progress on the new ships, but the design continued to evolve. The order for the first ship was given to Vickers (Shipbuilding) on 17 April 1973. By now, the design was for a 19,000-ton "CAH" (helicopter carrying heavy cruiser, styled after the US Navy hull classification symbols) with up to fourteen aircraft and a Sea Dart missile launcher on the bows.

The government decided that the carrier needed fixed-wing aircraft to defend against Soviet reconnaissance aircraft. In May 1975, it authorised the maritime version of the Hawker Siddeley Harrier, which was successfully developed into the Sea Harrier. This meant that the design was reworked again to include a small complement of these VTOL aircraft. The comparatively short 170-metre (560 ft) flight deck made even STOVL rolling take-offs marginal for launching fully laden Harriers. The development of the ski-jump made it possible to launch in all conditions by propelling the aircraft upwards at the end of its take-off roll. Invincible and Illustrious were equipped with 7° ski-jumps, and Ark Royal carried a 12° ski-jump. The class also had, since 1976, a secondary role as a helicopter carrier, or LPH, in the reinforcement of NATO's Northern flank in Norway. In 1998, HMS Ocean, with a hull form based on that of the Invincible class, was commissioned specifically for this role.

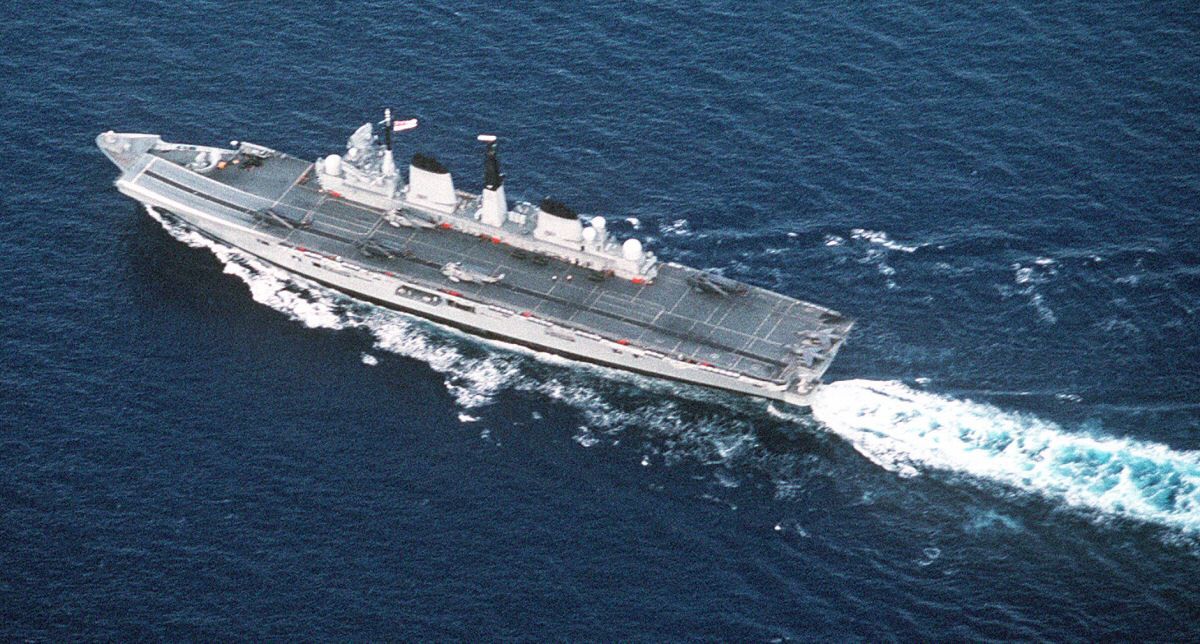
HMS Invincible in 1991

After the 1982 Falklands War, CIWS guns were added to the design. Illustrious had them fitted at the last minute before commissioning, Ark Royal had them added as a normal part of the building process, and Invincible had them fitted during her first overhaul after the Falklands. Initially, Invincible and Illustrious were fitted with two Vulcan Phalanx units; these were replaced with three Goalkeeper systems. Ark Royal retained the three Phalanx CIWS systems she was fitted with when built (she could be easily distinguished from her sisters by the Phalanx's distinctive white "R2-D2" radome). Electronic countermeasures were provided by a Thales jamming system and ECM system. Seagnat launchers were provided for chaff or flare decoys. As part of upgrades during the mid-1990s, all three ships had the Sea Dart removed, with the forecastle filled in to increase the size of the flight deck.

=== Foreign interest ===
In the mid-1970s, the Shah of Iran expressed interest in acquiring three Invincible-class ships and a fleet of twenty-five Sea Harriers to provide fleet defence. When the Iranian Navy could not commit to providing sufficient personnel for manning the vessels, the ship order was cancelled in 1976. A later proposal to buy four "Harrier-type" vessels was also discarded, as were later negotiations to buy the Sea Harrier.

The 1981 Defence White Paper and its planned reduction in the size of the carrier fleet saw Invincible marked as surplus to requirements, and the ship was offered for sale to the Royal Australian Navy in July 1981 as a replacement for the ageing aircraft carrier HMAS Melbourne. The class had previously been considered and discarded as a potential replacement for the Australian ship, but the low £175 million (A$285 million) offer price and the already-constructed state of the vessel prompted the Australian government to announce in February 1982 their intention to accept the British offer. In Australian service, the ship would have been named HMAS Australia, and would operate as a helicopter carrier until a later decision on the acquisition of Sea Harriers was made. Invincible's service during the Falklands War showed that the White Paper's suggested reductions were flawed and both nations withdrew from the deal in July 1982.

== Falklands War ==
Prior to 1982, Invincible's air group consisted purely of Sea King HAS.5 anti-submarine helicopters and Sea Harrier FRS.1 aircraft. Typically, nine Sea Kings, and four or five Sea Harriers were embarked. This was due to the fact that the originally envisioned mission for the ships was to provide the heart of ASW hunter-killer groups in the North Atlantic during a war against the Soviet Union. In that context, the main weapon of the carrier would not be its fighter aircraft, but its ASW helicopters. The fighters were on board to shoot down the occasional Soviet maritime patrol aircraft nosing around the ship and its escorts.

The Falklands War changed that posture, since it proved that Britain needed to retain the capability to use carrier air power in its traditional role of power projection, both over land, and against enemy fleets. The Falklands War saw Invincible, and the larger and older HMS Hermes filled to capacity with both the Sea Harrier and the Royal Air Force Harrier GR3 ground attack variant of the aircraft, along with ASW helicopters. The RAF Harriers proved to be a temporary aberration at the time, but a permanent addition to the usual air group was made due to lessons learned during the war: the Sea King AEW2A (airborne early warning) version. Illustrious carried the first examples of the type when it was rushed south in the aftermath of the Falklands War to relieve Invincible of its guard duty around the islands.

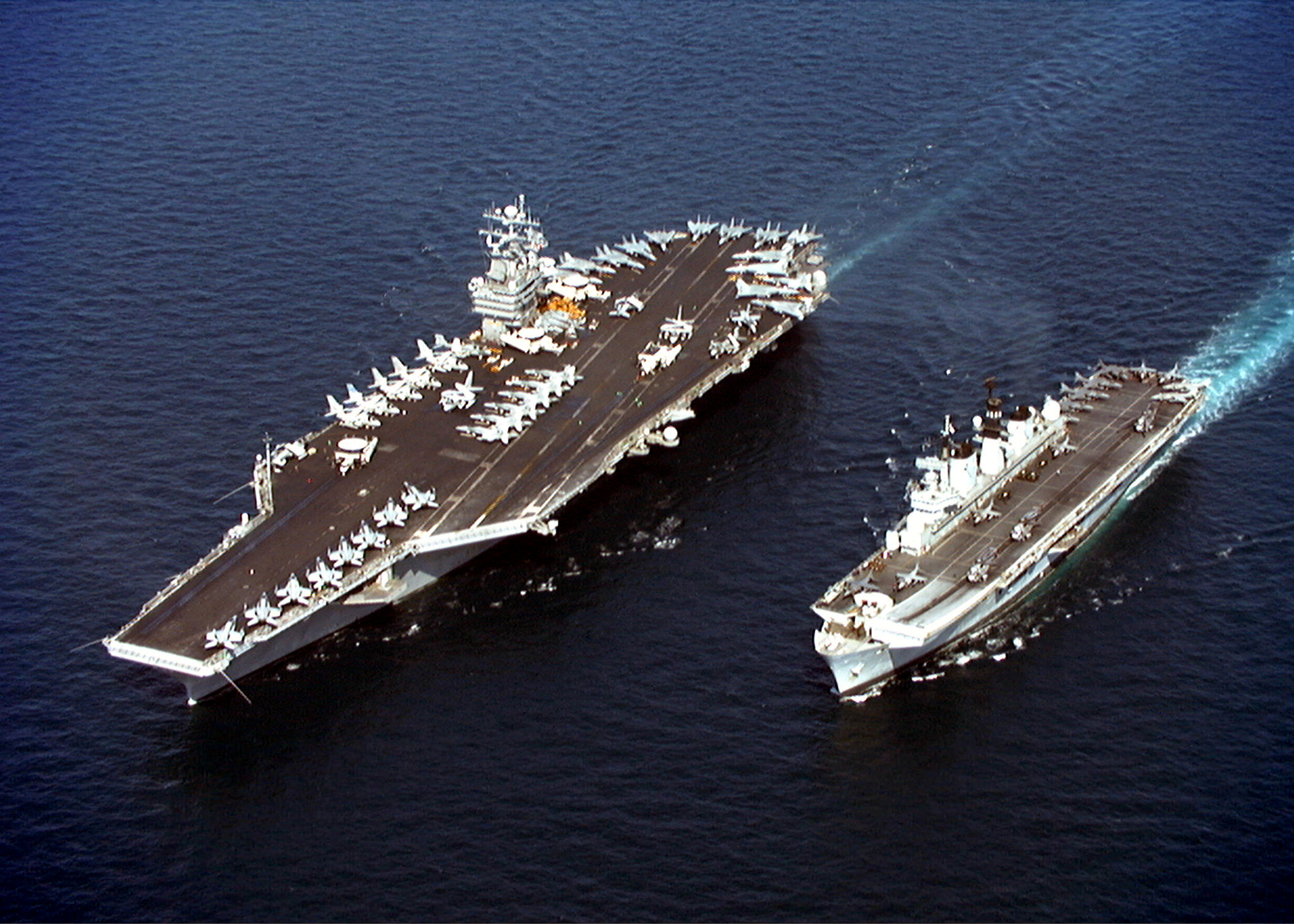
HMS Illustrious (right) with the nuclear-powered aircraft carrier USS John C. Stennis

In the aftermath of the Falklands, the typical air group was three AEW Sea Kings, nine ASW Sea Kings and eight or nine Sea Harriers. Analysis of the Sea Harrier's performance during the war led to the requirement for an upgrade, approval for which was granted in 1984. The Sea Harrier FA.2 entered service in 1993 and deployed on Invincible to Bosnia in 1994. The FA2 featured the Blue Vixen radar which was described as one of the most advanced pulse Doppler radars in the world. The FA2 carried the AIM-120 AMRAAM. The final new build Sea Harrier FA2 was delivered on 18 January 1999. Other improvements were made to the class during the 1980s and early 1990s, in particular to increase the ski-jump exit angle on Invincible and Illustrious to 12° to match Ark Royal.

== Modernization ==
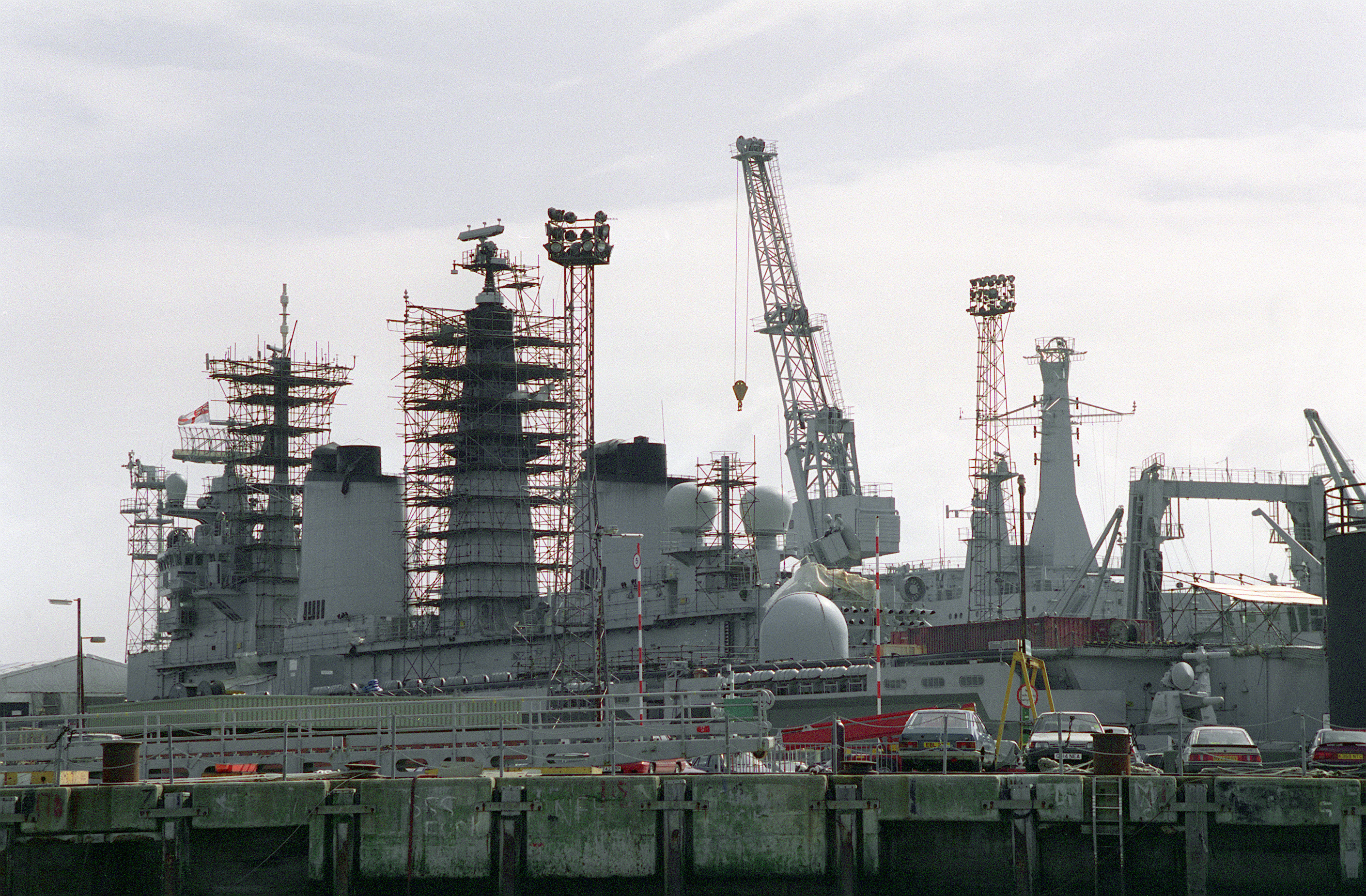
Invincible undergoing overhaul and modernisation

In later years, three other changes were made. One was the removal of the Sea Dart system, creating an increased deck park for aircraft. The Sea Dart magazines were converted to increase air-to-surface weapons stowage, and new aircrew briefing facilities created under the extended flight deck, both to support the embarkation of RAF Harrier GR7s as a routine part of the air group. The ships were all fitted to handle Merlin helicopters as the Merlin HM1 replaced the Sea King HAS6 in the carrier-borne ASW role. Following the integration of the Harrier GR7, typical deployments included seven or eight of those aircraft, pushing the Merlin onto the carrier's accompanying Fort-class auxiliaries.

The last wartime deployments of the class saw them in their secondary LPH role, as it was officially judged that Sea Harriers could provide no useful role in the missions. During those deployments, the class embarked RAF Chinook helicopters, in lieu of their fixed-wing complement.

Invincible's final refit was in 2004.

Illustrious underwent a 16-month £40 million refit at Rosyth Dockyard during 2010 and 2011 in preparation for her new role as a helicopter carrier during the refit of HMS Ocean.

== Final years ==
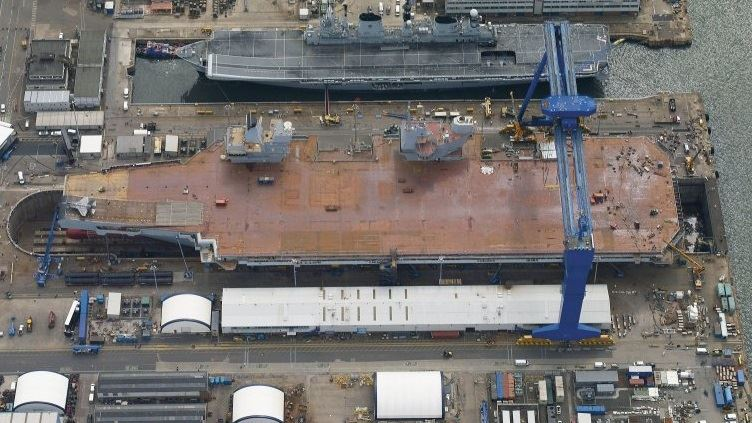
Illustrious (top) moored alongside Queen Elizabeth at Rosyth in 2014, showing the difference in size between the Invincible class and the ships that replaced them

The Sea Harrier was officially retired on 1 April 2006. The principal weapon of the Invincible-class carriers then became the Harrier GR9 flown by two Fleet Air Arm and two RAF squadrons until they were retired in 2010.

Invincible was decommissioned in July 2005, and was mothballed until September 2010. On 24 March 2011 Invincible left Portsmouth under tow for scrapping at Leyal Ship Recycling, Turkey.

Ark Royal took over as the flagship, was planned to be decommissioned in 2016, but retired in 2010 following the Strategic Defence and Security Review.

Illustrious remained the only one of the class in service, but was also retired in 2014. After being laid up it left Portsmouth under tow to the shipbreakers in Turkey on 7 December 2016.

Two larger Queen Elizabeth-class aircraft carriers replaced the Invincible class, with the first, HMS Queen Elizabeth, commissioned in late 2017. They displace around 65,000 tonnes each – more than three times the displacement of the Invincible class.

== Ships in class ==
| Name | Pennant | Image | Builder | Ordered | Laid down | Launched | Commissioned | Fate |
|---|---|---|---|---|---|---|---|---|
| Invincible | R05 | | Vickers Armstrong, Barrow | 17 April 1973 | 20 July 1973 | 3 May 1977 | 11 July 1980 | Broken up at Aliağa, 2011 |
| Illustrious | R06 | | Swan Hunter, Wallsend | 14 May 1976 | 7 October 1976 | 1 December 1978 | 20 June 1982 | Broken up at Aliağa, 2017 |
| Ark Royal (ex-Indomitable) | R07 | | Swan Hunter, Wallsend | December 1978 | 14 December 1978 | 2 June 1981 | 1 November 1985 | Broken up at Aliağa, 2013 |
