= Type 1022 radar =

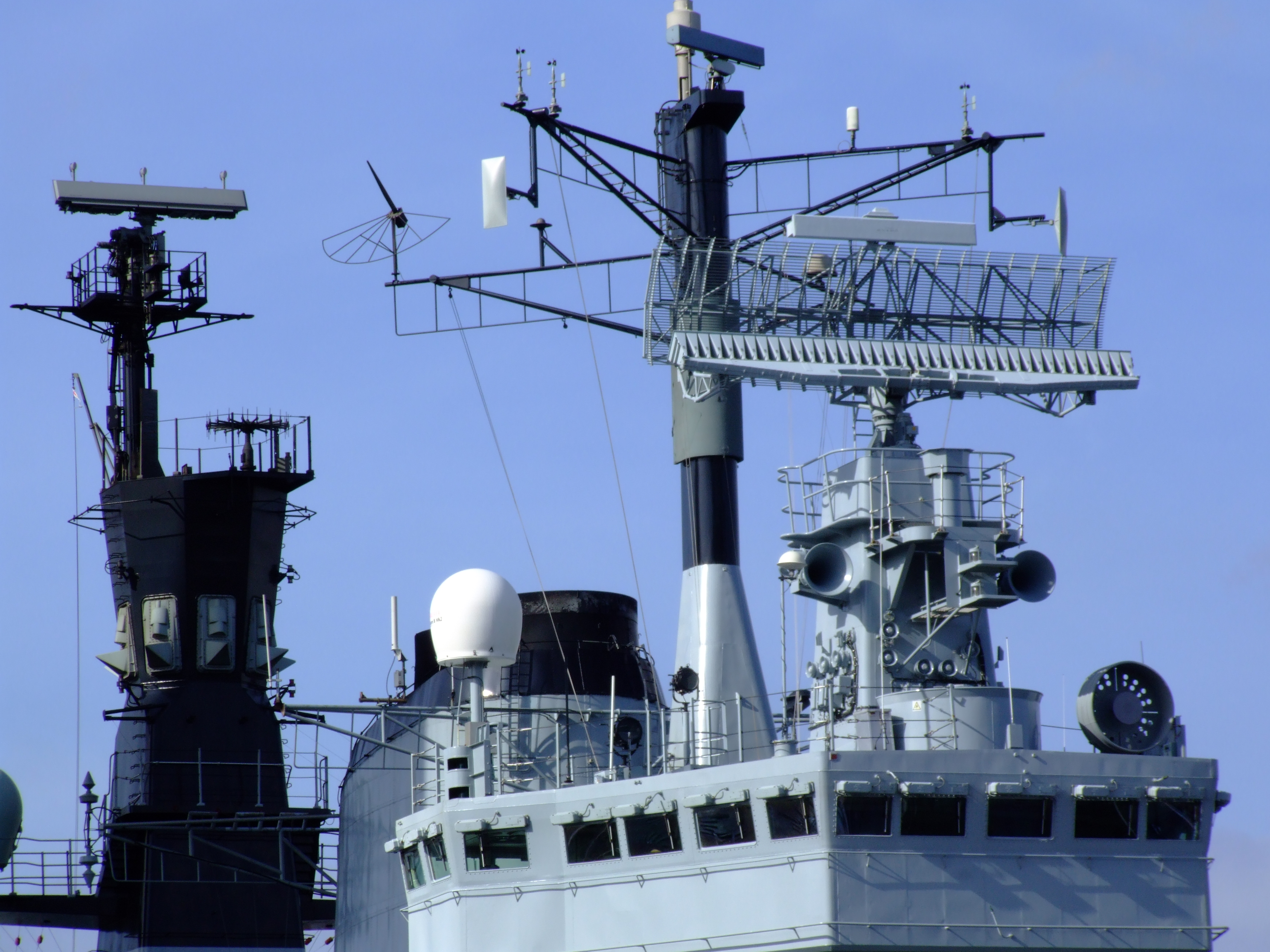
Type 1022 radar on HMS Illustrious

The Type 1022 was an L-Band, long range, surveillance radar used by the Royal Navy. It is described as a STIR, Surveillance, and Target Identification Radar.

== Introduction ==
Following trials on HMS Grenville, Type 1022 was first installed in HMS Exeter in 1978, and HMS Invincible in 1979. Following successful implementation in newly built warships it was then adopted in further units during refit; these include: Early (Sheffield Class) Type 42 destroyer, Type 82 destroyer.

== Performance ==
During the Falklands War many ships were fitted with the older Type 965 and 992Q radar systems. They were ineffective against the low flying aircraft using land for cover. The 1022 upgrade allowed better target acquisition on low flying, ground hugging targets. The Type 1022 radar is described as having a "much improved performance" compared with the Type 965, "particularly in picking out targets against a background of clutter and interference produced by unwanted returns or enemy jamming."

== Technical specifications ==
Beam Width: 2.3°
Range: 225 nm (~259 miles)
Rotations speed: 6-8 RPM
Band/Wavelength: 1–2 GHz (Civil L-Band, Military D-Band)
