= Ruelle Foundry =

French Arms manufacturing company

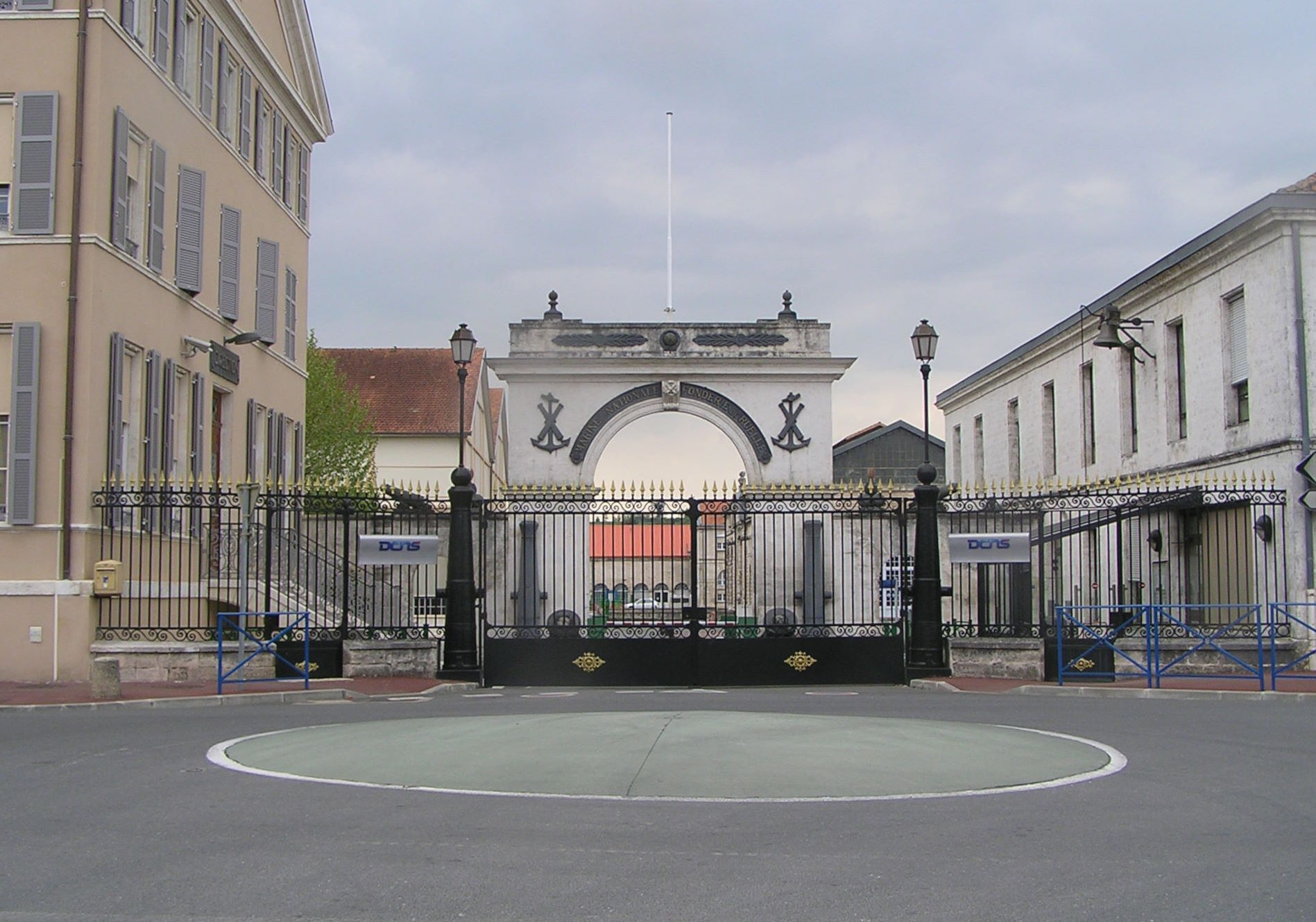
- Gate of the company grounds in 2010
- Industry: Defense
- Founded: 1753
- Headquarters: Ruelle-sur-Touvre, France
- Key people: Marc René, marquis de Montalembert
- Products: Cannon, Missiles

The Ruelle Foundry or fonderie de Ruelle is a cannon foundry which was established in 1753. Since then, it has played a major role in providing weapons for the French Armed Forces. As cannons fell out of popular use, the foundry evolved to specialize in producing guided missiles. It is now part of Naval Group.

== Context ==
=== The Touvre ===
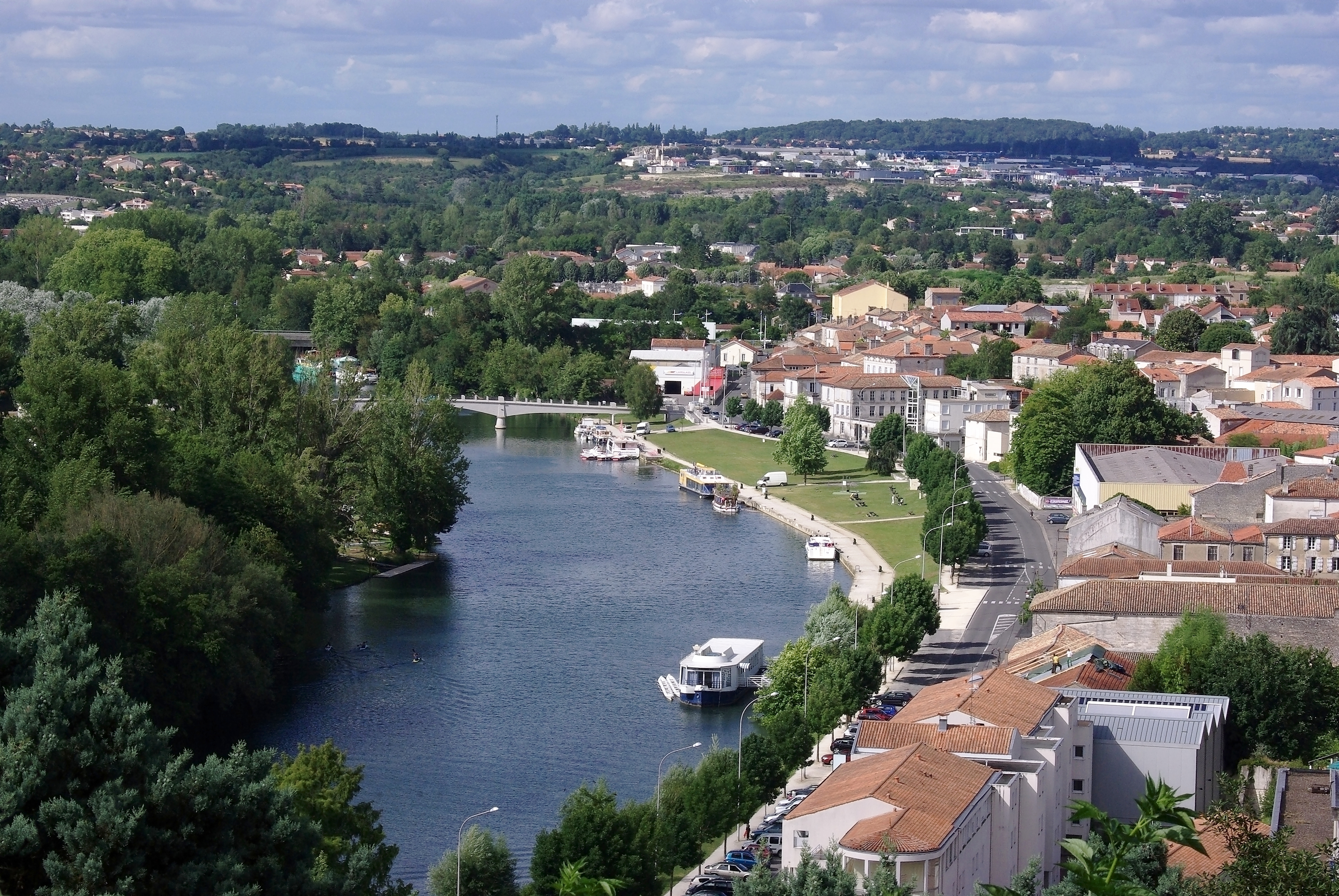
L'Houmeau, inland harbor of Angoulême

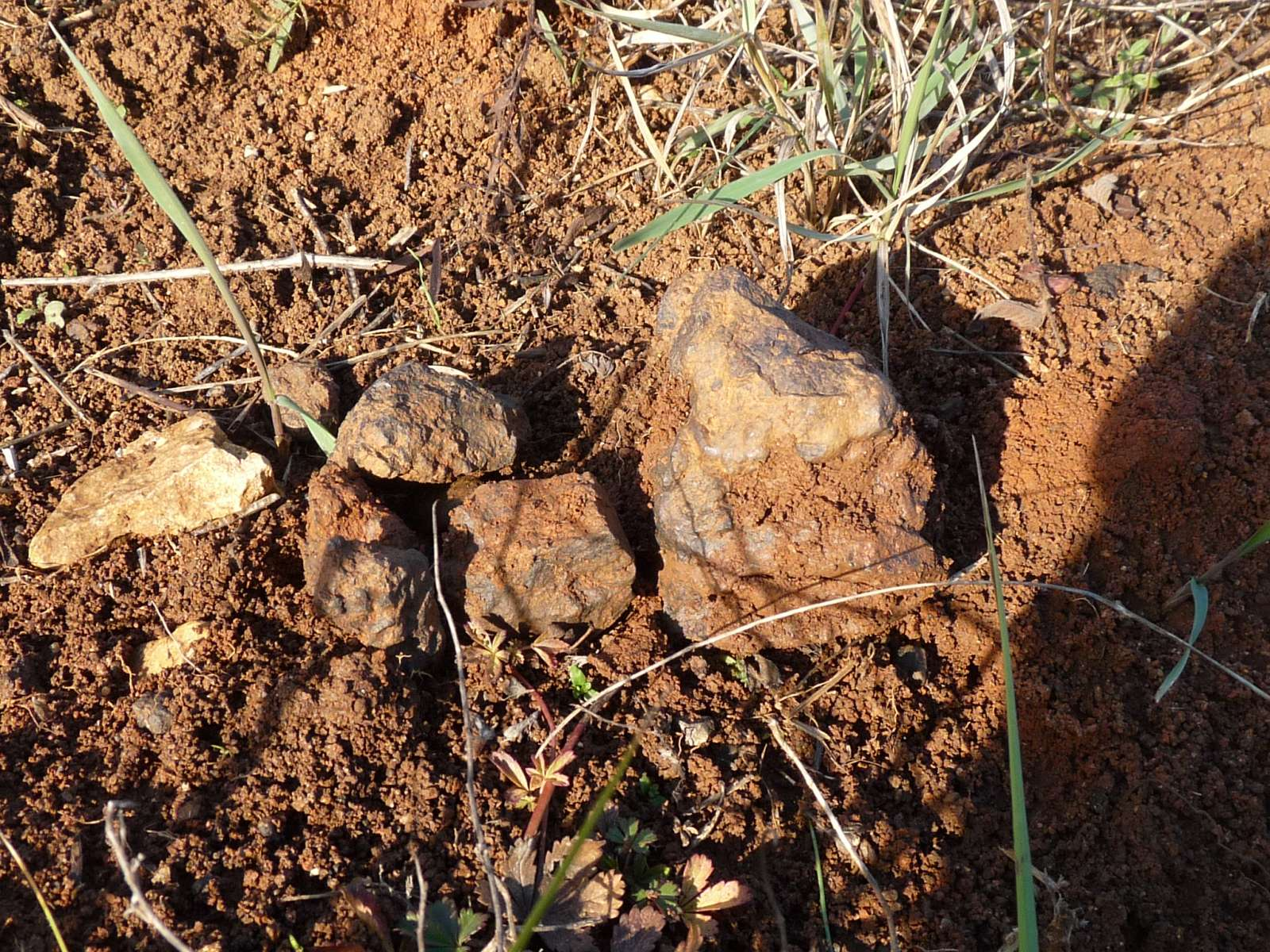
Iron ore in a field at Souffrignac

Ruelle-sur-Touvre was chosen as the site of a gun foundry because of the river Touvre, a short (11.7 km) tributary of the Charente, which it joins on the outskirts of Angoulême. The location of the river provided access to both hydropower and weapons transport.

The Touvre is fed by four springs known as the Sources de la Touvre. These springs well up from the Karst aquifers of La Rochefoucauld. The small rivers Tardoire and Bandiat, both about 100 km long, disappear into the Karst and later resurge to create the Touvre.

While short in length, a significant volume of water runs through the Touvre. During the summer, it actually discharges more water than the Charente itself. This high volume of discharge makes the river a reliable source of hydropower varying between 127 and 415 hp, depending on the season. Even in 1870, this was enough to move all the machinery that the factory and its 400 employees used. Because the Karst aquifers that feed the Touvre never freeze, the river is a reliable source of power year round.

The Charente becomes a navigable river after the Touvre joins it at L'Houmeau, a town quarter and the inland port of Angoulême. Before the advent of the railways, a navigable river was vital for a naval gun foundry. While it was possible to move naval guns over land, the heavy cast iron from which they were forged made it a very costly affair.

=== Charcoal and iron ===
Ruelle was also an attractive site for a foundry due to the proximity of useful mineral deposits. At Ruelle, most of the iron ore came from nearby Périgord. There were also many forests nearby. These provided the charcoal which provided the heat for the metallurgical processes.

== History ==
=== Up to the 1840s ===
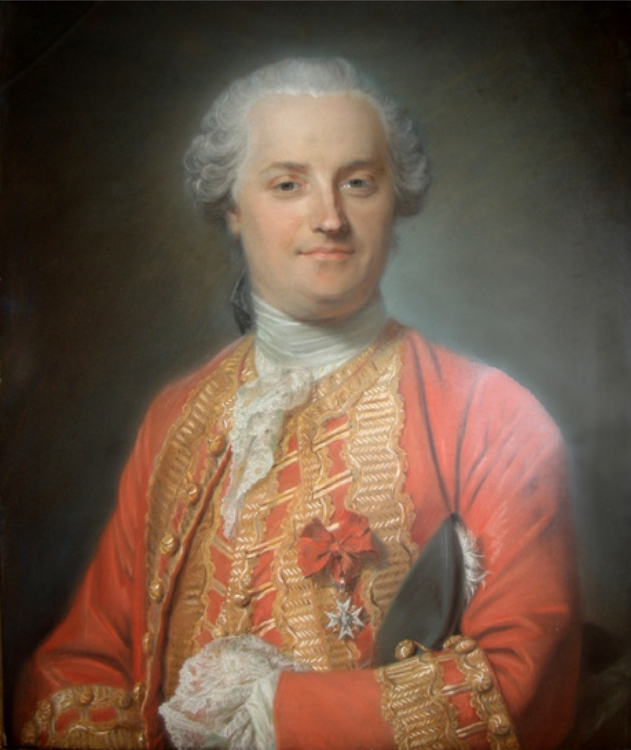
Marc René marquis de Montalembert (1714–1800)

Until the mid-18th century, what is now the foundry was the site of a paper mill. In June 1723, Claude-André de la Tache and his wife bought the paper mill from the Lord of Ruelle. In June 1750, Marc René, marquis de Montalembert and his brother, the Chevalier de Monalembert, bought the paper mill from André de la Tache and Jean-André de la Boissière, who held it as a fief from the lord of Ruelle. The price was a perpetual rent of 365 livres a year. On the foundations of the paper mill, the marquis established a foundry for casting large cannons. In 1752, he received a permit to cut down 4,800 arpents of forest over a period of nine years in the woods of Braconne, northeast of Ruelle.

In 1755, the French government took possession of the foundry. The Marquise de Montalembert fought for recognition of his rights as lord of the foundry for 16 years before eventually succeeding on 20 September 1772. However, the government immediately forced him to rent it out to the state for 20,000 livres a year, plus a sum for the previous expropriation. In 1774, the Marquis d'Artois (later king Charles X of France) bought the lordship over the foundries of Ruelle and Forge-Neuve for 300,000 livres. In this transaction, the machinery and other movable possessions of the companies were valued at 60,000 livres.

In 1776, the king of France took possession of both foundries. In return, he gave the count of Artois three forests in the Champagne region: those of Vassy, Saint-Dizier, and Sainte-Menehould. This was a very profitable trade for the counts. After the state took control, the foundry was first managed by directors, later by businessmen who rented the mill from the state. The underlying perpetual rent of 365 livres was paid up until 1790.

During the French Revolution and the wars that followed, the foundry was very busy. Many scientists and civil servants with very strong mandates directed the foundry. Ruelle was entirely renovated. It got two reverberatory furnaces, halls where the cannons were cast, and new installations to bore the cannons. This period saw a change from casting directly from the blast furnaces (en première fusion) to casting from a reverbatory furnace (deuxième fusion).

In 1840, the bronze gun foundry and boring facility of Rochefort was transferred to Ruelle. In 1846, a chemical laboratory was established. Up to 1866, the facilities at Ruelle were continuously updated and changed, as many major foreign heavy industries were during that period.

=== Modern Artillery ===
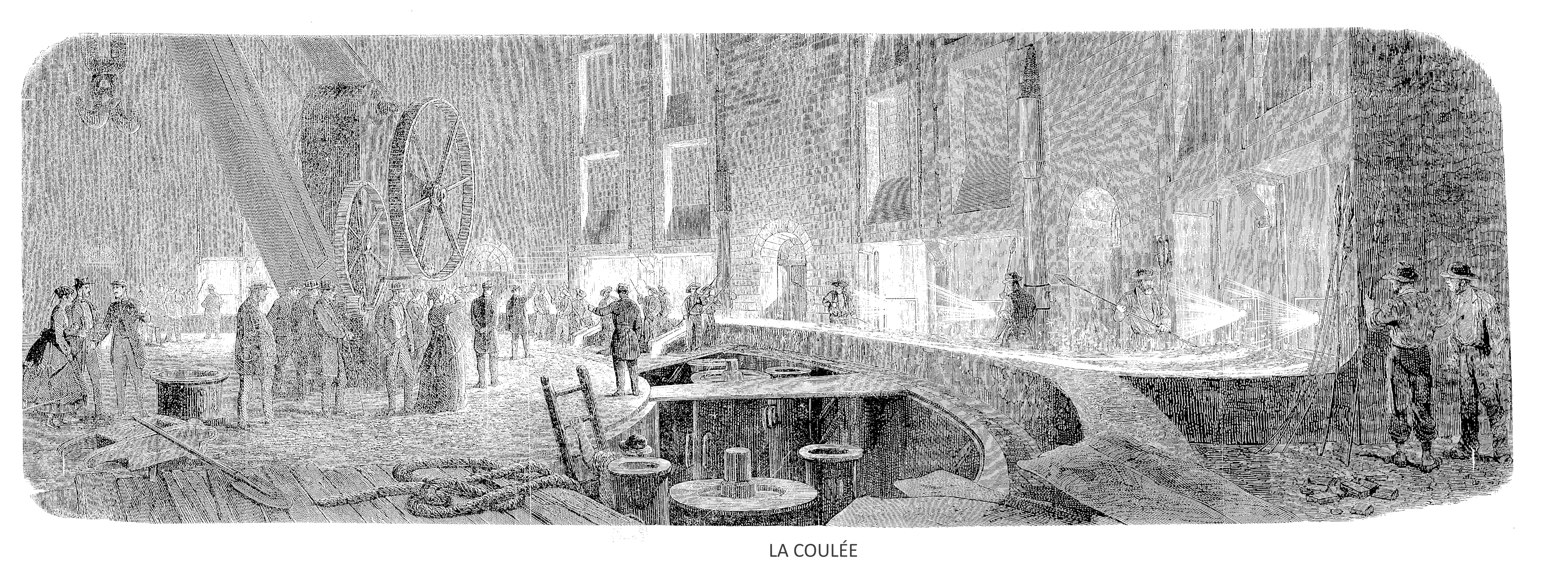
Casting guns at Ruelle

What is now considered to be modern artillery resulted from developments that took place in the mid-to-late 19th century. At the time, several improvements in underlying technologies such as metallurgy and chemistry converged to create new possibilities. It led to the construction of breech-loading rifled cannons that could fire at a much greater muzzle velocity than the traditional smoothbore muzzleloaders. In France, these weapons were first made of cast iron.

=== Cast iron rifled guns ===
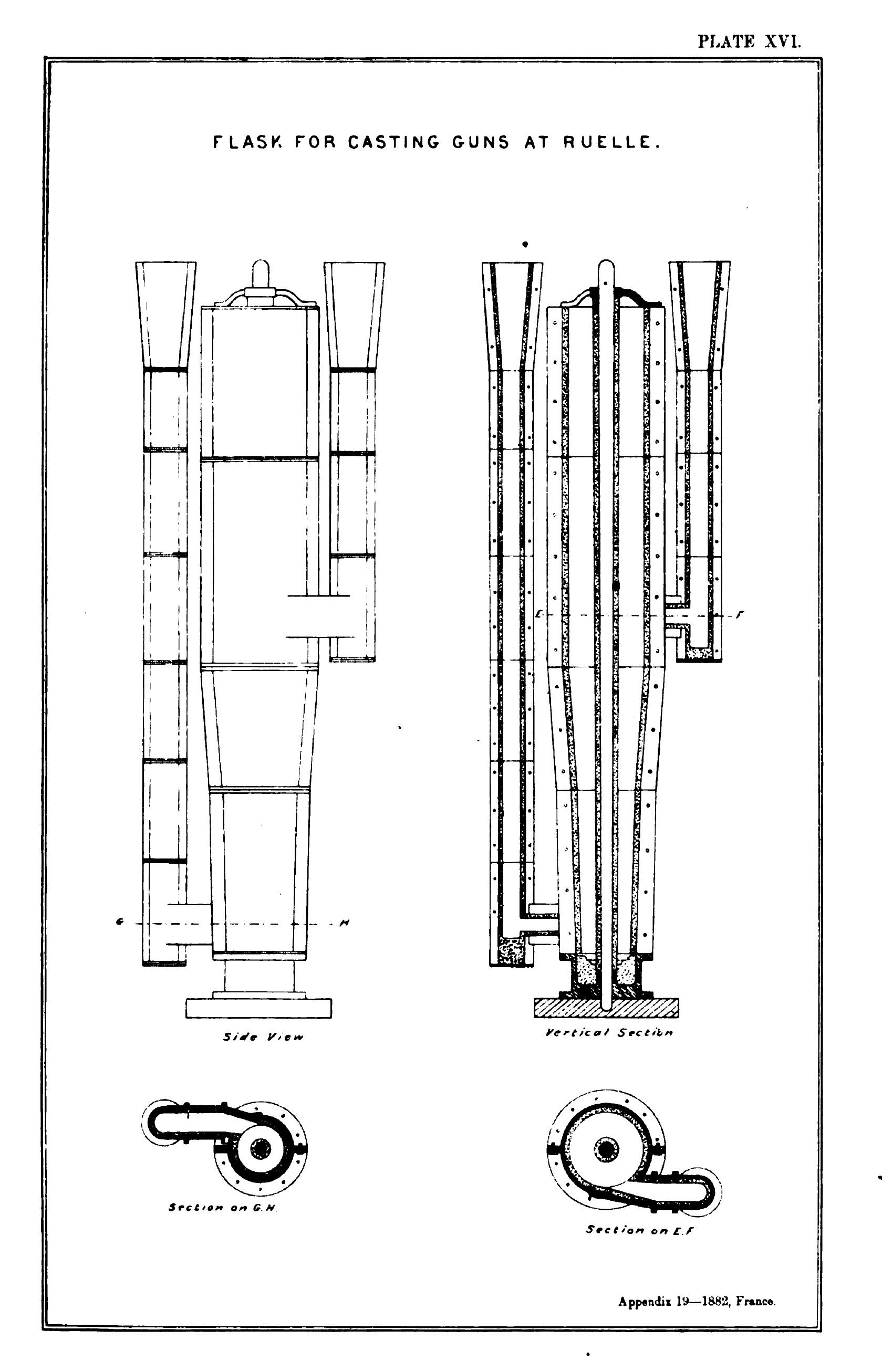
Flask for casting at Ruelle

For the early 1850s, some production numbers are known. In 1852, Ruelle produced 112 30-pounders; in 1853, 85; and in the first half of 1854, 121 30-pounders, 12 50-pounders, and 213 iron coastal gun carriages. Many of these guns were produced for the Crimean War, which started in October 1853 and lasted till March 1856.

All of these guns were traditional smoothbore muzzleloaders, except for the new 50-pounder gun that was tested in 1845. The latter was an example of another development, the construction of very heavy smoothbore muzzleloaders. The 50-pounder was a regular gun that actually fired a bullet weighing 50 pounds. Previously tested models were 60- or 80-pdr shell guns that fired a much lighter-weight shot that only had the circumference of a 60 or 80 pound bullet.

The first rifled guns of the French Navy were the 16 cm modèle 1855 gun and the modèle 1858-1860 guns. Most of the modèle 1858-1860 guns were smoothbore muzzleloaders changed to rifled guns. Only one of the seven modèle 1858-1860 guns was a breechloader. These rifled guns fired an ogive-shaped projectile of about twice the weight of the spherical bullet. The increased weight of the projectile and charge necessitated the use of steel hoops, which were shrunk onto the barrel.

The M 1864-1866 family of guns consisted of new designs. These guns were all breech loaders. They used a more rational way of hooping, had a screw breech loading system, and proper obturation. They fired a projectile three times the weight of the spherical projectile.

When the mid to late-1860s description of the Ruelle facilities was made, they were busy producing the M 1864-1866 guns. At the time, the smaller calibers and the Canon de 24 C modèle 1864 were in production, while the Canon de 27 C modèle 1864 had not yet been approved. The description was accompanied by a series of engravings of the model 1864 guns as they were produced. These were centered on the 24 cm gun and showed images of its barrel before and after it was hooped, of its trunnion ring, and of its breech block and obturator.

The model 1864 was followed by the model 1870 guns. These were built-up guns with a short steel inner tube inside the cast iron core. A visiting American delegating gave a description of how the guns were cast at Ruelle, but also noted that the use of cast-iron was no longer practical.

=== Assembly and finishing of steel guns ===
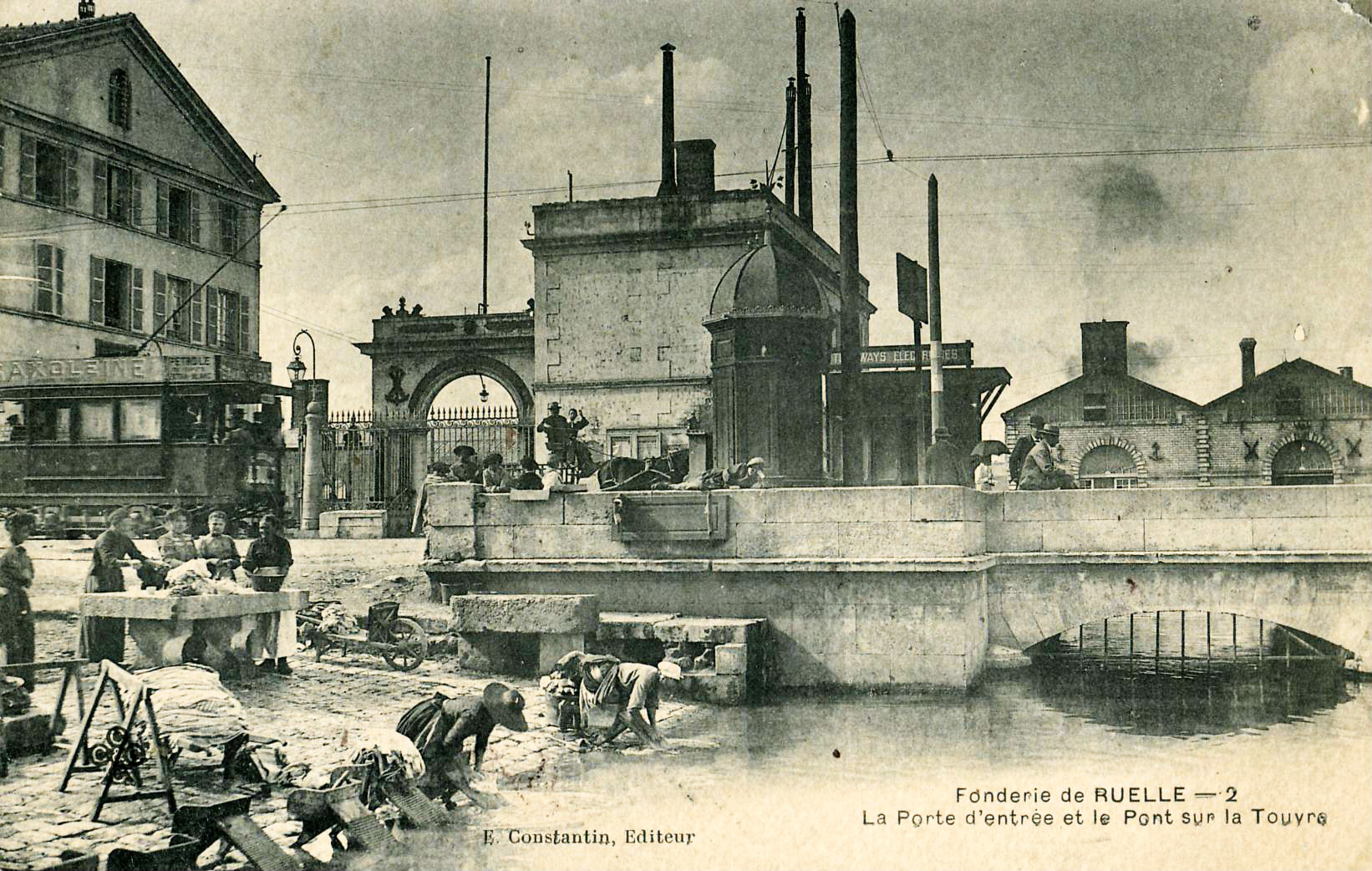
In about 1900

The lost 1870-1871 Franco-Prussian War led to big changes in the French armament industry. The manufacture of guns had been long been organized by state companies. These were Ruelle and Nevers for the navy; and Bourges, Puteaux and Tarbes for the army. This system was no longer practical, especially as cast iron fell out of favor and production began to switch to cast steel.

Making large, all-steel guns required massive forgings. To encourage private industry, the French government invested in forging equipment, such as large steam hammers. A new division of labour was developed, in which only Compagnie des forges et aciéries de la marine et d'Homécourt at Saint-Chamond and Schneider et Cie at Le Creusot cast the all-steel barrels for guns of a caliber higher than 16 cm. Government installments, like Ruelle, machined and assembled these guns. For foundry work, the government depended on private industry.

For big steel naval guns, Ruelle became the sole assembly and finishing plant. The factory at Nevers was closed down in 1880. Its inventory and employees were moved to Ruelle. Ruelle's new role required the design and setup of what was effectively a new plant. It took about five years to build. The heavy machinery was made by Varall, Elwell & Middleton. A 100-ton hydraulic crane to load guns into barges was made by Fives-Lille, which also made a 120-ton railway truck.

A late 1880s overview of production of the steel model 1881 guns (ranging from 24-23 cm) describes the following chain of production: The steel corps or main body came from Creusot or Saint-Chamond, or occasionally from the Firth. The steel frettes or rings, which had never been made by Ruelle, came also from Saint-Chamond, Saint Etienne, and Creusot. The breech pieces came from Saint Chamond, Saint-Etienne, and Saint Ouen. The inner tubes were made by Saint Chamond, on the Firth, and probably at Ruelle.

=== Ammunition ===
For the steel ammunition of its heavy guns, the navy relied on private industry. Ruelle did start to produce cast-iron ammunition in about 1885. This had been caused by defects in the cast-iron projectiles made by private industry. When fired with a high charge, many of these got stuck in the barrel. Since then, the navy ordered only exercise grenades of cast iron from private industry.

=== Cartridges ===
In about 1890, Ruelle began to produce the brass cartridges required for quick-firing guns. By 1890, it had invested 1,200,000 Francs into machinery to make these cartridges. Cartridges were relatively expensive, costing almost 4 Franc per kg to make. At first, Ruelle bought its brass from third parties, but by 1898 it produced its own.

=== Interwar period ===
A financial periodical from 1922 reported that Ruelle could make steel guns of up to 10 tons, iron guns of up to 40 tons, and bronze guns of up to 20 tons.

During the Interwar period, the Ruelle foundry was no longer able to produce the steel parts required for a gun of more than 100 mm caliber. For bigger pieces, it had to rely on private industry. Their partnerships included Usines de la Loire, Le Creusot, Usine Saint-Jacques at Montluçon, and Société J. F. Cail & Cie in Denain.

For large cannons, Ruelle then specialized in usinage, autofrettage and assembly. Usinage was about the internal boring and grooving and the external finishing of the barrel. Autofrettage was about putting a very strong hydraulic pressure on the inside of the barrel, increasing its resistance to peak pressures.

At the time, ammunition remained an important part of Ruelle's production output.

=== World War II ===
During World War II, a large portion of the foundry's archives were destroyed during the occupation. Production data from this period has been lost.

During the Liberation of France, the Brigade RAC of the French resistance captured some light artillery in August 1944. These guns had been sabotaged before capture, and so the idea came up to use Ruelle Foundry to repair and repurpose captured weapons. In the end, 10 75 mm anti-aircraft guns were put on carriages for land use. Five more pieces of 75, 105, 25 (x2) and 37 mm were made serviceable. Another 17 20 mm auto-cannon and aerial pieces were put on carriages. It was a ragtag collection of artillery, but it was quite effective.

=== New names for the Ruelle foundry ===
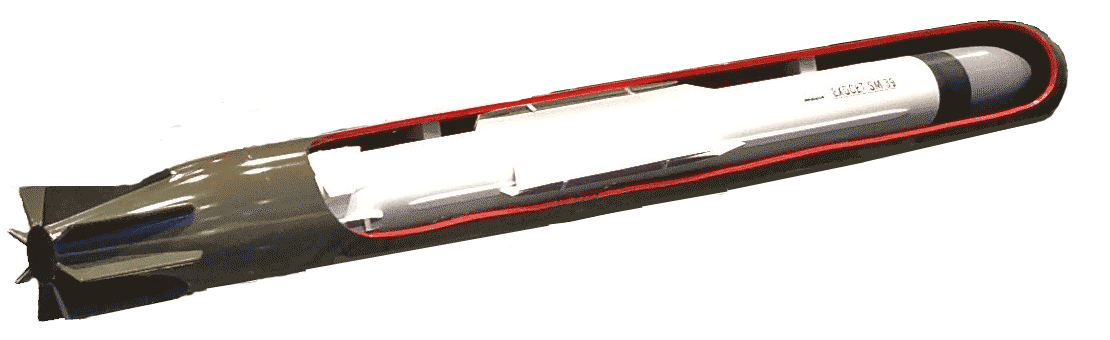
The SM-39

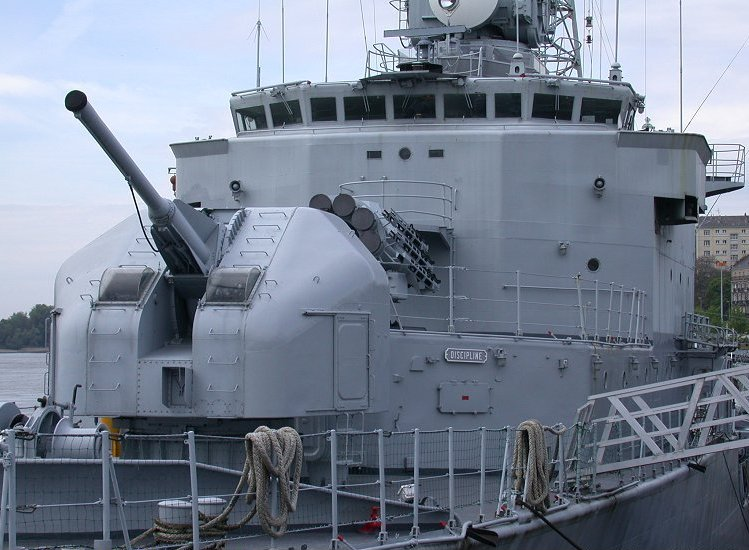
The 100 mm modèle 1953

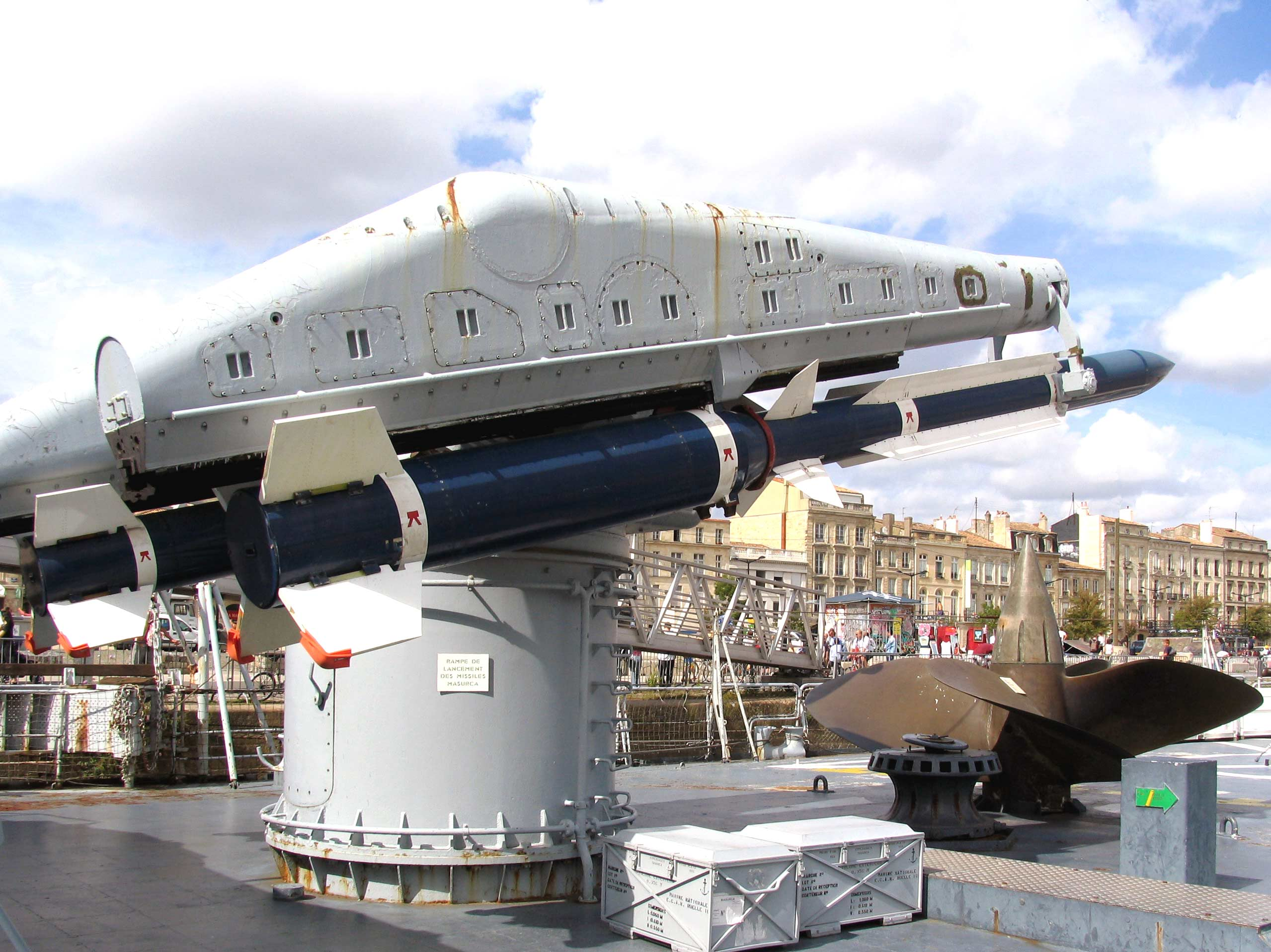
Masurca system on Colbert

After World War II, the Ruelle Foundry saw many organizational changes. In 1970, it became the ECAN (Etablissement de Constructions d'Armes Navales). In 1990, it became the DCN Ruelle. In 2000, DCN left the DGA (Délégation Générale pour l’Armement) and became an SCN (Service à Compétence Nationale). In 2003, the SCN became a private company.

=== Post World War II products ===
In 1945, French manufacturers were largely uninterested in producing missiles and rockets, which pushed the state to take on a major role in rearmament. The navy made its first attempts to produce missile weapons by copying German weapons. The arsenal (ECAN) of Ruelle took up the development of surface-to-air missiles.

In 1949, Ruelle started to develop the subsonic Maruca (Marine Ruelle Contre Avions) based on the German Hs 117 Schmetterling Missile. The Maruca's propulsion system made it impractical to use in service. However, the project was useful in developing the French missile industry.

The Maruca was followed by the medium-range area defence missile Masurca, 'su' for supersonique. The Masurca system was put into service aboard the two Suffren-class frigates, and the cruiser Colbert. It did not find wider adoption, in part because it required a ship of at least about 5,000 tons to mount it.

In 1974, the French government chose to prioritize air-launched anti-ship missiles, followed in 1978 by a decision to prioritize for those launched from submarines. Matra developed a system for submarines together with ECAN. It was based on the Martel vehicle and used guidance equipment from the Otomat missile, which it had developed together with OTO Melara. In both cases, the competing AM-39 Exocet and its submarine version, SM 39, were designed by stated-owned Aérospatiale wun. The emergence of Aérospatiale as a leader in missile development marked the end of Ruelle as a missile manufacturer.

ECAN nevertheless participated in the submarine Exocet SM-39 project. This model has a launching capsule that carries the missile from the submarine to a position about 30 m above sea level, where it is launched. This version was put into service in 1985.

ECAN also produced the Canon de 100 mm modèle 53. It was designed by STCAN (Service technique des constructions et armes navales) as a multi-purpose gun for use against naval, aerial, and land targets. The gun was first tested on board in 1958 and was widely used in the French and foreign navies. It was succeeded by the modèle 64, modèle 68, and modèle 100 TR.

== Buildings at Ruelle ==
=== Public visitation ===
While Ruelle has always been a military site, it has occasionally been used to host events for the public. There were at least three events that gave the public a view of the site: the 1867 Exposition Universelle in Paris, Ardouin-Dumazet's Voyage en France, and the creation of the inventory of heritage objects finished in 1990.

=== Late 1860s production process ===
In the late 1860s, a comprehensive description of the facilities was published. It started with the description of the raw materials that were used. These were charcoal, coke, bituminous coal, casting sand, briques et pièces de four réfractaires, limestone (as castines), iron ore, and iron high in carbon but 'polluted' with other minerals (fontes du commerce). There was a storage for 2,000 tons of charcoal at the foundry grounds. This was enough to fire the blast furnaces for one casting round. The charcoal was made of oak, hornbeam, European beech, and sometimes chestnut trees. All these were between 15 and 25 years old and turned into coal together with their bark. In general, the weight of the charcoal that was made, was 17% or more of the weight of the trees as they were cut. In volume, this was 27%.

Ruelle used cast iron made by blast furnaces. Not all the cast iron used for casting guns at Ruelle came from its own blast furnaces. The blast furnaces of Jaumellières and La Chapelle, and those of La Motte near Feuillade also provided cast iron. More recently, de l'Alélick in Algeria has provided Iron. Prior to construction, there was some discussion about whether Ruelle should have its own blast furnaces, because commercial parties said that they could provide cast iron at a lower price. The blast furnaces at Ruelle were 8 m high and 1.92 m wide. Two wind tunnels provided the high speed wind which was blasted through tuyeres to attain the high temperatures required. Nine people were required to operate a blast furnace, four of whom loaded the furnace. At the time, the hall of the blast furnaces la halle des hauts fourneaux was one of the oldest buildings of the complex. About 40% of the iron used for casting at Ruelle came from its own blast furnaces. Another 20% came from recycled guns or tools, leaving 40% bought from other suppliers. In 1868, Ruelle's own blast furnaces were closed down.

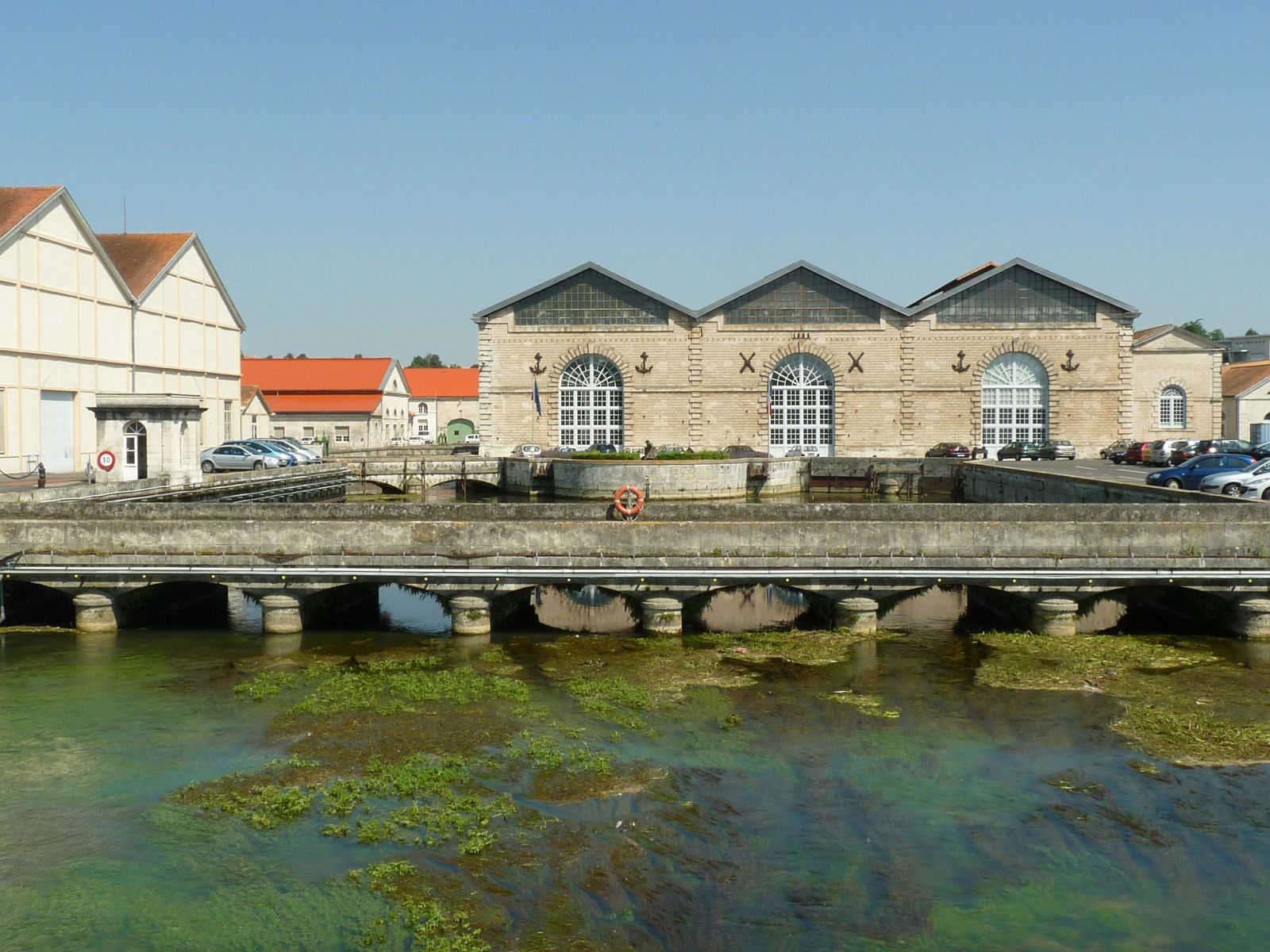
Multiple canals were dug to feed the mills at Ruelle

The casting hall la halle de fonderie was surrounded by the furnaces. These were made from brick reinforced by iron ties. These furnaces were fired by bituminous coal and remelted the products of the blast furnaces and other metals. The reverbatory furnaces were meant to melt the metal in about two hours. Inside were the molds, which were made from sand using a wooden model of the form of the desired gun. At the time guns were not only cast in iron, but also still in bronze. After casting, the metal took 1.5 to 5 hours to solidify. After that, it took several days before the gun could be removed from the mold.

The next step in the process was to bore the gun. For this, it was brought to the ateliers de forerie (forer means 'to bore') At the time, there were two of those at Ruelle, with a third being built.

An 1869 description of the water mills at Ruelle made the importance of hydraulic power at Ruelle more explicit. There were 11 water wheels and 8 turbines. The most powerful of these were two 36 hp turbines that drove the newest boring facility.

By 1869, there were multiple railways that supplied the facilities. The big guns made at Ruelle were transported overland by horsepower to Angoulême, 7 kilometers away. From there, they could be transported by rail or by barge to Rochefort.

=== Heritage inventory ===
In the late 1980s, authorities made an inventory of the heritage objects at the Ruelle Foundry. This included a large series of black and white photos made in 1989, showing several monumental buildings.
