= French frigate Suffren =

French Suffren Class frigate

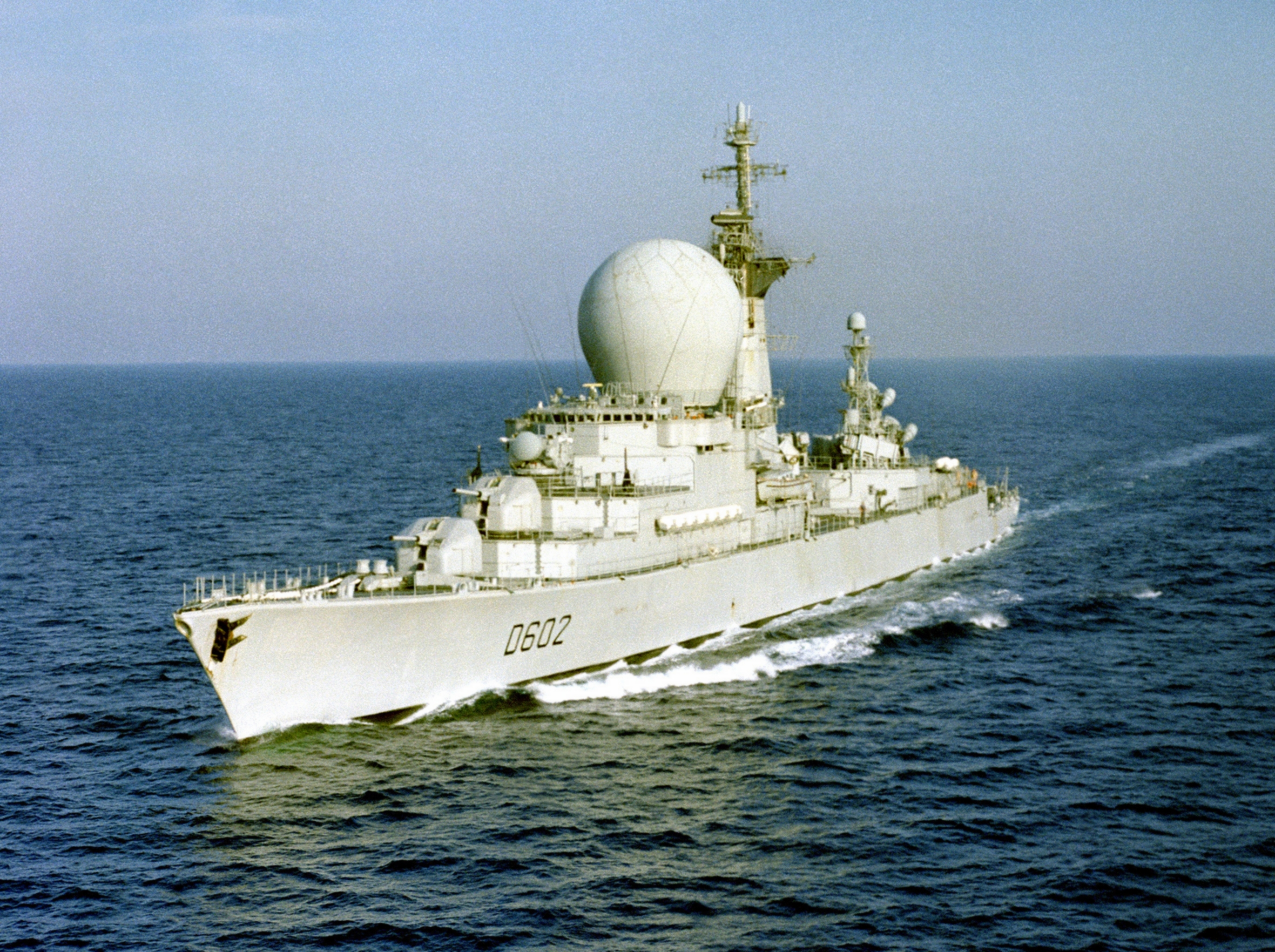
- Suffren in 1983

History

France
- Name: Suffren
- Namesake: Pierre André de Suffren
- Builder: Lorient arsenal
- Laid down: 21 December 1962
- Launched: 15 May 1965
- Commissioned: 1 October 1967
- Decommissioned: 2 April 2001
- Identification: Pennant number: D602

General characteristics
- Type: Suffren-class frigate
- Displacement: 5,335 t (5,251 long tons) (standard); 6,780 t (6,670 long tons) (full load)
- Length: 157.6 m (517 ft 1 in) oa
- Beam: 15.54 m (51 ft 0 in)
- Draught: 7.4 m (24 ft 3 in)
- Propulsion: 4 × boilers; 4 × geared turbines; 54,063 kW (72,500 shp); 2 × propellers
- Speed: 34 knots (63 km/h; 39 mph)
- Range: 5,100 nmi (9,400 km; 5,900 mi) at 18 knots (33 km/h; 21 mph)
- Complement: 355, including 23 officers
- Sensors & processing systems: DRBI 23 tridimensional sentry radar; DRBV 15 surface or low-altitude sentry radar; DRBC 33 multi-system targeting radar; DRBN 34; DRBR 51
- Electronic warfare & decoys: 2 × Sagaie decoy launchers; SLQ-25 Nixie towed decoy; ARBR 33 jammer; ARBR 17 detector
- Armament: 48 × Masurca surface-to-air missiles (DRBR 51 guided); 4 × MM38 Exocet anti-ship missiles; 10 × L5 anti-submarine torpedoes; 2 × single 100 mm turrets; 4 × single 20 mm cannons; 4 × 12.7 mm machine guns

Suffren was a Suffren-class frigate of the French Navy, designed to protect a fleet against air threats, surface ships, submarines, and, to a lesser extent, provide firepower against land objectives. She is the sister ship of Duquesne, and was decommissioned in 2001. She was the seventh French vessel named after the 18th century admiral Pierre André de Suffren.

== Background and description ==
Ships of the Suffren class were designed as anti-air and anti-submarine escorts for the Clemenceau-class aircraft carriers and were similar in concept to the British Type 82 destroyer. They were ordered in 1960 as part of France's new naval policy of deterrence/intervention/defence following the election of Charles de Gaulle as president of France. The French designation for the class was frégates lance-engins (FLE 60). They were designated as frigates by the French Navy but were considered destroyers by publications. They were later re-designated frégates lance-missiles (FLM 60).

The vessel measured 157.6 metres (517 ft 1 in) long overall and 148 m (485 ft 7 in) between perpendiculars, with a 15.54 m (51 ft 0 in) beam and a maximum draught of 7.4 m (24 ft 3 in). The ship had a standard displacement of 5,090 tonnes (5,010 long tons) and 6,090 tonnes (5,990 long tons) at full load. By 1990 the ship had a standard displacement of 5,335 t (5,251 long tons) and 6,780 t (6,670 long tons) at full load. Suffren was powered by four multi-tube, automatic control boilers creating steam for two sets of Rateau double-reduction geared turbines turning two propellers. They were rated at 54,100 kilowatts (72,500 shp). They created a total of 3,440 kW of electrical power through two 1,000 kW turbochargers and three 480 kW diesel alternators. Suffren had a maximum speed of 34 knots (63 km/h; 39 mph) and a range of 5,100 nautical miles (9,400 km; 5,900 mi) at 18 knots (33 km/h; 21 mph). The frigate had a complement of 355 sailors including 23 officers. For increased stabilisation as a weapons platform, the frigate was outfitted with three pairs of non-retractable fin stabilisers. Ships of the Suffren class were considered extremely seaworthy vessels.

The Suffren class were armed with a twin launcher situated on the quarterdeck for the Masurca surface-to-air missile. 48 missiles were carried. The frigates were also equipped with two single-mounted 100-millimetre (3.9 in) Modèle 1953 naval guns in positions 'A' and 'B' along the centreline. (Note: Prézelin states in the summary of the class that they were Modèle 1953 versions of the guns while in the explanatory silhouette, claims they are Modèle 1968.) These were later upgraded to the Modèle 1964. The frigates also mounted a Malafon anti-submarine missile system. Each ship carried 13 missiles and the magazine was situated in the aft deckhouse. Furthermore, the Suffren class had four launchers for L5 torpedoes, two to each side of the ship, housed in the deckhouse between the mast and the bridge. Each ship carried ten torpedoes. They were the first French warships to deploy torpedoes using fixed catapults.

Fire control was via the DRBI 23 3D radar for air search/tracking housed in a massive radome that dominated the ship's silhouette. The Suffren class also mounted DRBN 32, DRBV 50, two DRBR 51 and DRBC 32A radars. For anti-submarine warfare, they were equipped with DUBV 23 hull-mounted sonar and DUBV 43 towed variable depth sonar. For electronic defence, the vessels initially mounted the Syllex chaff system. The SENIT I tactical data system coordinated sensor data.

=== Modifications ===
In 1977 to 1979, the MM38 Exocet anti-ship missile system was fitted to Suffren. The ship carried four missiles. The Masurca system was upgraded between 1982–1985. Suffren had its DRBV 50 radar replaced with the advanced DRBV 15 system in 1989–1990 while also having its DRBC 32A gunfire control radar replaced with the newer DRBC 33A system. Furthermore during that refit, the Syllex outfit was replaced with the Dagaie and Sagaie electronic countermeasures systems. Additionally four single-mounted 20 mm (0.79 in) cannon were fitted two to each side of the ship abaft the DRBC 33A radar.

== Construction and career ==
Suffren was named after the French admiral Pierre André de Suffren. Suffren accompanied the Clemenceau-class aircraft carriers on deployments and as a result was based with them as part of the French Atlantic Fleet upon entering service. In 1975, when the Clemenceaus were transferred to the Mediterranean Fleet, Suffren went with them and was based at Toulon.

Suffren's service-life extension refit was delayed due to the ship's deployments to the Persian Gulf during the Iran–Iraq War. Suffren's refit took place from 1989 to 1990. Suffren was retired on 2 April 2001. The Suffren class was replaced by the Horizon-class frigates.
