= Marc René, marquis de Montalembert =

French Royal Army officer and writer

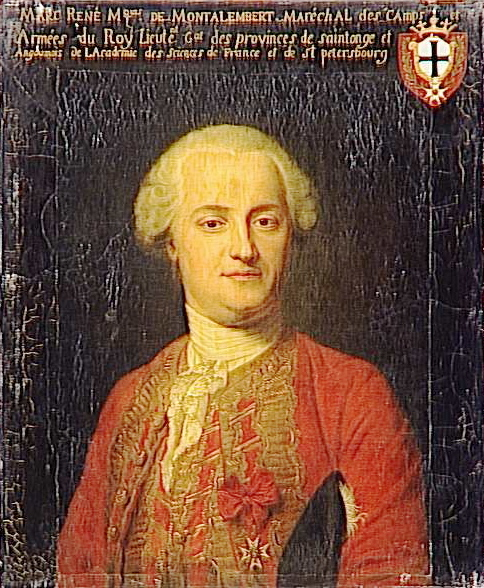
- Portrait of Montalembert by Maurice Quentin de La Tour
- Born: 16 July 1714; Angoulême
- Died: 29 March 1800 (aged 85); Paris
- Occupations: Military engineer Writer

Maréchal de camp Marc René, marquis de Montalembert (16 July 1714 – 29 March 1800) was a French Royal Army officer and writer best known for his work on fortifications and writings on military engineering.

== Life ==
He was born on 16 July 1714 at Angoulême, and joined the French Royal Army in 1732. He fought in the War of the Polish Succession on the Rhine, and in the War of the Austrian Succession made the campaigns of 1742 in Bohemia and Italy. In the years preceding the Seven Years' War, Montalembert (who had become an associate member of the Académie des Sciences in 1747) devoted his energies to the art of fortification, to which Vauban's Traité de l'attaque attracted him, and founded the cannon foundry Ruelle Foundry at Ruelle, near his birthplace.

On the outbreak of war he became French commissioner with the allied army of Sweden, with the rank of brigadier-general. He constructed the field fortifications of Anklam and Stralsund. In 1761 he was promoted to maréchal de camp, and began the works on which his fame rests. Montalembert's fortress has been aptly described by an English author as an "immense battery." The intricacies of trace by which Vauban and Cormontaigne sought to minimize the power of the attack, are abandoned in favour of a simple tenaille plan so arranged that the defenders can bring an overwhelming fire to bear on the works of the besieger.

Montalembert, who himself drew his idea from the practice of Swedish and Prussian engineers, furnished the German constructors of the early 19th century with the means of designing entrenched camps suitable to modern conditions of warfare. The "polygonal" method of fortification is the direct outcome of Montalembert's systems. In his own country the caste-spirit of the engineer corps was roused to defend Vauban, and though Montalembert was allowed to construct some successful works at Île-d'Aix and Oléron, he was forbidden to publish his method, and given but little opportunity for actual building. After fifteen years of secrecy he published in Paris (1776–1778) the first edition of La Fortification perpendiculaire.

At the time of the Revolution he surrendered a pension, which had been granted him for the loss of an eye, although he was deeply in debt, particularly on account of his Ruelle foundry, on which 6000 livres were due to him from the state, which he never received. Persuaded by his writer and actress wife, he joined in the emigration of the noblesse, and for a time lived in England. All his possessions were thereupon sequestrated by the republican government. He very soon returned, divorced his wife, and married the daughter of an apothecary. He obtained the annulment of the sequestration.

Carnot often called him into consultation on military affairs, and, in 1792, promoted him general of division. Proposed as a member of the Institut de France in 1797, he withdrew his candidature in favour of General Bonaparte.

His wife, Marie Josephine de Comarieu, was the hostess of one of the best-known salons of Louis XVI's time. She wrote two novels of merit, Elise Dumesnil (1798) and Horace (1822). She died in 1832.

== Works ==
Besides his masterpiece, he wrote L'Art défensif supérieur à l'offensif (1793; in reply to attacks made upon his earliest work, La Fortification perpendiculaire, of which in later editions it forms part); Mémoire historique sur la fonte des canons (Paris, 1758), and other works on the same subject; Correspondance pendant la guerre de 1757–1760 (London, 1777); Rotation des boulets (Acad., 1755); and Relation du siège de Saint-Jean-d'Acre (Paris, 1789).

He also wrote short stories and verse, as well as comedies. He also modelled a complete course of fortification (92 models), which he offered to the Committee of Public Safety. His bust was sculpted by Bonvallet.

Montalembert's position in the history of fortification may be summed up as a realization of his own wish to do for the defence what Vauban had done for the attack. It was the inability of his contemporaries to see that Vauban's strength lay in his parallels and batteries and not in his bastions that vitiated their methods, and it was Montalembert's appreciation of this fact which made him the father of modern fortification. See Tripier, La Fortification déduite de son histoire (Paris, 1866).

== Family ==
His nephew, also called Marc-René (1777–1831), was the father of Charles Forbes René de Montalembert, a French politician.

== See also ==
- Ruelle foundry
