= Masurca =

French naval surface-to-air missile

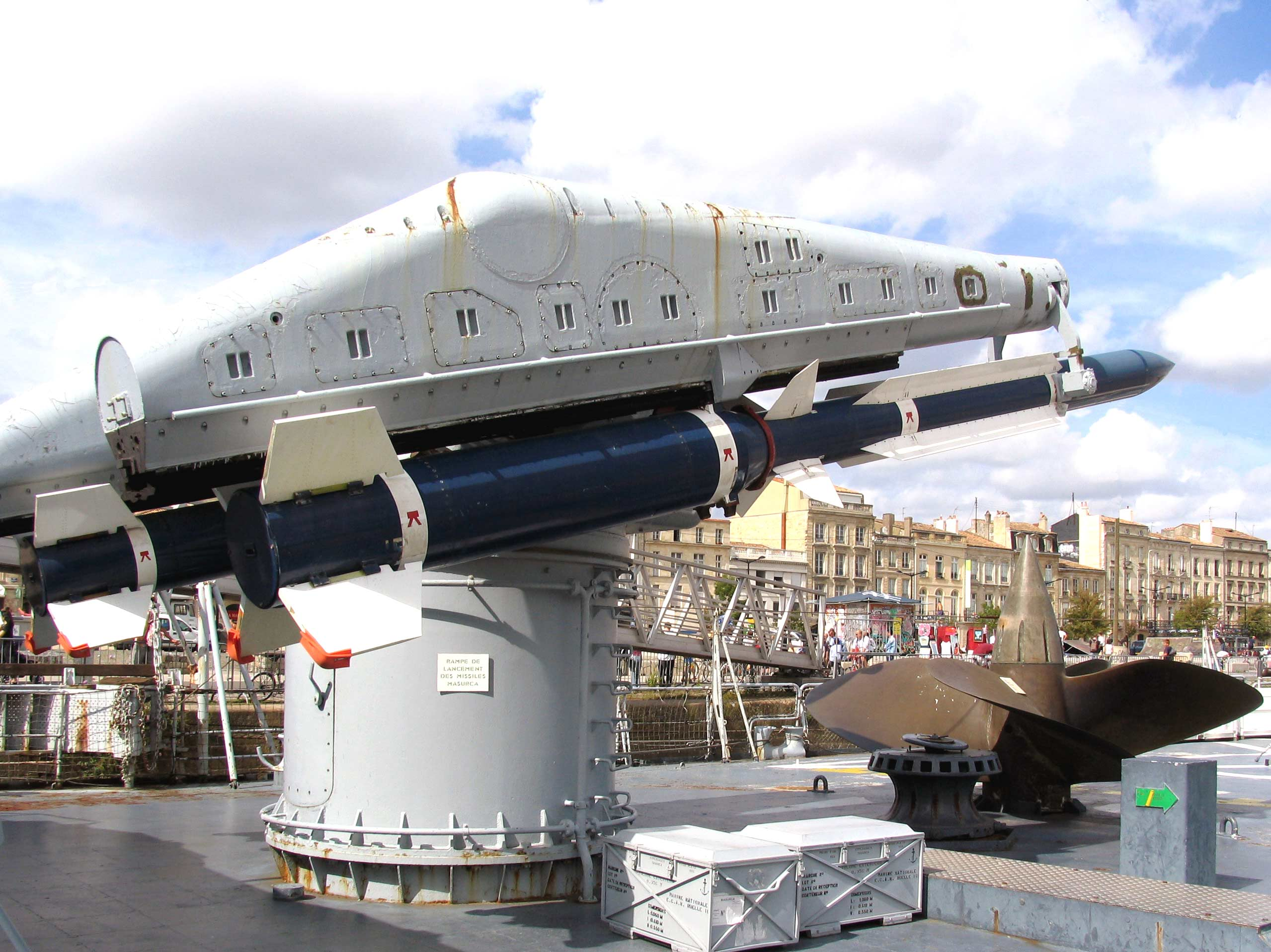
- Masurca missile on launcher
- Type: Surface-to-air missile
- Place of origin: France

Service history
- In service: 1968 to 2009
- Used by: France

Production history
- Designed: 1960
- Manufacturer: ECAN Ruelle
- Produced: 1966
- Variants: Mk1, Mk2 mod2 and Mk2 mod3

Specifications
- Mass: 950 kg (2,090 lb) + 1,148 kg (2,531 lb) booster
- Length: 5.38 m (17 ft 8 in) + 3.32 m (10 ft 11 in) booster
- Diameter: 0.406 m (1 ft 4.0 in)
- Wingspan: 0.770 m (2 ft 6.3 in)
- Warhead: 100 kg (220 lb) HE blast-fragmentation
- Detonation mechanism: Proximity fuze
- Engine: Matra solid rocket booster and sustainer
- Operational range: 55 km (34 mi)
- Flight ceiling: 20,000–30,000 m (66,000–98,000 ft)
- Maximum speed: Mach 3.0
- Guidance system: Inertial initial and Semi-active radar homing terminal
- Steering system: Control surfaces
- Launch platform: ship

The Masurca missile was a first-generation naval surface-to-air missile system developed and used by the French Navy. Planned as the primary air defence missile system of the first generation of French guided missile ships, it was used only aboard the two Suffren-class frigates and as a retrofit to the cruiser Colbert.

== History ==
In 1948 France embarked on a number of programs to develop guided missile systems, the aim being to keep pace with the other Great Powers. The proliferation of high-speed threats, be they underwater, surface or aerial threats, required the development of effective defences. High-priority programs were initiated to cover all areas: anti-aircraft, anti-surface and anti-submarine. Of these programs two achieved operational status; these were:

- MALAFON (MArine LAtécoère FONd i.e. Latécoère Naval underwater) for the anti-submarine role
- MASURCA (MArine SURface Contre-Avions i.e. Naval surface anti-aircraft) for the area and high-priority air defense role

France had already been working on an anti-aircraft missile the Maruca, derived from the wartime German Henschel Hs 117 Schmetterling. Although the MARUCA program was ultimately abandoned because of impracticability, experience from its development would not go to waste.

In 1955 ECAN de Ruelle began work on a supersonic missile using solid-propellants. The MASURCA was a DTCN (Direction Technique des Constructions Navales i.e. Naval Construction Department) program working through ECAN de Ruelle and Matra.

The first tests were made on the Île du Levant, the focus moving in 1960 to the Ile d'Oléron in a building especially built for experimentation. 50 test firings would be made in the period up to 1968, concluding with operational validation aboard the then newly commissioned frigate Suffren.

After the initial version, known as the Mark 1, came the Mark 2 which benefited from knowledge and technology transfer from the United States. France was in the process of modernising its T 47-class fleet escorts and it received data from the RIM-2 Terrier program offered by the United States as equipment for Dupetit-Thouars, and experience from the deployment of the RIM-24 Tartar aboard Kersaint, Bouvet, and Du Chayla.

France subsequently developed the Mk2 mod2 (Mark 2 modification 2) which deployed from 1966. This was later improved to MK2 mod 3 standard in 1970, and was updated again between 1983 and 1985.

MASURCA had been intended as the principal air defence weapon of France's first generation of guided-missile ships (known as FLE or frégates lance-engins in the French parlance of the time). Initially MASURCA was to have armed the six units of the Suffren class, however with the termination of the class at two ships, the only ships to ship with the system were Suffren, her sister ship Duquesne and, in her incarnation as a guided missile cruiser, the cruiser Colbert.

Over time the number of missiles has declined with the winding down of the program and the retirement of its launch platforms. Duquesne was placed into reserve in 2009 replaced by the air-defence frigate Forbin.

== System characteristics ==
=== The missile ===
The complete missile weighed over two tonnes composed of two stages joined by pyrotechnic fasteners (designed to separate the two stages when the propellant in the first had been exhausted). The missile had a range of 55 km (34 mi) and possessed a large, for an anti-aircraft weapon, 100 kg (220 lb) high explosive (HE) blast fragmentation warhead. This was perhaps to overcome shortcomings in accuracy as, coupled with a proximity fuse, any aircraft the missile failed to hit could still be caught in its blast.

The booster was designed to expend all its fuel in about 5 seconds, accelerating the missile to a velocity of 800 m/s (2,600 ft/s) on separation. After separation of the two stages, and the missile was heading towards the target at a terminal velocity of Mach 3, the terminal radar guidance system was initiated.

This mode of operation meant that the missile had a minimum intercept altitude of 30 metres (98 ft) which in theory left it unable to intercept sea skimming anti-ship missiles and low flying aircraft. However even blind the 100 kg (220 lb) warhead meant that some result would have been achieved.

MASURCA was manufactured in three versions:

- The Mark 1: this was a basic version, it was used during all qualification tests but also for a time aboard the Suffren.
- The Mark 2 Mod 2: this was the first operational version. This relatively primitive version was retired in 1975.
- The Mark 2 Mod 3: this was the last operational version.

=== The weapon system ===
Laymen tend to think of a weapon system as consisting only of the weapon itself, in this case the missile, however with MASURCA (and for that matter most missile systems) this is far from the truth.

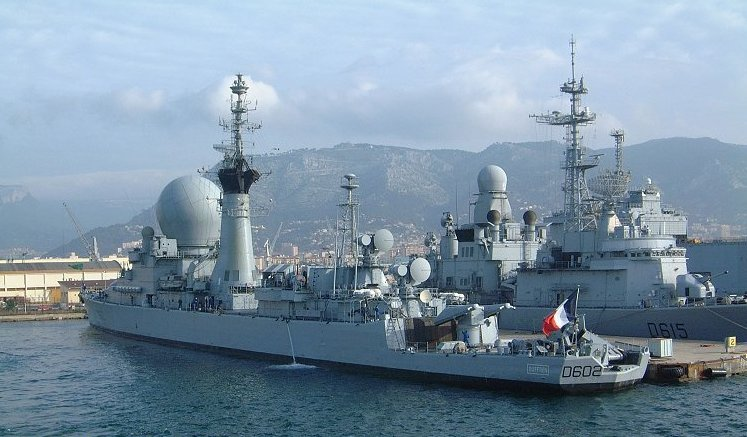
Suffren seen from aft port, to the stern is the twin armed MASURCA launcher, forward of which (in two tiers) are the fire control radars, the large radome conceals the DRBI-23 three-dimensional radar.

The MASURCA weapon system consisted of:

- A twin arm launcher of 40 t (39 long tons; 44 short tons), 4 m (4.4 yd) high and 4.45 m (4.87 yd) wide, trainable in elevation and azimuth. Providing the initial direction of the missile to the target, it could launch missiles at elevations from +6° to +70°.
- A working chamber located to the rear of the launch arms and pedestal. This chamber permitted the mounting and unfolding of the rear tail control services and facilitated the loading of the missiles onto the launch arms.
- A magazine consisting of two horizontal silos for the storage of 17 ready to fire missiles and space for a single missile to undergo verification for proper operation
- A magazine for the storage of unassembled missiles.
- A missile assembly cradle. It was difficult to assemble more than 12 missiles in a day's work, in particular ceramic components within the missiles were very susceptible to shock damage during assembly.
- Two DRBR-51 tracking radars with two associated illuminators
- Fire control Computer
- A single DRBI-23 three-dimensional radar
- A single SENIT 2 automatic tactical information processor
- Target designators for weapon assignment

Whereas the weight of 48 missiles is 96 t (94 long tons; 106 short tons), counting the entire weapon system as a whole, the weight was closer to 450 t (440 long tons; 500 short tons). This great weight imposed a limit on the minimum hull size that could deploy the system, and was one reason why MASURCA was limited to only three ships of the French Navy.

=== Operation of the mod 2 and 3, and constraints ===
MASURCA utilised semi-active radar homing for terminal guidance requiring radar illumination of the target by its parent warship. This was provided by two groups of DRBR-51 tracking and illumination radars, allowing MASURCA equipped ships to simultaneously engage two targets.

Once a target had been identified by the DRBI-23 three-dimensional radar and prioritised, the two DRBR-51 radars would be locked onto the two most dangerous targets and once they have come into range the missiles would be fired.

Missiles could be launched before targets come into range, anticipating their future position. It was also possible for more than two missiles to be launched simultaneously. Although only two could be actively controlled, the launch arms would send the following missiles in the right direction. If the first two missiles were destroyed or had missed, the following missiles could be immediately gathered in to re-attack the same target or, if the first target had been destroyed, allocated to attack another. However, at two tonnes, the MASURCA missile was not the easiest of missiles to handle, and reloading of the launch arms was relatively long, leading to a delay between the first and any subsequent salvo of missiles.

This mode of operation was common to both the service variants of the MASURCA, the mod 2 and the mod 3. The mod 2 was relatively primitive, the missile had no way of perceiving the target other than through the proximity fuse, the missile operating in effect as a command guided one, the accuracy of the missile dependent on the tracking systems ability to maintain a lock on the target which could become indistinct with increasing range, altitude and speed of the target.

The final service version, the mod 3, was a true semi-active radar homing (SARH) missile with a continuous-wave radar receiver built into the missile, which homed in on the CW radar return of the illumination radar. This CW return, reflected from the target, would be scattered in all directions however the closer the missile came to the target, the "brighter" the target would appear increasing the chance of a hit. In addition the reaction time of the missile reduced as the range to the target decreased, which was not true of the radio controlled mod 2.

== Deployment and operations ==
The MASURCA was a medium-range area defence missile, intended not just for the self-protection of the vessel it is deployed aboard but to provide air defence to accompanying vessels. MASURCA was for over thirty years, together with other systems, responsible for providing anti-aircraft and anti-missile protection for the French carrier battle groups.

The number of MASURCA ship-sets was repeatedly reduced in line with reductions in the French naval budget. The six complete systems that were initially ordered was very quickly reduced to five. Heavy and complex to introduce, MASURCA required a vessel with a minimum displacement of at least 5,000 t (4,900 long tons; 5,500 short tons), requiring more expensive ships than France at the time was willing to fund. The budget allocation for 1960-1965, adopted on 6 December 1960, therefore allowed for no more than three units of the Suffren class. However the third ship was to be finally cancelled in order to free funds for the purchase of 42 F-8 Crusader fighters to serve aboard the new carriers Clemenceau and Foch.

The third ship-set was destined for the helicopter carrier Jeanne d'Arc but was not available during her construction. This final MASURCA system was later to be installed aboard the cruiser Colbert during her 1970-1972 refit. This allowed the Marine Nationale to field a four ship squadron of RIM-24 Tartar equipped T-47 fleet escorts, in addition to three ships with, for their time, capable air defence systems, Suffren, Duquesne and Colbert.

These three ships would be used on numerous missions to provide air-defence cover for French fleets and allies in peacekeeping and military operations: Lebanon (1980–1986), Iraq (Daguet (1989), Gulf War (1990–1991), Opération Balbuzard (1993-1994, during the Siege of Sarajevo by the Serbs).

MASURCA was retired from service in 2009 without ever having been fired in anger, it was replaced in service by the Aster 30 missile aboard the Horizon-class frigates Forbin and Chevalier Paul.

== See also ==
- RIM-2 Terrier
- RIM-67 Standard
- Seaslug
- Sea Dart

== Bibliography ==
- Friedman, Norman (1989). The Naval Institute Guide to World Naval Weapons Systems. Annapolis, Maryland: Naval Institute Press. ISBN 0-87021-793-3.
- This article's content is based on the corresponding article in the French Wikipedia.
