= French cruiser Colbert (C611) =

Anti aircraft missile cruiser built for french navy

Colbert
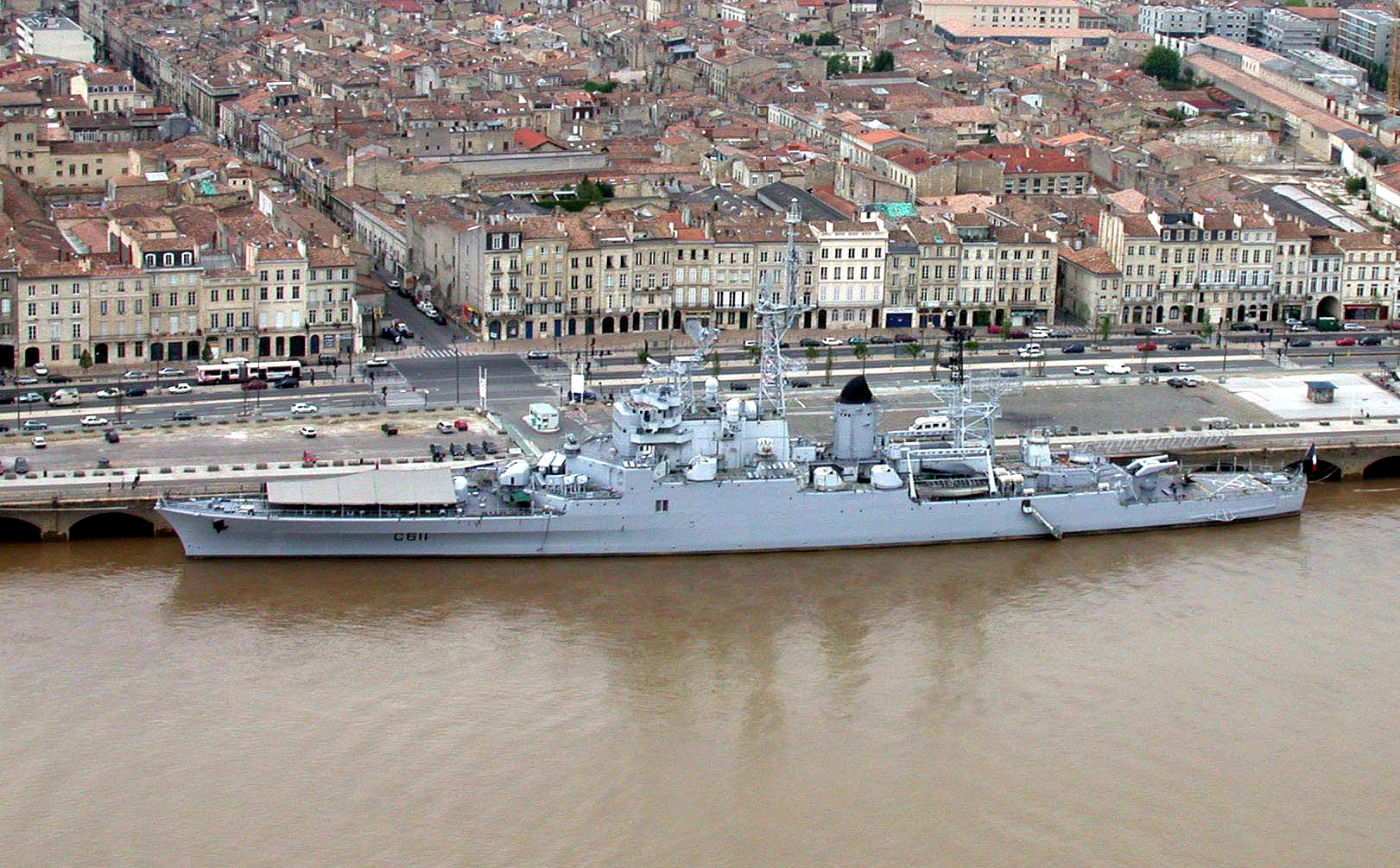
- Colbert in the port of Bordeaux in its time as a museum ship (2006)

History

France
- Name: Colbert
- Namesake: Jean-Baptiste Colbert
- Ordered: 1953
- Builder: Brest Arsenal
- Laid down: 9 June 1954
- Launched: 24 March 1956
- Commissioned: 5 May 1959
- Decommissioned: May 1991
- Home port: Brest
- Fate: Scrapped 2016

General characteristics (as built)
- Type: Cruiser
- Displacement: 9,084 t (8,941 long tons) standard, 11,587 t (11,404 long tons) full load
- Length: 180.5 m (592 ft 2 in)
- Beam: 19.7 m (64 ft 8 in) (waterline)
- Draft: 6.5 m (21 ft 4 in) (max)
- Installed power: 4 x Indret boilers
- Propulsion: Parsons geared steam turbines, 2 shafts, 86,000 PS (63,253 kW)
- Speed: 32 knots (37 mph; 59 km/h)
- Range: 7,100 nmi (13,100 km) at 18 kn (21 mph; 33 km/h)
- Complement: 977 (as flagship)
- Sensors & processing systems: Surveillance radar; DRBV 22A; DRBV 20A; DRBI 10B; DRBN 31 navigation radar; Fire control radar; 4 x DRBC 31B; 4 x DRBC 31A; DSBC 1 sonar
- Electronic warfare & decoys: ARBA 10B; ARBR 10B; ARBR 20; RRBM1&2; AN/SPR 1
- Armament: 8 × twin 127mm/54 modèle 48 AA guns; 10 × twin 57mm/60 modèle 51 AA guns
- Armour: Belt: 50–80 mm (2.0–3.1 in); Deck: 50 mm (2.0 in)

General characteristics (1972)
- Type: Guided missile cruiser
- Complement: 25 officers; 208 petty officers; 329 quartermasters and sailors; 500 men
- Armament: 1 × twin-rail Masurca Mark 2 launcher (48 missiles); 4 × MM-38 Exocet launchers (4 missiles); 2 × 100mm/55 modèle 68 AA guns; 6 × twin 57mm/60 modèle 51 AA guns; 2 × 12.7mm AA machine guns

Colbert (C 611) was an anti-air cruiser, later transformed into a missile cruiser, of the French Navy. She was the sixth ship (and second cruiser) of the French Navy to be named after Jean-Baptiste Colbert (the previous one was scuttled at Toulon in 1942). She served in the Navy from 1956 to 1991, before being converted into a museum ship at Bordeaux in 1993. Colbert was scrapped in 2016.

Colbert was the last French warship designated as a "cruiser". Afterwards, the French Navy adopted the term "frigate".

== History ==
=== Development ===
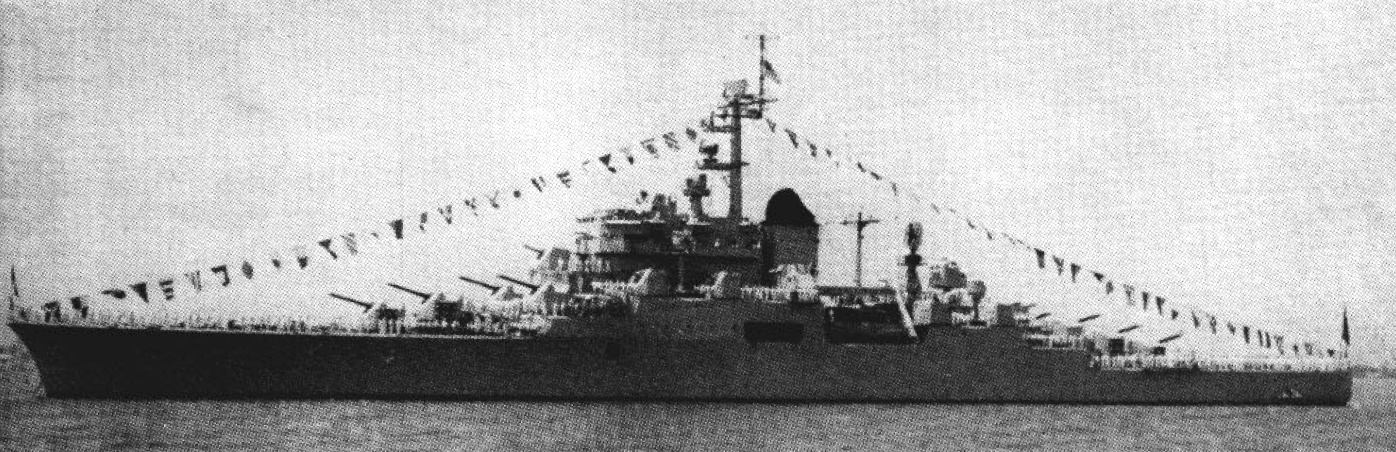
De Grasse in June 1957

In 1946 and 1947, the French Navy planned to have six conventional and six anti-air cruisers; afterward, the navy only managed to complete De Grasse and build the new Colbert, authorized in 1953 with the project designation "C53". Colbert was a purpose-designed anti-air warfare ship based on De Grasse, with a mixed armament of 127 mm and 57 mm guns. Colbert was laid down at the Brest Arsenal on 9 June 1954, launched on 24 March 1956, and entered service on 5 May 1959.

=== Early service ===
Early in her career, Colbert served as flagship of the French Mediterranean squadron (escadre de Méditerranée) at Toulon.

In 1961, she repatriated the remains of Marshal Hubert Lyautey from Morocco to France.

In late-1964, President Charles de Gaulle made official visits to South America; transportation was partially provided by Colbert.

In 1967, Colbert conveyed President de Gaulle to Canada for Expo 67. The visit was cut short after De Gaulle provoked an international incident by delivering a speech supporting Quebec separatism.

=== Post-refit ===
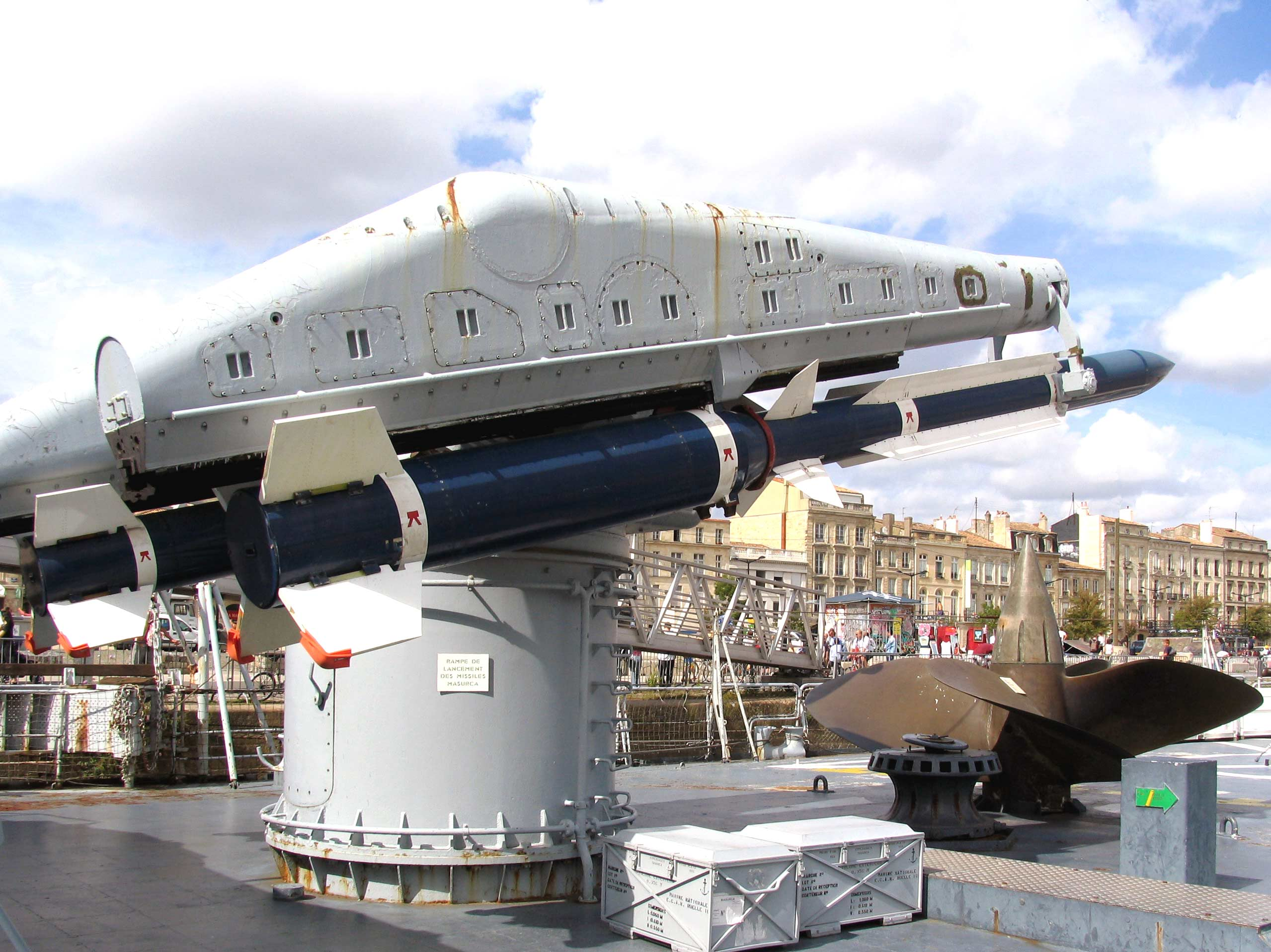
Masurca launcher.

Colbert was modernized and converted into a missile cruiser from 1970 to 1972. The 127mm guns were replaced by the Masurca surface-to-air missile system and 100mm dual-purpose guns. Afterwards, she was based at Brest from 1973 to 1976, and then at Toulon.

Colbert represented France at the bicentennial festivities in Australia in 1988.

In 1991, Colbert participated in the 1991 Gulf War (Opération Salamandre), the only time she participated in a combat operation. She was decommissioned late that year on 24 May.

=== Museum ship ===
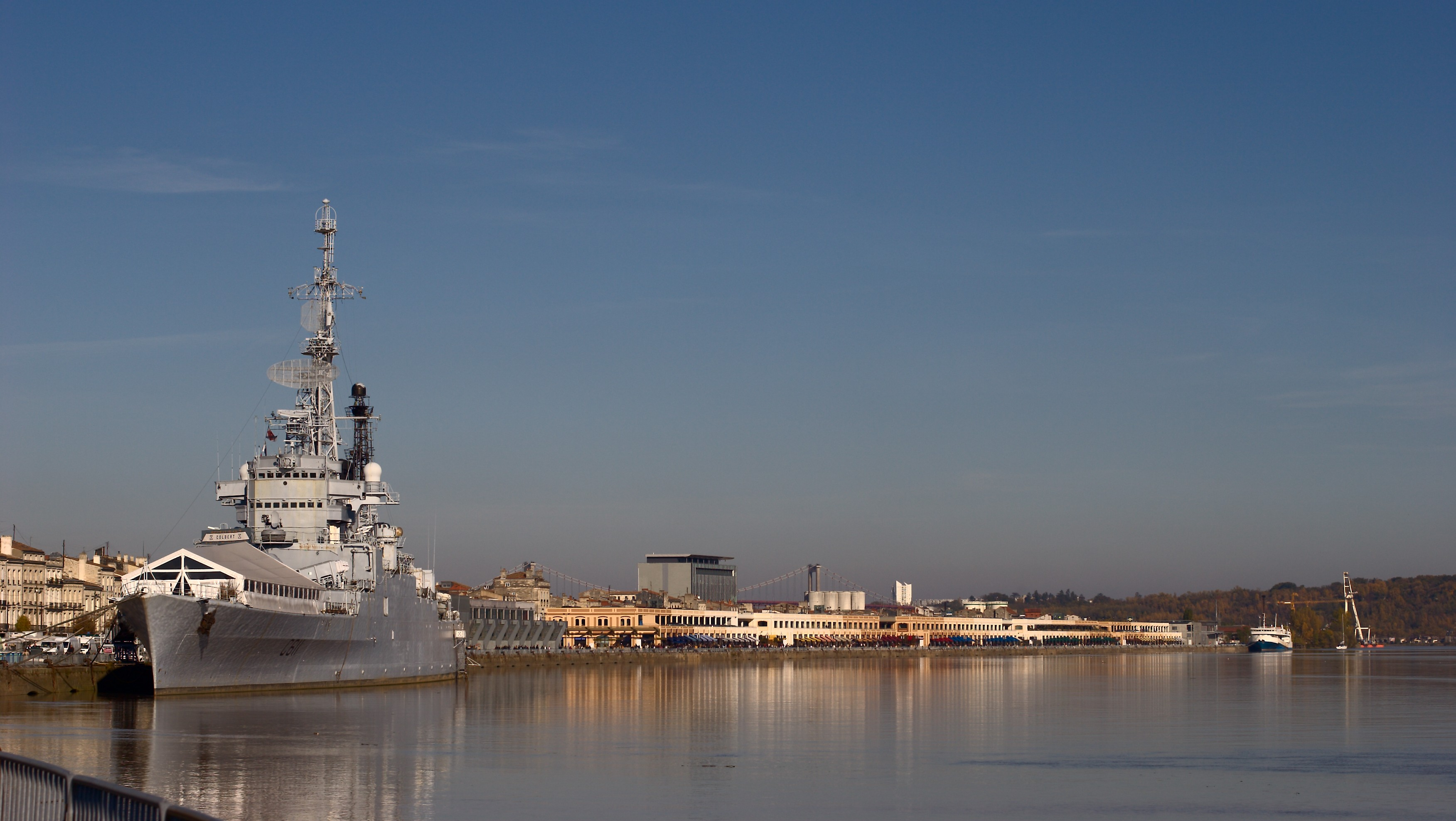
Colbert on the Garonne in Bordeaux.

Colbert was a museum and monument historique at Bordeaux from June 1993 to 2007. The ship remained owned by the state; the museum was run by the private association "The Friends of the Colbert". Guided tours provided access to areas - like the engine rooms and cabins - normally closed to the public. There were permanent exhibits on the Navy and Météo-France. Architectural models were also displayed; visitors could see modellers at work. The galley served an enclosed restaurant and dance-room built on the foredeck. The ship's siren was sounded at midday every Wednesday and Sunday.

The museum experienced chronic financial problems and could not afford the necessary security and maintenance. For example, it could not afford the €500,000 needed for repainting. The museum closed on 2 October 2006 due to a lack of funding and pressure from the municipal government and local interest groups.

=== Scrapping ===
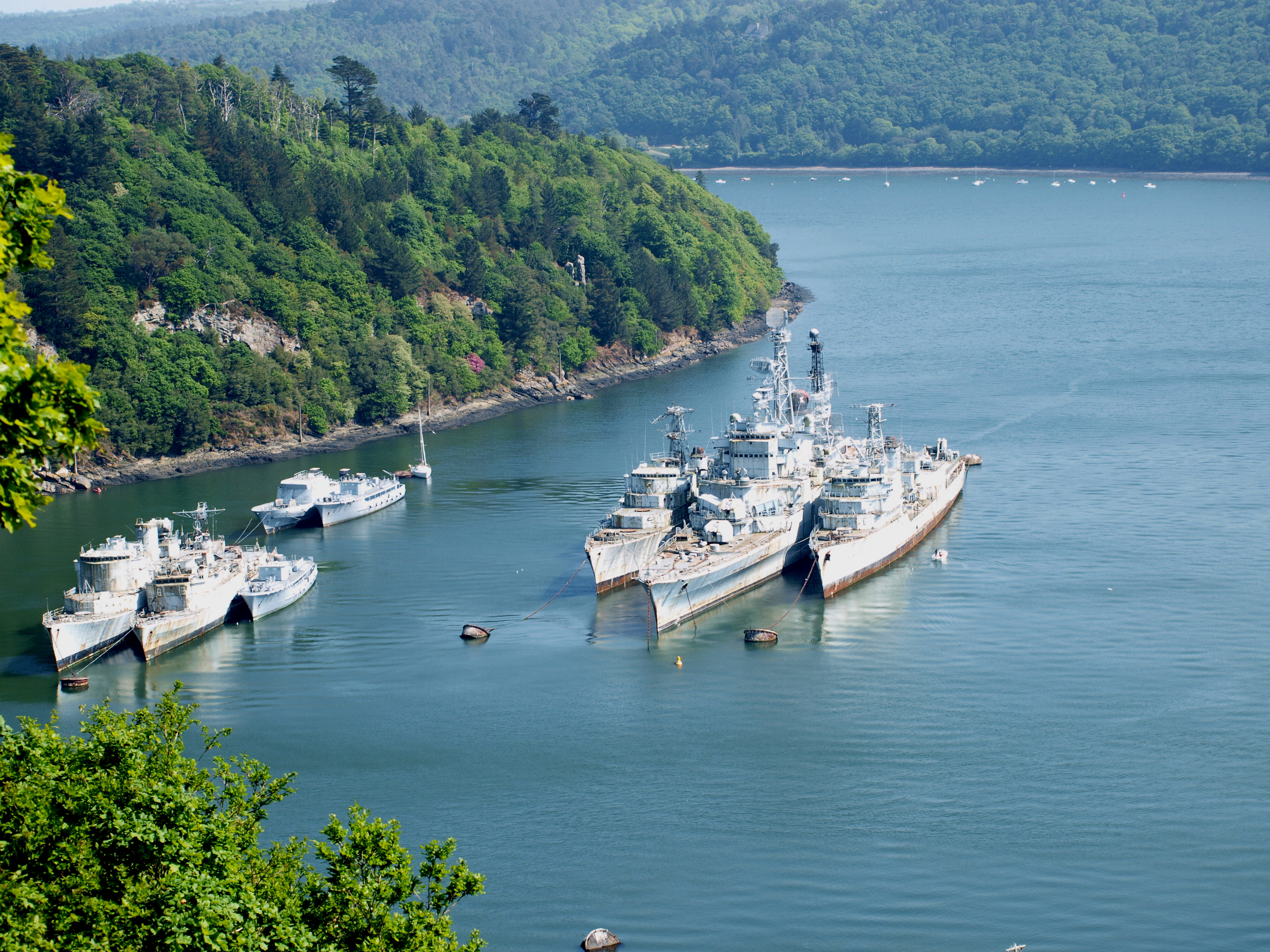
Colbert at the Landévennec graveyard

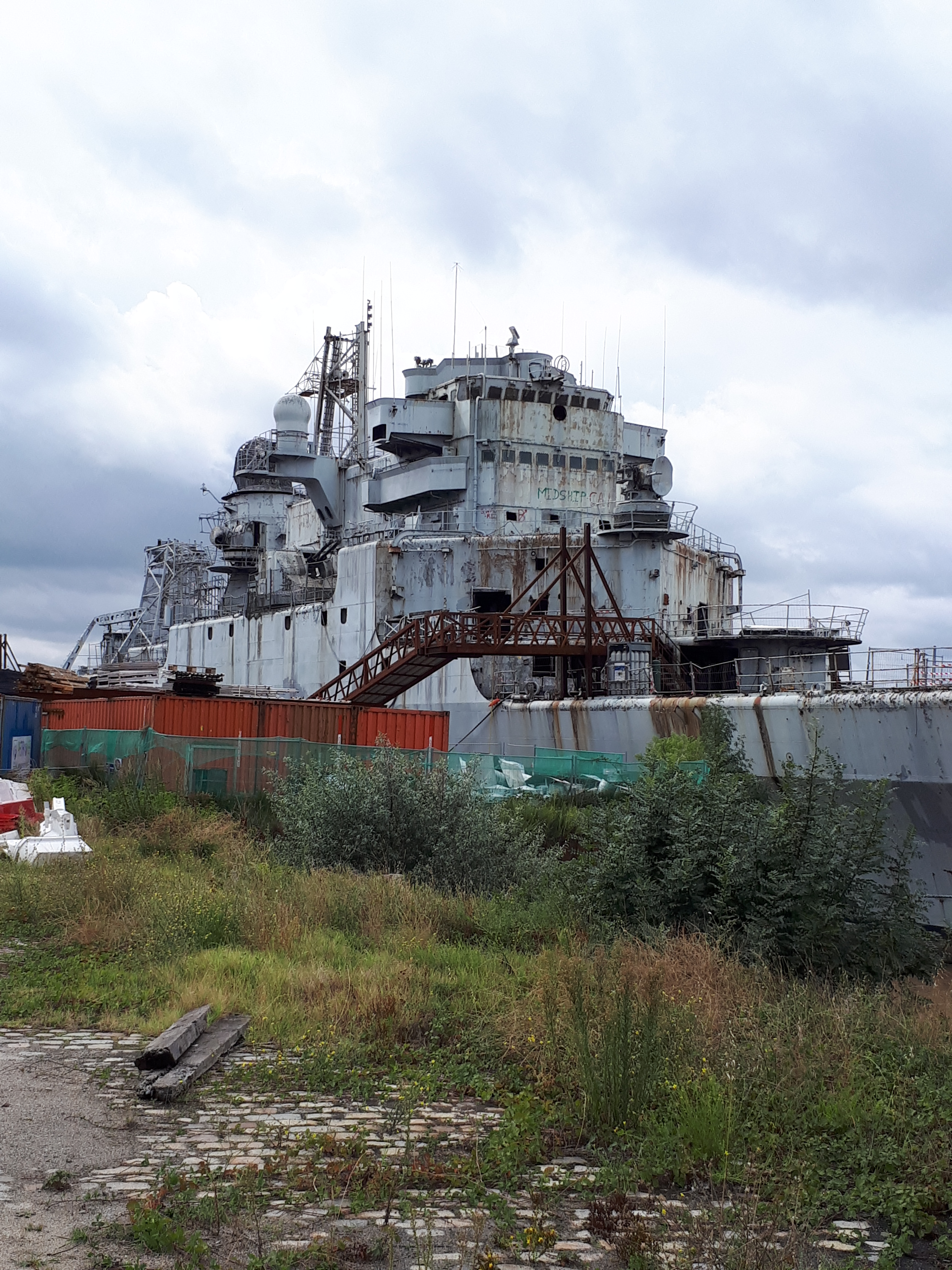
Colbert being decontaminated prior to scrapping in August 2017

On 31 May 2007, when the concession to the "Friends" expired, Colbert was towed to the mothball fleet in Landévennec. She was cannibalized for parts, mainly from the boilers and turbines, to maintain the helicopter-carrier Jeanne d'Arc; the cruiser became surplus when Jeanne d'Arc was decommissioned in September 2010. On 5 June 2016 Colbert arrived under tow at Bassens, River Gironde for scrapping.
