= List of accidents and incidents involving the Avro Shackleton =

List of plane accidents

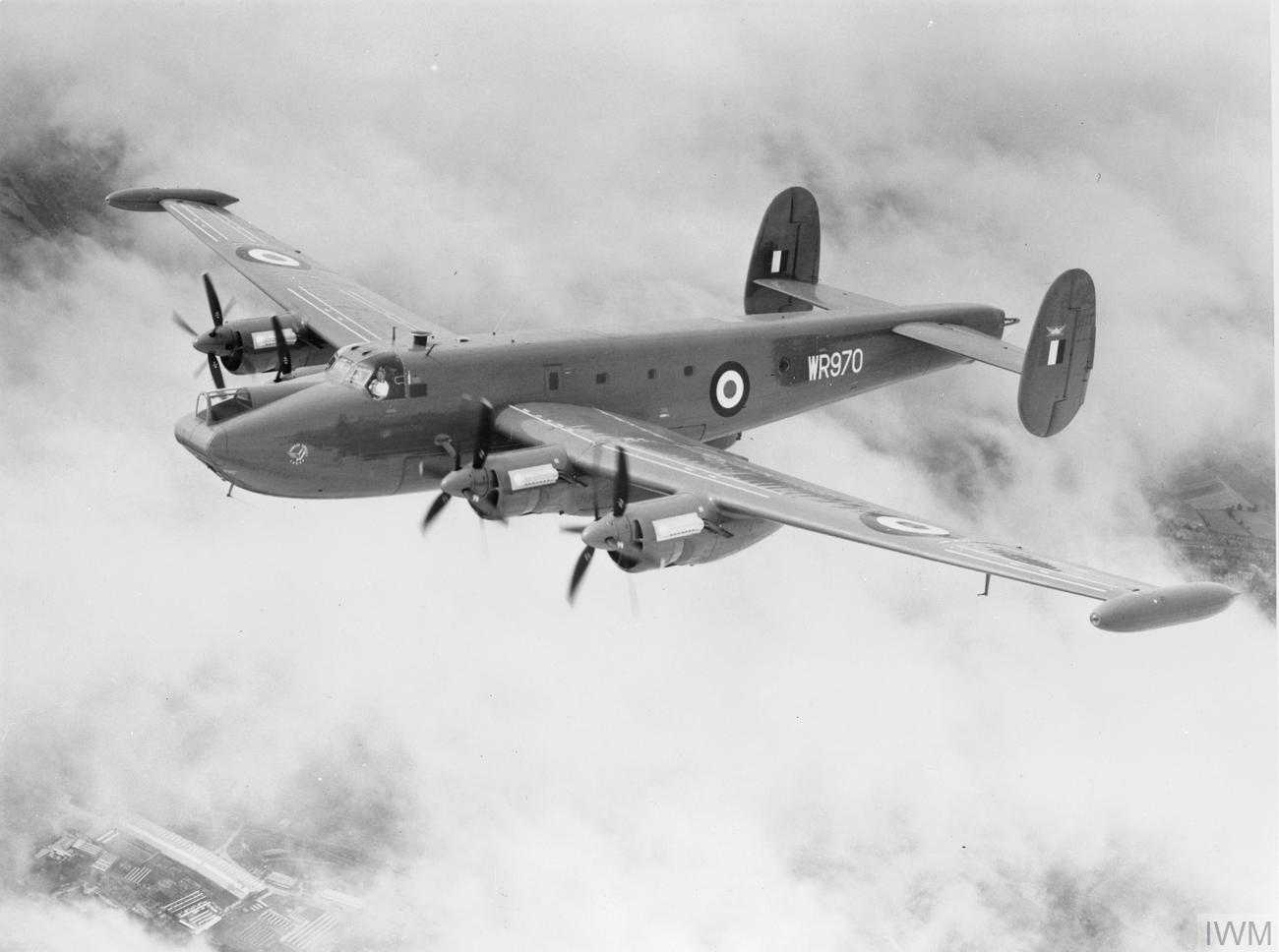
Shackleton MR.3 WR970 crashed in 1956 in Derbyshire.

List of accidents and incidents involving the Avro Shackleton four-engined maritime patrol and later airborne early warning aircraft.

== 1950s ==
- 12 August 1951 Shackleton MR.1 VP283 of No. 224 Squadron RAF crashed into the sea following loss of landing gear on final approach to RAF Gibraltar.
- 25 June 1952 Shackleton MR.1 VP261 with a crew from No. 240 Squadron RAF crashed into the sea near Berwick on Tweed. All eleven on board were killed. The aircraft was making dummy attacks on submarine HMS Sirdar when it lost height and hit the sea. The aircraft was allocated to No. 120 Squadron RAF at the time.
- 8 October 1952 Shackleton MR.1 VP286 of No. 236 Operational Conversion Unit RAF crashed into the sea off Tarbat Head, Cromarty. All 14 on board killed.
- 14 May 1953 Shackleton MR.2 WL749 on No. 120 Squadron RAF was damaged beyond repair following a port landing gear collapse during landing at RAF Aldergrove, Northern Ireland.
- 11 December 1953 Shackleton MR.2 WL746 crashed into the sea off Argyll, Scotland, all 10 on board killed.
- 12 February 1954 Shackleton MR.2 WL794 of No. 38 Squadron RAF crashed into the Mediterranean sea off Gozo, all 10 onboard killed.
- 11 January 1955 Shackleton MR.2s WG531 and WL743 of No. 42 Squadron RAF both missing believed to have collided. Eighteen aircrew missing presumed killed. The two Shackletons departed on a routine exercise off Fastnet Rock on the southwest Irish coast. The two maritime patrol aircraft took off from RAF St Eval at 10:14 and 10:20 respectively to carry out search exercises as part of their 15-hour patrol. Radio messages received from the two airplanes through 20:00 that night indicated that they were flying at the prescribed 85 mi (137 km) distance from one another, despite their having departed St. Eval with only six minutes' separation. From 20:58 all contact was lost. A three-day search was conducted, but both aircraft remained missing without a trace, leading to the assumption that there had been a mid-air collision. In 1966, the starboard outer (#4) engine of WL743 was recovered about 75 miles north of where authorities had long assumed the collision had occurred.
- 22 December 1955 Shackleton MR.2 WL799 was destroyed in a hangar fire at Langar.
- 7 December 1956 Shackleton MR.3 WR970, a trials aircraft, crashed at Foolow, Derbyshire, all four on board killed.
- 14 September 1957 Shackleton MR.2 WL792 of No. 224 Squadron RAF crashed during an air display at Gibraltar.
- 10 January 1958 Shackleton T.4 VP259 of the Maritime Operational Training Unit, RAF crashed at Heldon Hill, Elgin, both crew on board killed.
- 9 December 1958 Shackleton MR.1 VP254 of No. 205 Squadron RAF crashed into the South China Sea., all 10 on board killed. Other first hand information indicates that this aircraft may have been shot down. https://www.youtube.com/watch?v=PQdeSY33z6g

== 1960s ==
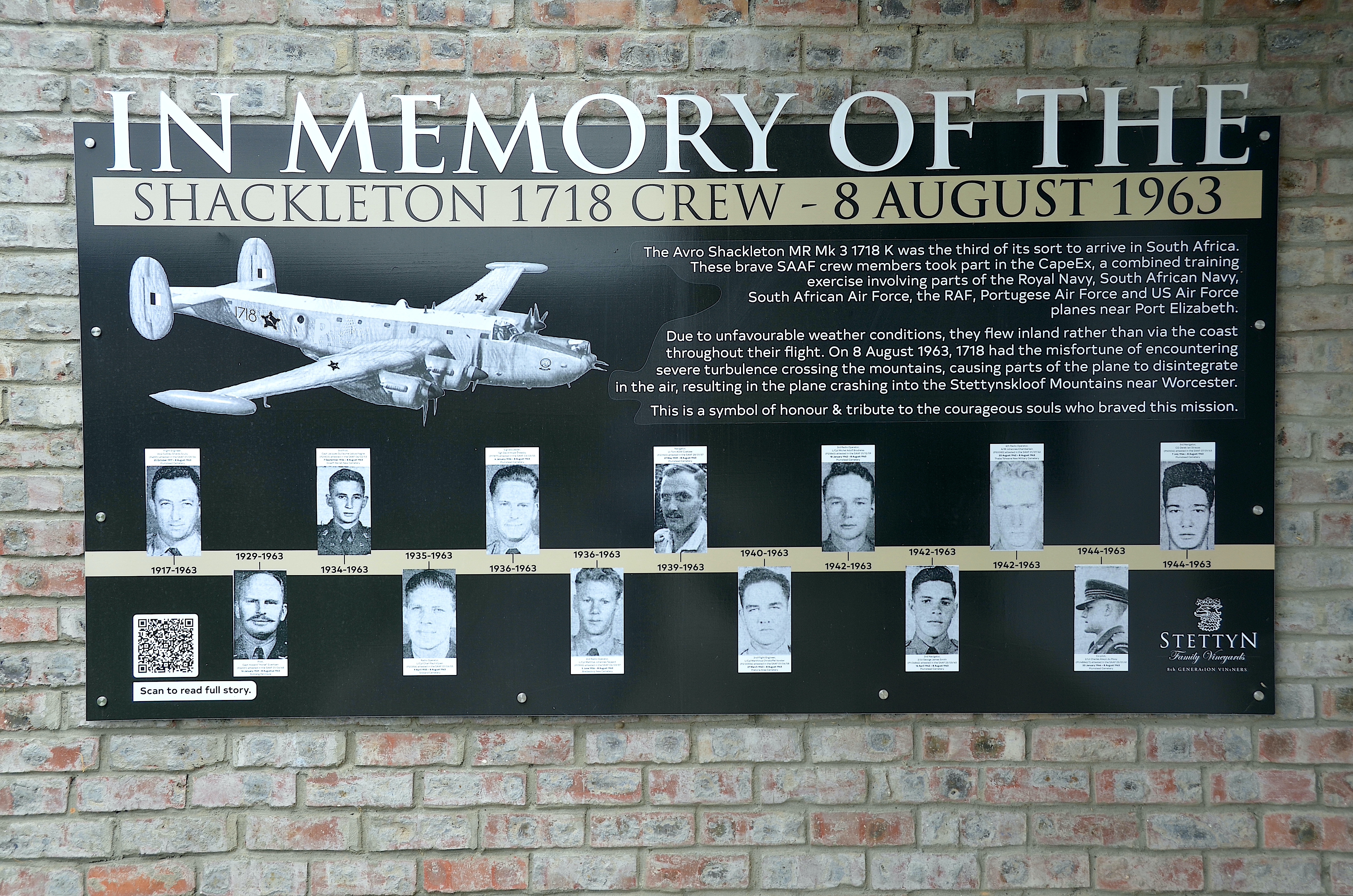
Commemorating crew of Shakleton MR.3 1718 (1963 in South Africa)

- 20 May 1961 Shackleton MR.1A WB818 had an accident on the ground at RAF Gan, it was flown to RAF Seletar and withdrawn from use.
- 20 October 1961 Shackleton MR.2 WR968 crashed at RAF Ballykelly and destroyed by fire.
- 15 May 1962 Shackleton MR.1 VP294 damaged beyond repair landing at RAF Gan.
- 8 August 1963 Shackleton MR.3 1718 of the South African Air Force crashed Wemmershoek Mountains, all 13 on board killed.
- 10 January 1964 Shackleton MR.3 XF710 crashed landed on Culloden Moor, Scotland following an engine fire. Crew all escaped and watched it burn out. Report Forres Gazette.
- 8 December 1965 Shackleton MR.3 XF704 crashed into the Moray Firth Scotland on a local training flight from RAF Kinloss, all 7 201 Sqn crew on board killed.
- 17 May 1967 Shackleton T.4 WB831 of the Maritime Operational Training Unit, RAF sank back onto runway following premature landing gear retractions on take off from RAF St. Mawgan, Cornwall.
- 5 November 1967 Shackleton MR.2 WL786 crashed into the sea 120 miles west of Lhokkruet in Indonesia, following an engine fire, eight killed, three survivors including flight engineer, one signaller and a passenger on his way to his son's wedding in Singapore.
- 19 November 1967 Shackleton MR.3 WR976 crashed into the sea off Land's End during a low-level anti-submarine exercise, nine killed, two survivors (Note: (edit 2013... 2 survivors of a crew of 11 (norm 10 but additionally included RN Lt Cdr during sub S&D training)Jamison research. Shackleton crash 18 Nov 1967))
- 21 December 1967 Shackleton MR.3 XF702 crashed at Creag Bhan, Inverness, Scotland.
- 1 April 1968 Shackleton Mk 2 WR956 skidded off the runway in wet weather whilst landing at RAF Ballykelly and was written off.
- 19 April 1968 Shackleton T.2 prototype WB833 of No. 204 Squadron RAF crashed into rising ground on the Mull of Kintyre, Scotland in bad weather, all 11 on board killed

== 1990s ==
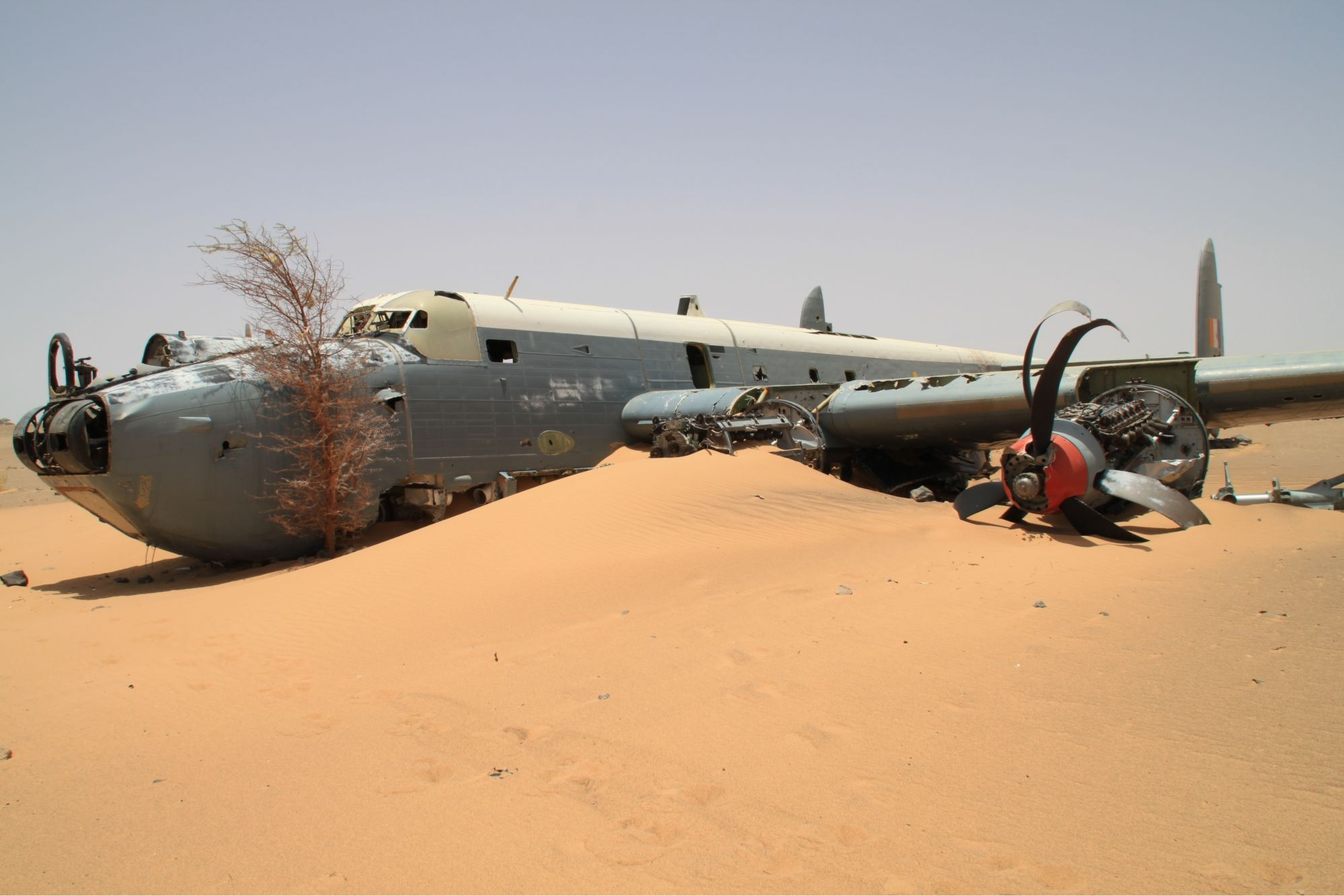
1716's crash site in Moroccan Sahara, 2010

- 30 April 1990 Shackleton AEW.2 WR965 of No. 8 Squadron RAF crashed in the Outer Hebrides. The aircraft hit a hill on the Isle of Harris in bad weather, all ten on board killed.
- 13 July 1994 Shackleton MR.3 1716 (ex South African Air Force) landed in the Sahara after double engine failure while en route to the United Kingdom.
