= Avro Shackleton =

British long-range maritime patrol aircraft

Shackleton
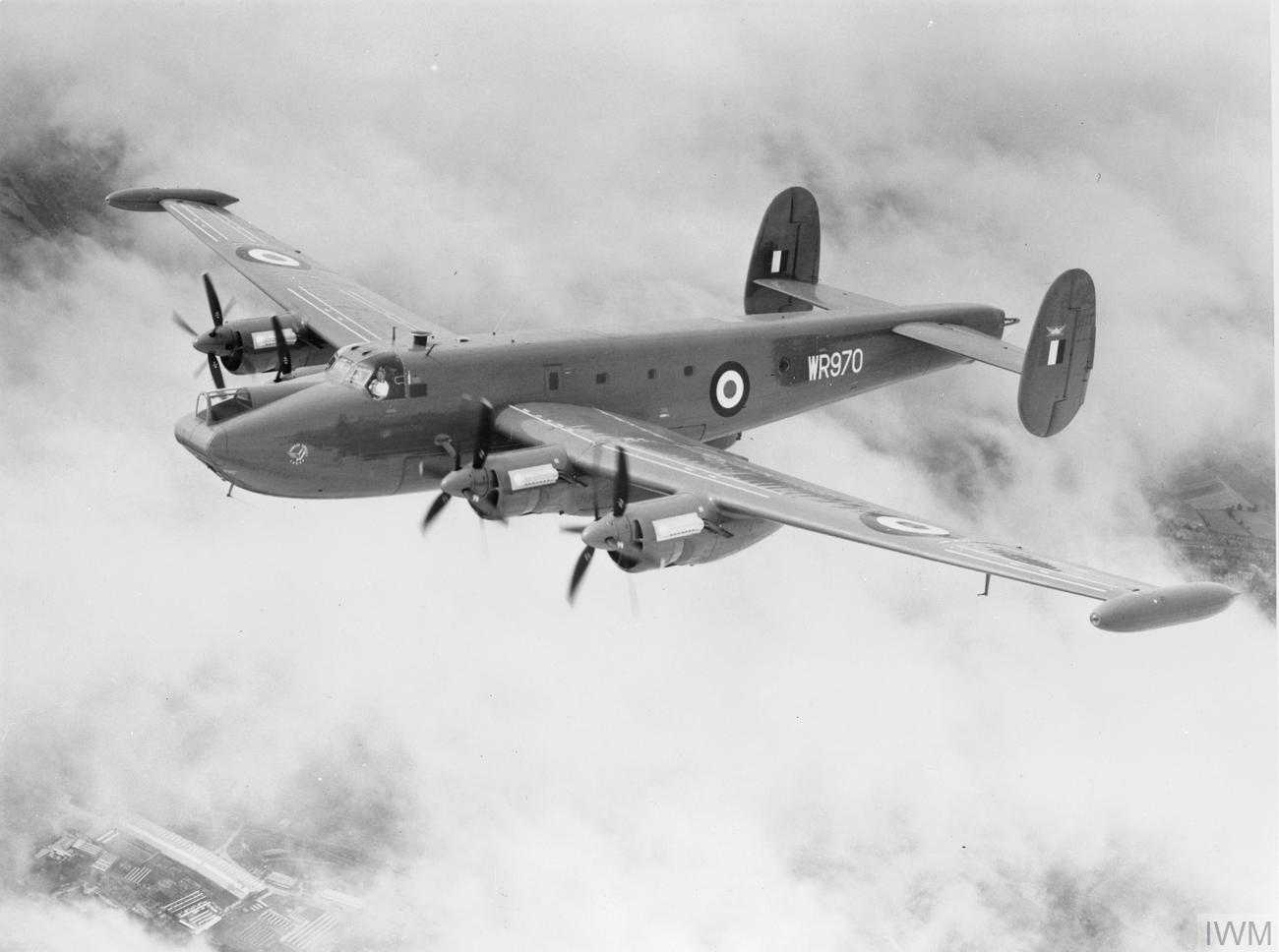
- Avro Shackleton MR3, in 1955

General information
- Type: Maritime patrol aircraft
- National origin: United Kingdom
- Manufacturer: Avro
- Primary users: Royal Air Force South African Air Force
- Number built: 185

History
- Manufactured: 1951–1958
- Introduction date: April 1951
- First flight: 9 March 1949
- Retired: 1991
- Developed from: Avro Lincoln

The Avro Shackleton is a British long-range maritime patrol aircraft (MPA) which was used by the Royal Air Force (RAF) and the South African Air Force (SAAF). It was developed by Avro from their Lincoln bomber, which itself had been a development of the famous wartime Lancaster bomber.

The Shackleton was developed during the late 1940s as part of Britain's military response to the rapid expansion of the Soviet Navy, in particular its submarine force. Produced as the primary type equipping RAF Coastal Command, the Type 696 as it was initially designated, incorporated major elements of the Lincoln, as well as the Avro Tudor airliner, and was furnished with an extensive electronics suite in order to perform the anti-submarine warfare (ASW) mission, along with much-improved crew facilities due to the long mission times involved in patrol work. The type was named Shackleton, after the polar explorer Sir Ernest Shackleton. (Note: The name of the aircraft came about due to the influence of Roy Chadwick, Chief Designer at Avro, who had initially worked alongside, and later became a close friend, of Ernest Shackleton. The name was also in line with an Air Ministry policy of naming new general reconnaissance aircraft after explorers.)

The Shackleton entered operational service with the RAF in April 1951 and was used primarily in the ASW and MPA roles, but it was also frequently deployed as an aerial search and rescue (SAR) platform and for performing several other secondary roles such as mail delivery and as an ad-hoc cargo and troop-transport aircraft. In addition to its service with the RAF, South Africa also procured the Shackleton to equip the SAAF. In South African service, the type was operated in the maritime patrol capacity between 1957 and 1984. During March 1971, a number of SAAF Shackletons were used during the SS Wafra oil spill, intentionally sinking the stricken oil tanker using depth charges to prevent further ecological contamination.

During the 1970s, the Shackleton was replaced in the maritime patrol role by the jet-powered Hawker Siddeley Nimrod, however a small number of the RAF's existing Shackletons received extensive modifications in order to adapt them to perform the airborne early warning (AEW) role. The type continued to be used in this role until 1991, when it was replaced by the Boeing E-3 Sentry AEW aircraft. These were the last examples of the type remaining in active service.

== Development ==
=== Origins ===
The Battle of the Atlantic was a crucial element of the Second World War, in which Britain sought to protect its shipping from the German U-boat threat. The development of increasingly capable diesel-electric submarines had been rapid, and in particular the snorkel virtually eliminated the need for submarines to surface while on patrol. Aircraft that had once been highly effective submarine-killers had very quickly become incapable in the face of these advances. In addition, lend-leased aircraft such as the Consolidated B-24 Liberator had been returned following the end of hostilities. Several Avro Lancasters had undergone rapid conversion (designated Maritime Reconnaissance Mk 3 (MR3)) as a stopgap measure for maritime search and rescue and general reconnaissance duties; however, RAF Coastal Command had diminished to only a third of its size immediately after the Second World War.

In the emerging climate of the Cold War, and the requirement to guard the North Atlantic from an anticipated rapid expansion of the Soviet Navy's submarine force, a new aerial platform to perform the anti-submarine mission was required. Work had begun on the requirement for a new maritime patrol aircraft in 1944, at which point there had been an emphasis on long-range platforms for Far East operations. However, with the early end of the war in the Pacific, the requirement was refined considerably. In late 1945, the Air Staff had expressed interest in a conversion of the Avro Lincoln as a general reconnaissance and air/sea rescue aircraft, formalising their requirements for such an aircraft under Air Ministry specification R.5/46. Avro's Chief Designer Roy Chadwick initially led the effort to build an aircraft to this requirement, designated as the Avro Type 696.

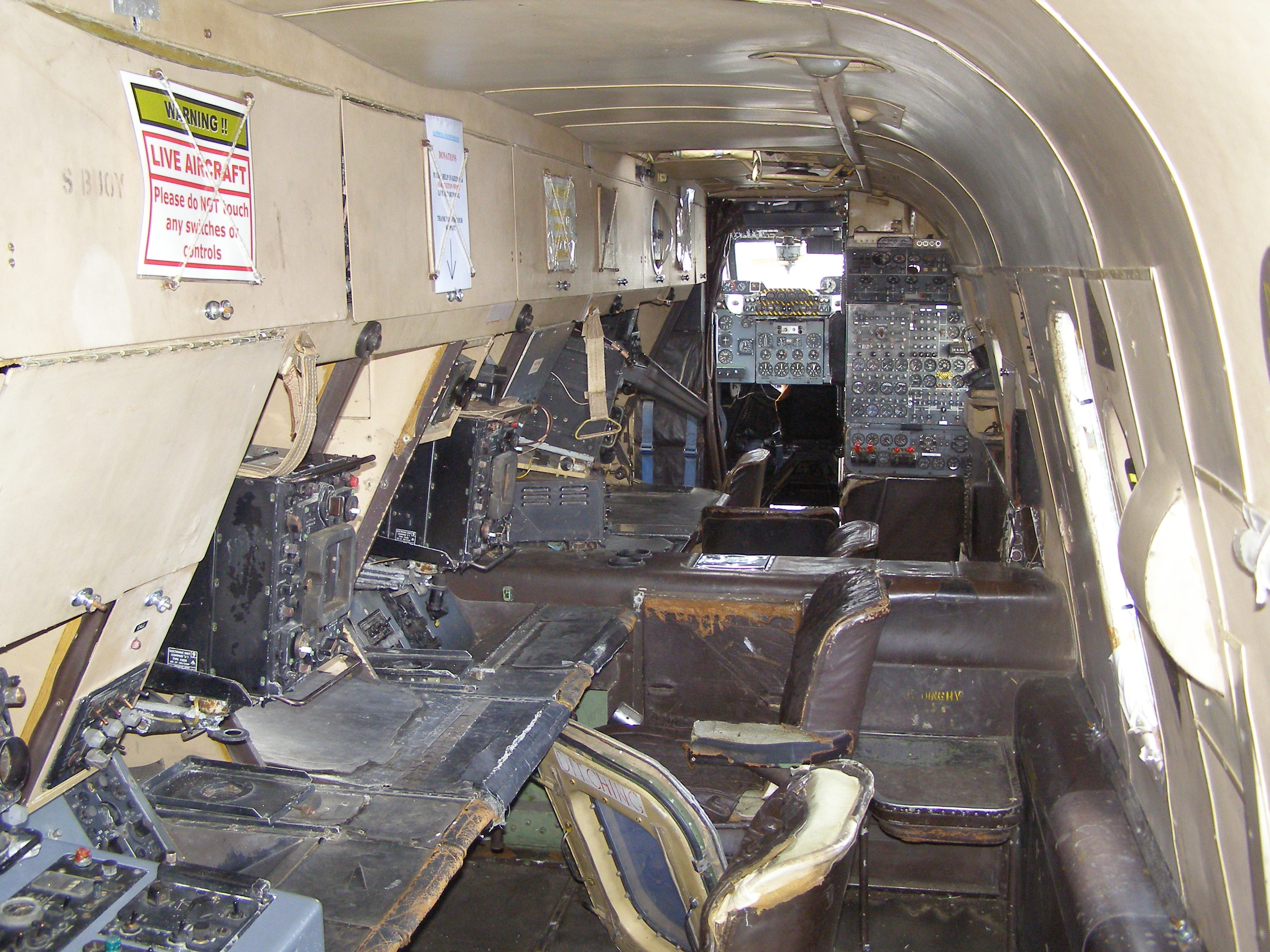
Interior of a Shackleton MR.3

The Type 696 was a significant development of the Lincoln. Elements of the Avro Tudor airliner were also reused in the design, both the Lincoln and the Tudor being derivatives of the successful wartime Lancaster bomber. Crucially, the new aircraft was to be capable of a 3,000-nautical-mile (3,500 mi; 5,600 km) range while carrying up to 6,000 pounds (2,700 kg) of weapons and equipment. In addition to featuring a large amount of electronic equipment, the Type 696 provided a much-improved crew environment compared to other aircraft types, to allow the crew to be more effective during the anticipated lengthy mission times. During development the Type 696 was provisionally referred to as the Lincoln ASR.3 before the official name 'Shackleton' was selected.

The first test flight of the prototype Shackleton GR.1, serial VW135, was made on 9 March 1949 from the manufacturer's airfield at Woodford, Cheshire in the hands of Avro's Chief Test Pilot J.H. "Jimmy" Orrell. The GR.1 was later redesignated "Maritime Reconnaissance Mark I" (MR 1). The prototype differed from subsequent production Shackletons in a number of areas, featuring several gun turrets and was equipped for air-to-air refuelling using the looped-line method. These did not feature on production aircraft due to performance difficulties or being judged ineffective. However, the performance of the prototype had been such that in addition to the go-ahead for the MR1's production, a specification for an improved variant was issued in December 1949, before the first production Shackleton had even flown. By 1951, the MR1 had become officially considered as an interim type due to several shortcomings.

=== Further development ===
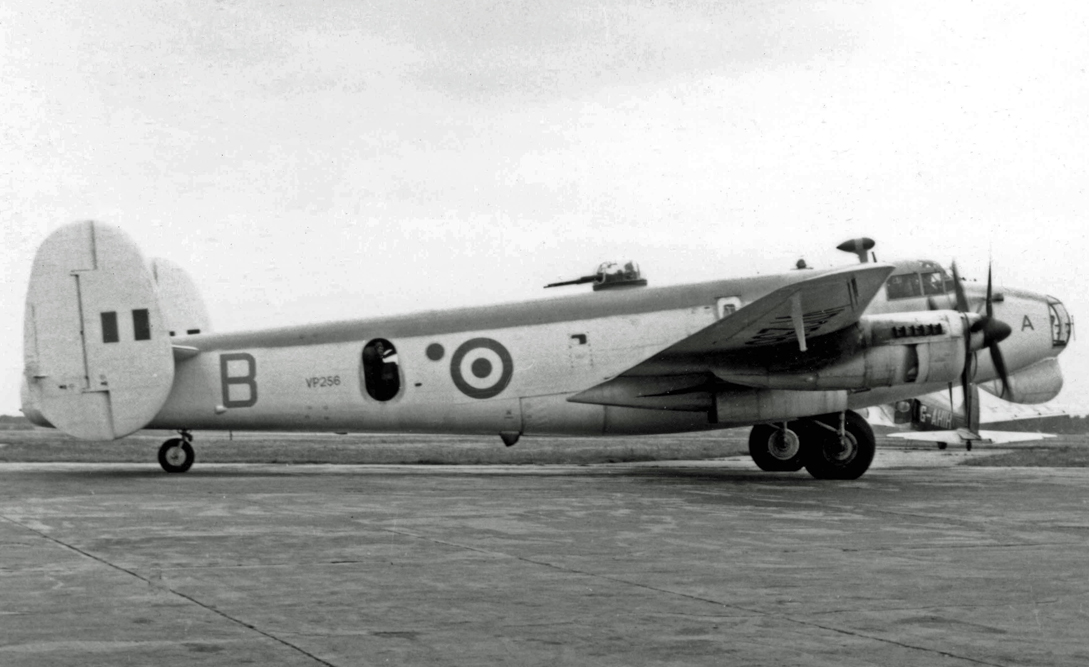
Shackleton MR.1 of 269 Squadron with dorsal turret in 1953

The MR 2 was an improved version of the Shackleton, featuring numerous refinements that had been proposed for the MR1. The radar was upgraded to ASV Mk 13, and the radome relocated from the aircraft's nose to a ventral position aft of the bomb bay, the radome was retractable and could be fully extended only with the bomb bay doors open. It had improved all round radar coverage and minimised the risk of bird strikes. Both the nose and tail section were lengthened, the tailplane was redesigned, the undercarriage was strengthened and twin-retractable tailwheels were fitted. The Bristol dorsal turret was initially retained, but was later removed from all aircraft after delivery. The prototype, VW126, was modified as an aerodynamic prototype at the end of 1950 and first flew with the MR 2 modification on 19 July 1951.

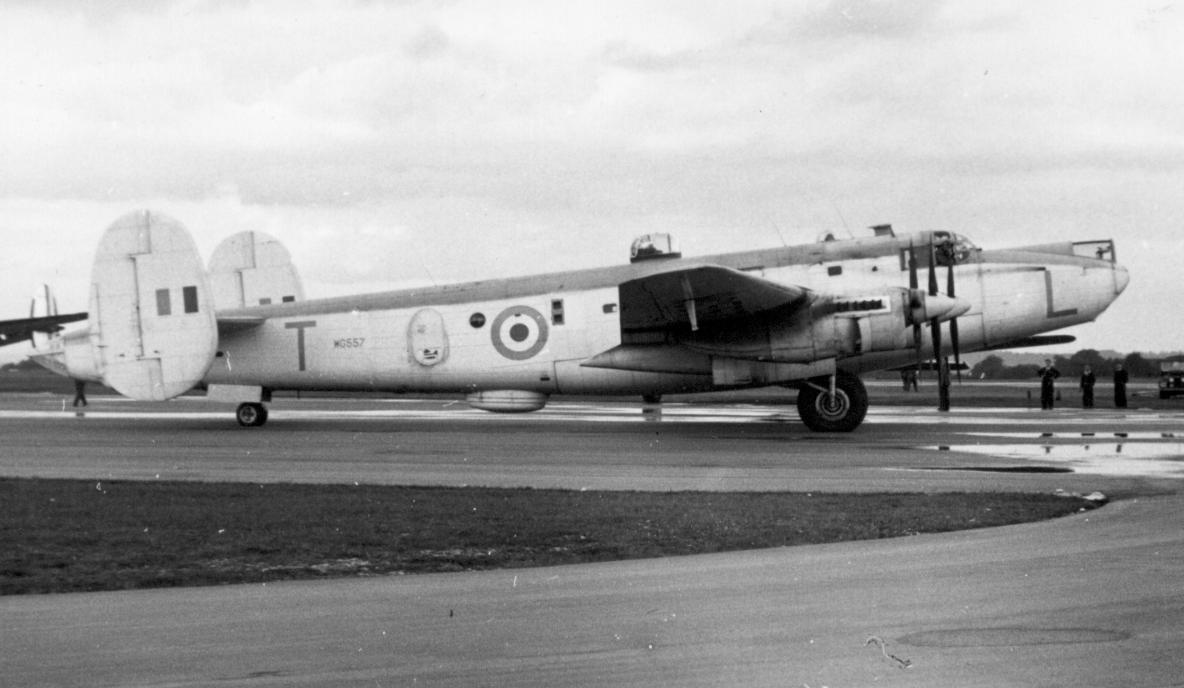
Shackleton MR.2 of No. 220 Squadron RAF in September 1955

VW126 was tested at Boscombe Down in August 1951, particular attention being paid to changes made to improve its ground handling, such as the addition of toebrakes and a lockable rudder system. One production Mk 1 aircraft was modified on the line at Woodford with the Mk 2 changes and first flew on 17 June 1952. After the trials were successful, it was decided to complete the last ten aircraft being built under the Mk 1 contract to MR 2 standard and further orders were placed for new aircraft. In order to keep pace with changing submarine threats, the Mk 2 force was progressively upgraded, with Phase I, II and III modifications introducing improved radar, weapons and other systems, as well as structural work to increase fatigue life. Production of the MR 2 ended in May 1954.

The Type 716 Shackleton MR 3 was another redesign in response to crew feedback and observations. A new tricycle undercarriage was introduced, the fuselage was increased in all main dimensions and had new wings with better ailerons and tip tanks. The weapons capability was also upgraded to include homing torpedoes and Mk 101 Lulu nuclear depth bombs. To reduce crew fatigue on 15-hour flights, the sound deadening was improved and a proper galley and sleeping space were included. Due to these upgrades, the takeoff weight of the RAF's MR 3s had risen by over 30,000 lb (13,600 kg) (Ph. III) and assistance from Armstrong Siddeley Viper Mk 203 turbojets was needed on takeoff with a 5-minute limit. The Griffons had to be run at high power for very long periods after a heavyweight take-off so the Vipers were later cleared to run for four hours continuously so lower Griffon power settings could be used which reduced the risk of failures. The extra strain took a toll on the airframe, and flight life of the RAF MR 3s was so reduced that they were outlived by the MR 2s. Due to the arms embargo against South Africa, the SAAF's MR 3s never received these upgrades but were maintained independently by the SAAF.

The Type 719 Shackleton IV, later known as the MR 4, was a projected variant intended to meet a Canadian requirement for a long-range patrol aircraft. The MR 4 would have been practically a new aircraft, sharing only the nose, cockpit, and outer wings with earlier variants; it would have also been powered by the Napier Nomad compound engine. The Shackleton IV was cancelled in 1955, the Canadian requirement being subsequently met by the Britannia Maritime Reconnaissance, based on the Bristol Britannia airliner, later entering production as the Canadair Argus.

In 1967, ten MR 2s were modified as training aircraft to replace the T 4 in-service with the Maritime Operational Training Unit. Known as T 2s, the crew rest areas were replaced by additional radar equipment and the original radar fittings removed.

== Design ==
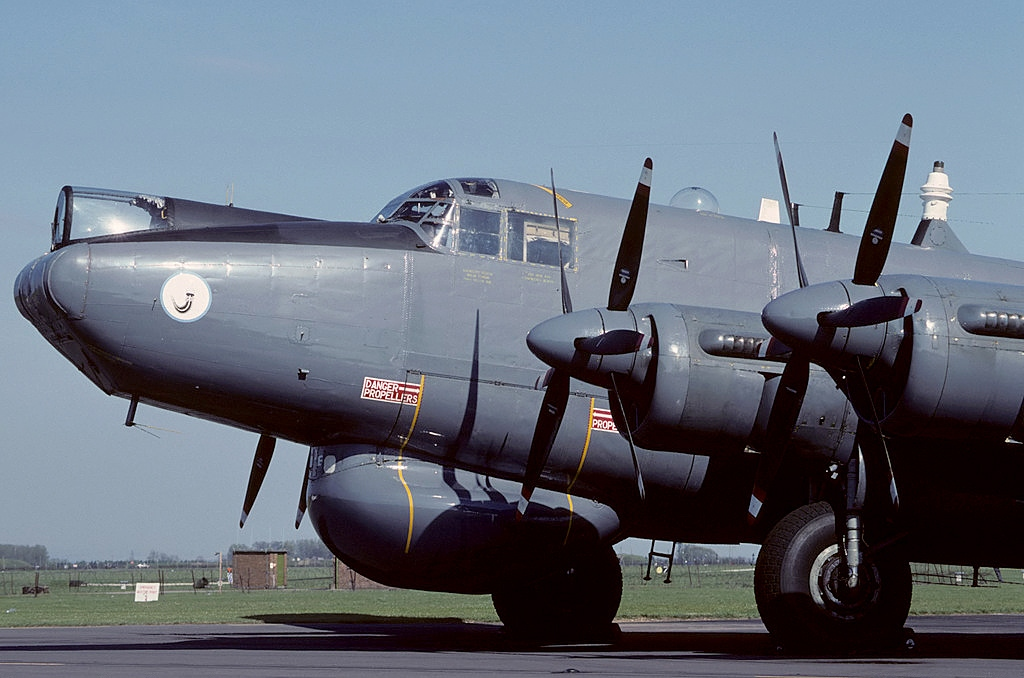
Front of a Shackleton AEW2. Note the contra-rotating propellers

The Shackleton was a purpose-built aircraft for the maritime patrol role; however, the legacy of Avro's preceding aircraft is present in many aspects of the overall design. The centre section of the Shackleton's wing originates from the Lincoln, while the outer wing and undercarriage were sourced from the Tudor. At one stage during development the tailplane had closely resembled the Lincoln's but was enlarged and changed soon after. An entirely new fuselage was adopted, being wider and deeper to provide a large space in which to accommodate the crew, their equipment, and a large bomb bay. Later variants of the Shackleton were substantially redesigned, adopting a nosewheel undercarriage, redesigned wings and centre-section, and a larger fuel capacity for more range.

Various armaments and equipment were carried by the Shackleton in order to perform its missions. In ASW operations, the ASV Mk 13 radar was the primary detection tool. It could detect a destroyer at a range of 40 nautical miles (46 mi; 74 km), a surfaced submarine at 20 nautical miles (23 mi; 37 km), and a submarine's conning tower at 8 nautical miles (9.2 mi; 15 km), although rough seas considerably reduced the radar's effectiveness. Other equipment included droppable sonobuoys, electronic warfare support measures and an Autolycus diesel fume detection system. A special camera bay housed several reconnaissance cameras capable of medium altitude and nighttime vertical photography and low-altitude oblique photography. The crew would also perform visual searches using various lookout positions that were provided for this purpose. Weapons carried included up to nine bombs, three homing torpedoes or depth-charges. The aircraft also had two 20 mm cannon in a Bristol dorsal turret. An in-flight refueling receptacle could be accommodated, but was not fitted on production aircraft.

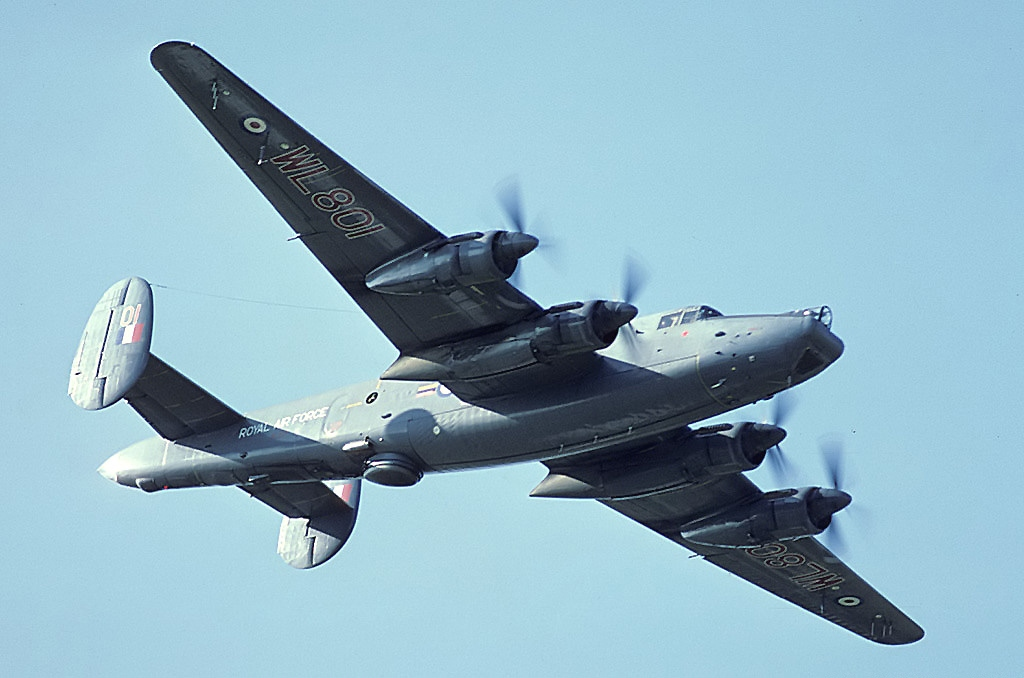
An RAF Shackleton in flight, 1978

The Merlin engines were replaced with the larger, more powerful and slower-revving Rolls-Royce Griffons with 13-foot-diameter (4.0 m) contra-rotating propellers. This engine's distinctive noise often caused crew members to develop high-tone deafness. The Griffon was needed because the Shackleton was heavier and had more drag than the Lincoln. The Griffon provided equivalent power to the Merlin but at lower engine speed, which led to reduced fuel consumption in the denser air at low altitudes; the Shackleton would often loiter for several hours at roughly 500 ft (150 m) or lower when searching for submarines. Lower-revving Griffons, compared to Merlins, reduced engine stress which improved their reliability. Using conventional propellers would have needed an increase in propeller diameter to absorb the engine's power and torque, but this was not possible due to space limitations imposed by the undercarriage length and engine nacelle positioning, so the contra-rotating propellers were adopted, which gave greater blade area within the same propeller diameter.

Numerous problems were encountered during the Shackleton's operational service. In practice, the diesel fume detection system was prone to false alarms and thus received little operational use. The engines, hydraulics and elements of the avionics were known for their unreliability, and the aircraft proved to be fairly maintenance-intensive. The prototype MR 3 was lost due to poor stalling characteristics. This was rectified prior to production, although a satisfactory stall-warning device was not installed until 1969. The Shackleton is often incorrectly assigned the unfortunate distinction of holding the record for the highest number of aircrew killed in one type in peacetime in the RAF. However the true figures suggest that some of its contemporaries fared far worse, for example the Gloster Meteor with over 430 fatalities against the Shackleton's 156. Several programs to support and extend the fatigue life of the Shackleton's airframe were required; the fatigue life problems ultimately necessitated the rapid introduction of a whole new maritime patrol aircraft in the form of the Hawker Siddeley Nimrod, which began being introduced to RAF service in 1969.

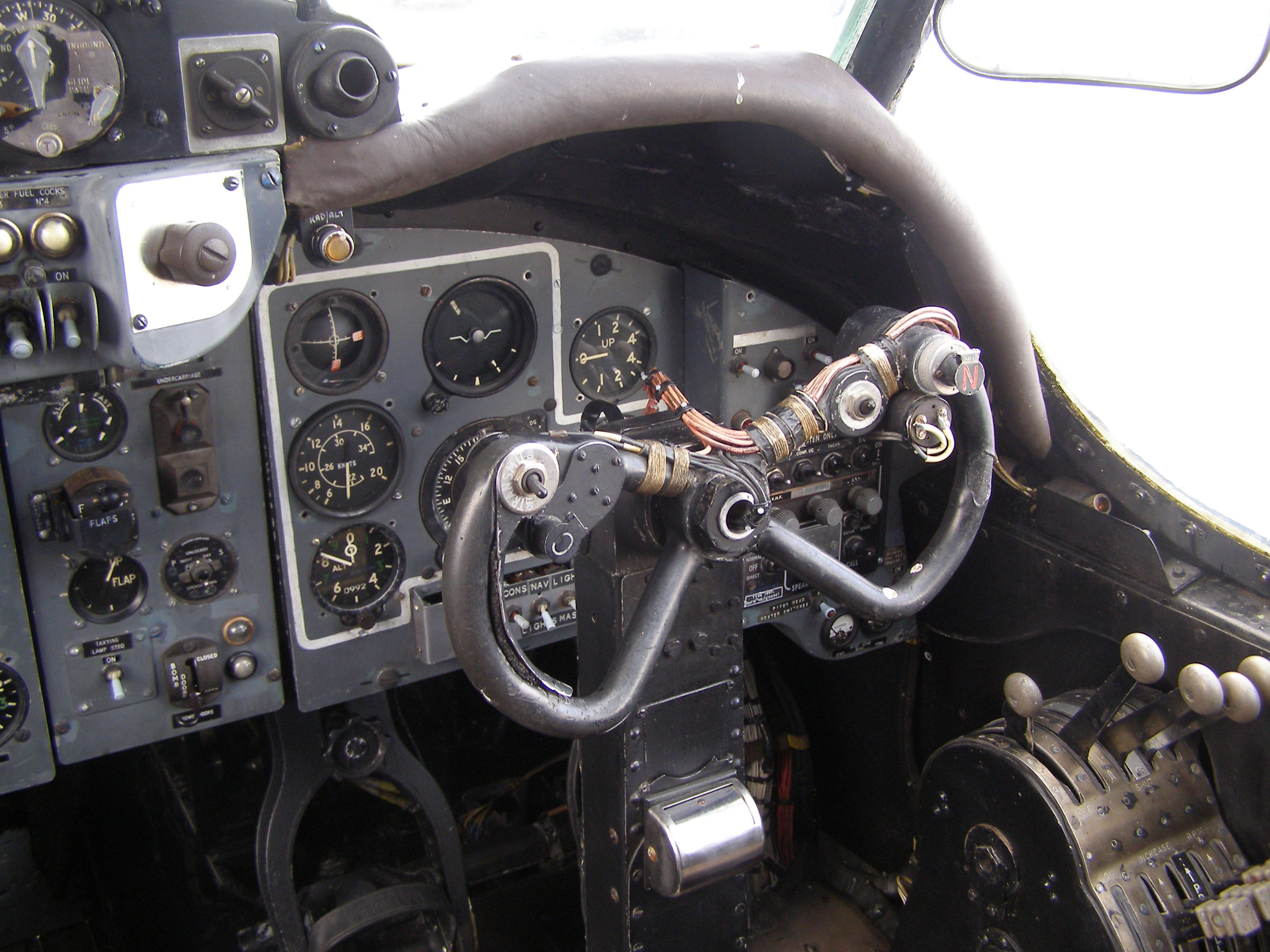
MR3 Co-pilot position

== Operational history ==
=== Royal Air Force ===
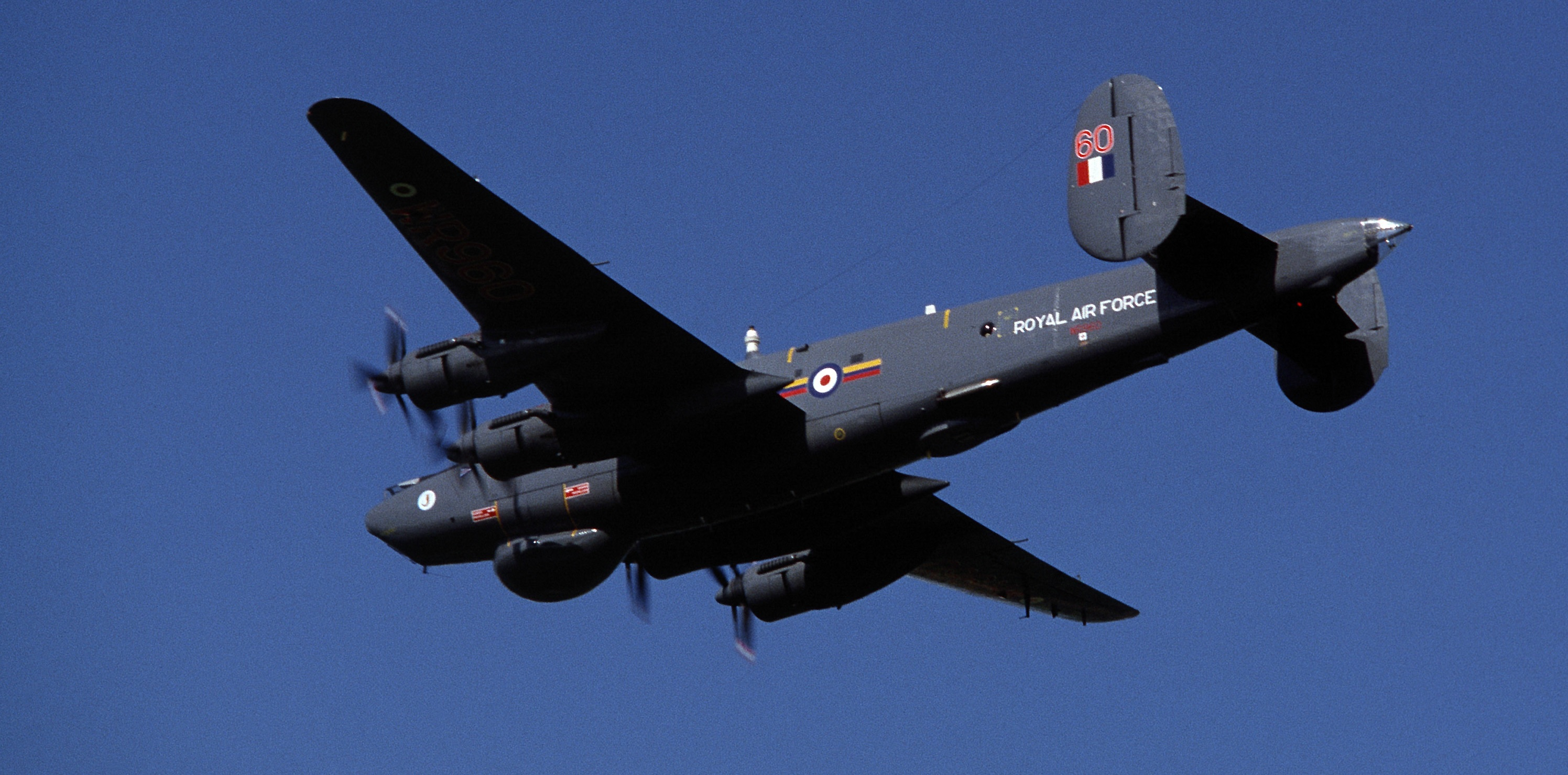
8 Sqn RAF flew the Shackleton AEW 2 from 1973 to 1991. This example was pictured on 26 June 1982

On 30 March 1951, the first Shackleton was delivered to No. 120 Squadron RAF; by the end of 1952 seven squadrons were operating the type, which soon came to be nicknamed The Growler on account of the engine noise from the four Rolls-Royce Griffon engines. The first operational deployment of the Shackleton occurred in 1955 as a troop-transport for British Army movements to Cyprus. Less than a year later, the type's first combat deployment took place during the Suez Crisis, codenamed Operation Musketeer.

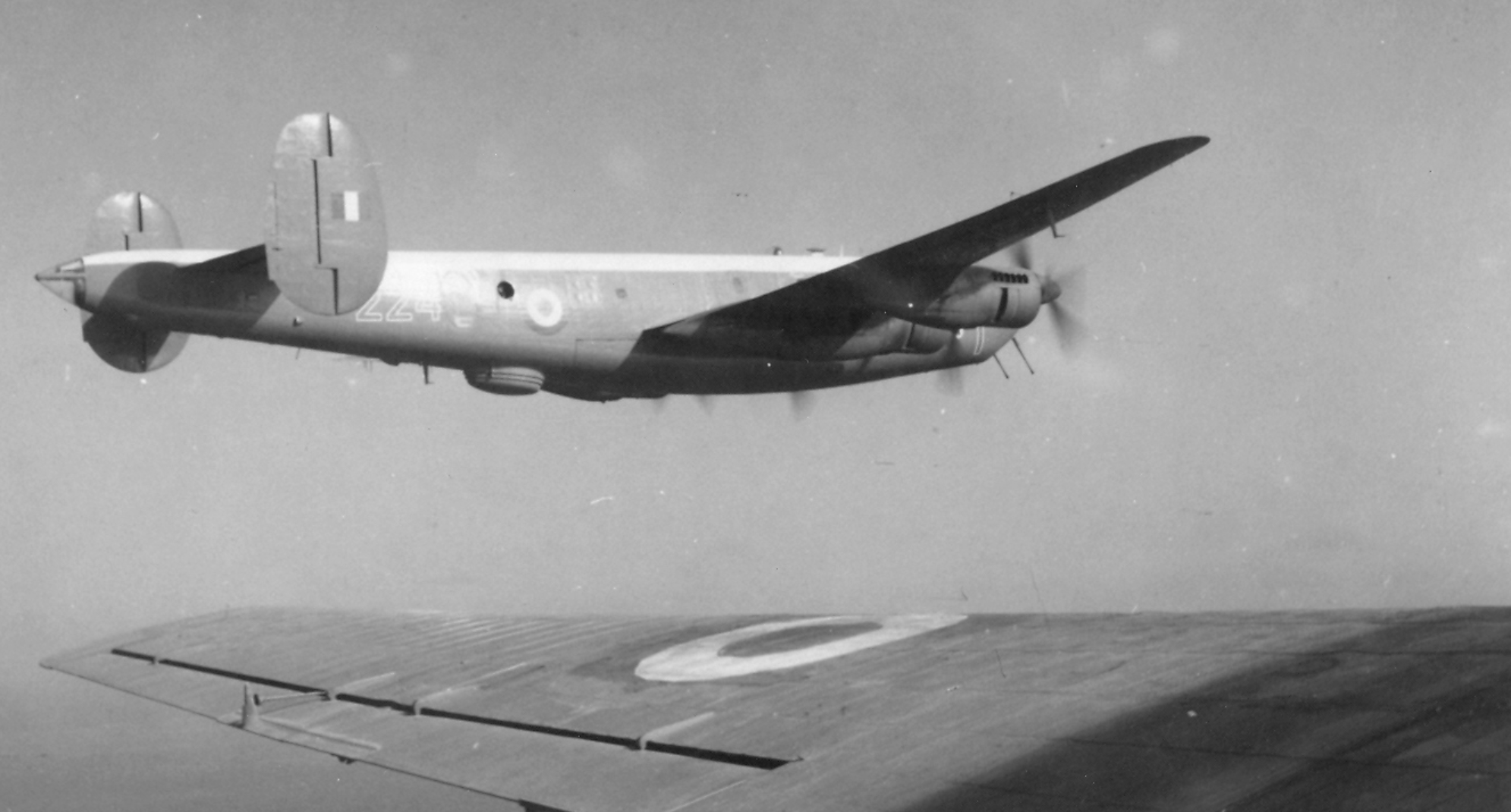
RAF Shackleton of 224 Squadron flying in formation during the 1954–1959 Jebel Akhdar War in Oman

In 1957, British RAF Shackletons participated heavily during the Jebel Akhdar War in Oman to expand the territory of the Sultanate, which was a de facto British colony, in order to gain access to oil wells in the interior of the country. The RAF made 1,635 raids, dropping 1,094 tons of bombs and firing 900 rockets at the interior of Oman between July and December 1958, targeting insurgents, mountain top villages, water channels and crops in a war that nevertheless remained low profile.

During the 1960s, the typical Shackleton crew comprised two pilots, two navigators, a flight engineer, an air electronics officer, and four air electronics operators. During this period, equipment upgrades had become routine in order to keep pace with ever more capable submarines. Problems with airframe fatigue were identified, leading to several programmes to strengthen the aircraft and thus extend its viable service life. In 1966, nuclear depth charges were introduced to the Shackleton's arsenal with the aim of countering the Soviets' development of deep-diving submarines.

Maritime reconnaissance was a large element of the Shackleton's service, this mission being to identify and monitor naval and merchant shipping, and to demonstrate sovereignty. During the Indonesia–Malaysia confrontation in the 1960s, Shackletons monitored the seas for vessels involved in arms smuggling. Similar operations were conducted in Cyprus, and Shackletons operating from bases in Madagascar co-operated with Royal Navy vessels to enforce a United Nations-mandated oil blockade of Rhodesia.

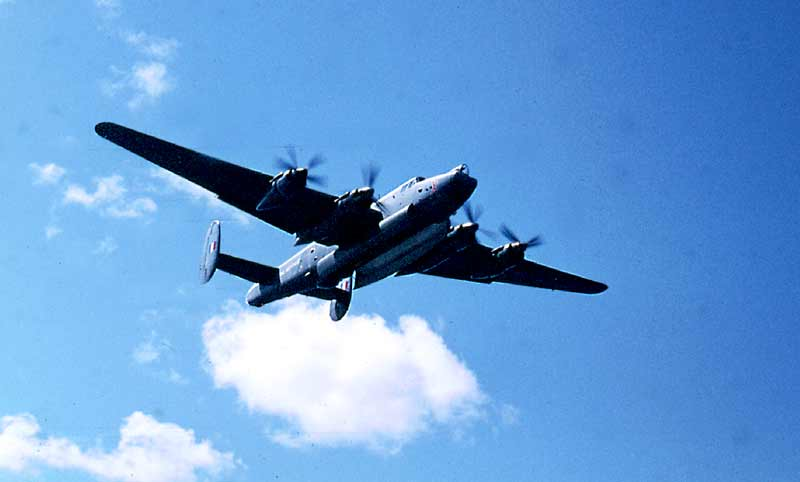
RAF Shackleton performing a mail drop in July 1970 for Royal Navy ships on the "Beira Patrol", blockading Beira to prevent Rhodesian oil imports

The Shackleton would often be used to perform search and rescue missions, one crew and aircraft being kept on standby somewhere in the UK for this role. The Shackleton also replaced the Avro Lincoln in the colonial policing mission, aircraft often being stationed in the Aden Protectorate and Oman to carry out various support missions, including convoy escorting, supply dropping, photo reconnaissance, communication relaying, and ground-attack missions. The Shackleton was also employed in several short-term bombing operations. Other roles included weather reconnaissance and transport duties, in the latter role each Shackleton carrying freight panniers in the bomb bay or up to 16 fully equipped soldiers.

In 1969, a jet-powered replacement patrol aircraft, the Hawker Siddeley Nimrod, began to enter RAF service, which was to spell the end for the Shackleton in most roles. While radically different in external appearance, the initial version of the Nimrod shared many sensor systems and onboard equipment with the Shackleton.

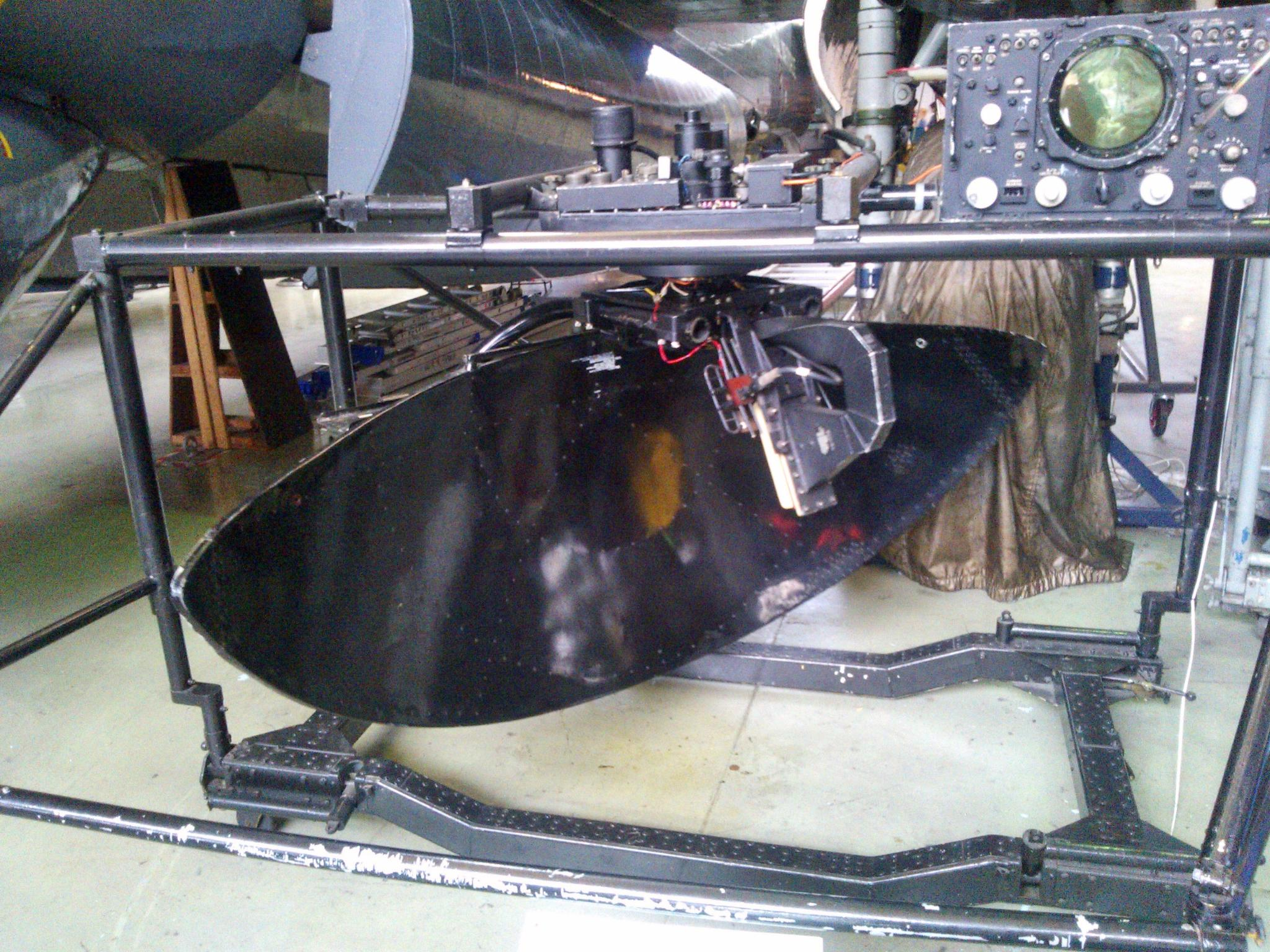
AN/APS-20 radar scanner

The intention to retire the Shackleton was thwarted by the need to provide AEW coverage in the North Sea and northern Atlantic following the withdrawal of the Fleet Air Arm's Fairey Gannet aircraft used in the AEW role in the 1970s. As an interim replacement, the existing AN/APS-20 radar from the Gannets was installed in modified Shackleton MR 2s, redesignated AEW 2, from 1972. These were operated by No. 8 Sqn, based at RAF Lossiemouth. All 12 AEW aircraft were given names from The Magic Roundabout and The Herbs TV series. The intended replacement, the British Aerospace Nimrod AEW3, suffered considerable development difficulties which culminated in it being cancelled in favour of an off-the-shelf purchase of the Boeing E-3 Sentry, finally allowing the last Shackletons to be retired in 1991.

=== South African Air Force ===
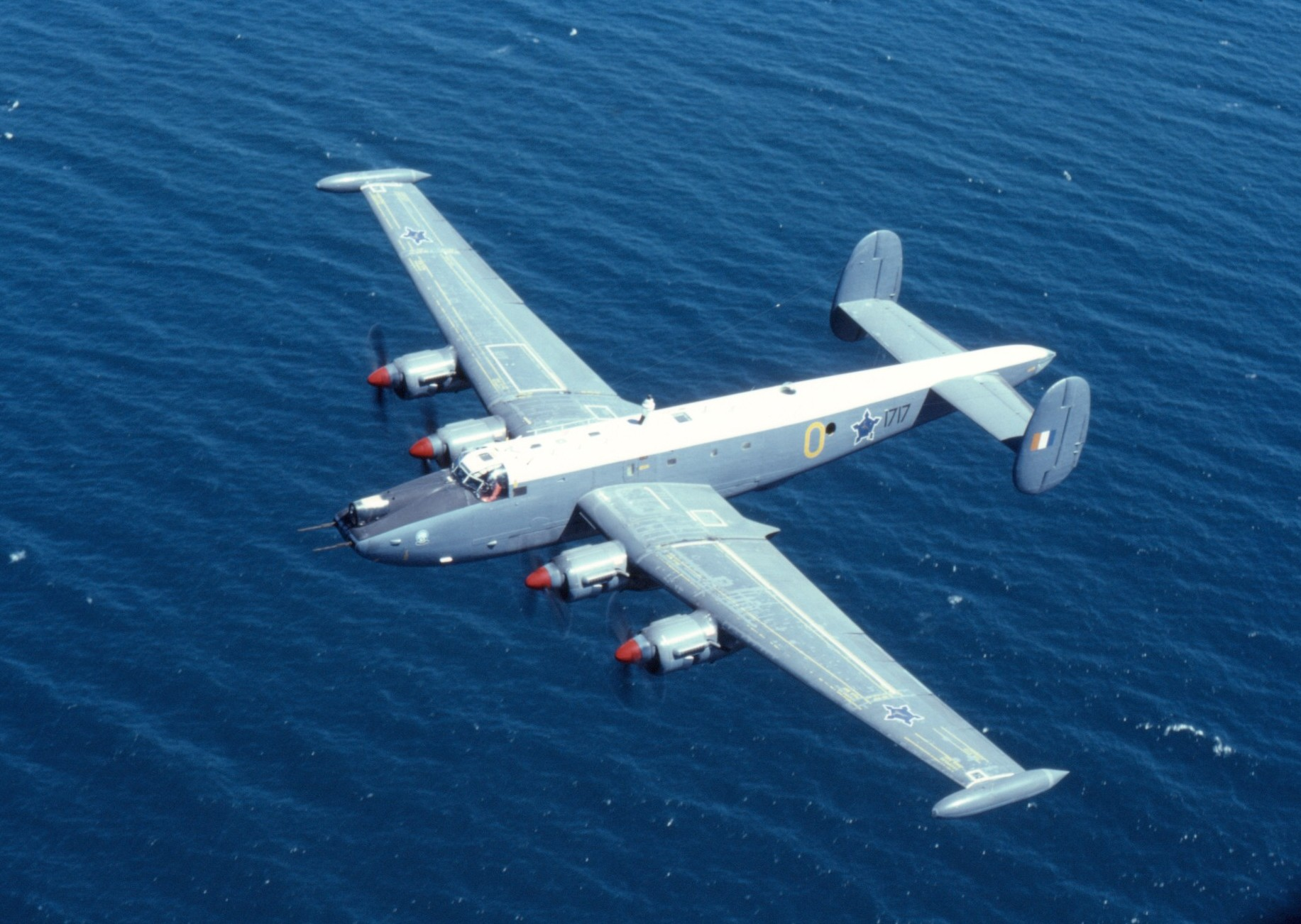
SAAF 1717 0 on patrol, October 1982

During the Second World War, the importance of securing the sea routes around the Cape of Good Hope had been made apparent, with over a hundred vessels being sunk in South African waters by enemy vessels between 1942 and 1945. Post-war, the South African Air Force sought a large and capable platform to perform the maritime patrol role. After evaluating four RAF MR 2s in 1953, an order was placed for eight Shackletons as a replacement for the SAAF's aging Short Sunderland maritime patrol aircraft. Modifications were required to match South African conditions and requirements, such as the ability to operate over the Indian Ocean. The resulting aircraft was designated the Shackleton MR 3.

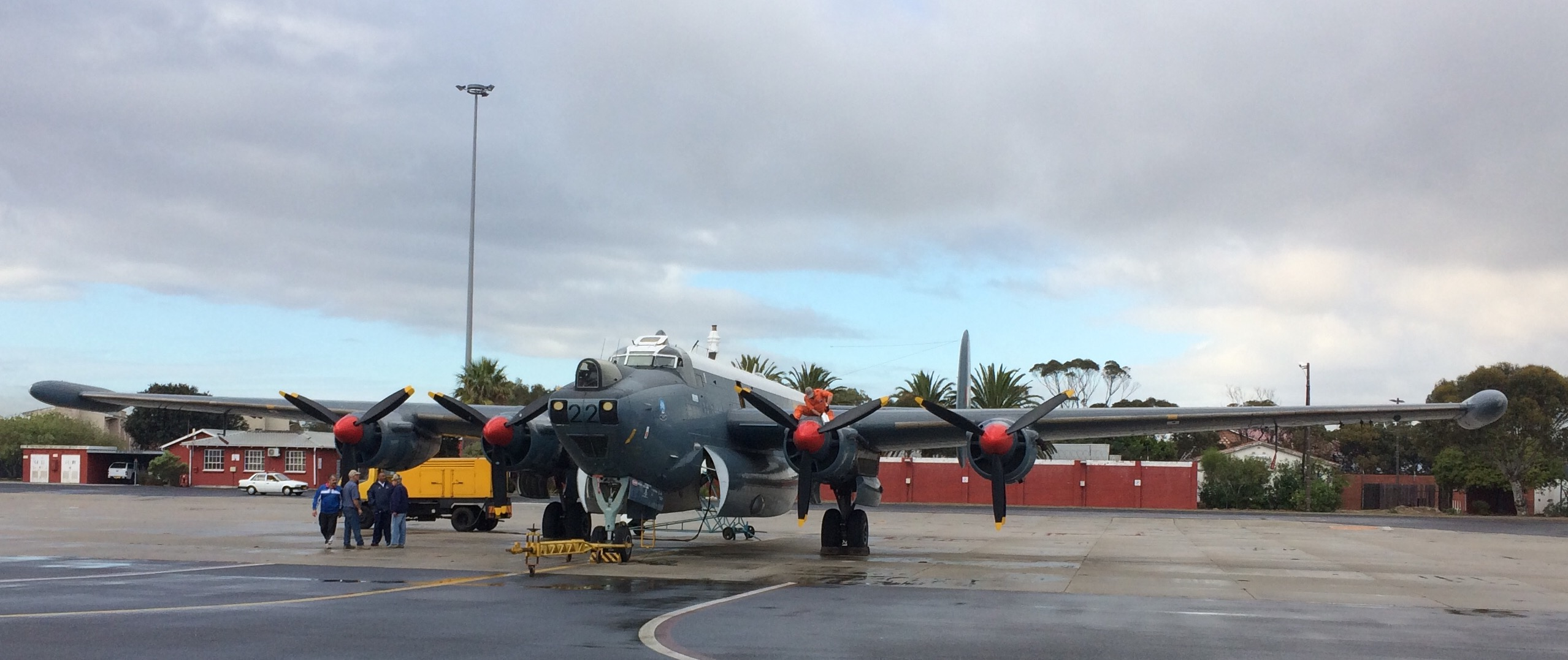
Avro Shackleton Mk 3 at Ysterplaat AFB in South Africa, serial 1722, a.k.a. Pelican 22. Taken 27 May 2017 at engine run-up. No longer flying but considered mostly airworthy.

On 18 August 1957, the first two Shackletons were delivered to D.F. Malan Airport, Cape Town. Two more followed on 13 October 1957 and the remainder arrived in February 1958. Delivered to the same basic standard as the RAF's MR 3s, they were assigned single letter codes between "J" and "Q" and operated by 35 Squadron SAAF. The type typically patrolled the sea lanes around the Cape of Good Hope, often monitoring Soviet vessels transiting between the Indian and Atlantic oceans. The Shackleton was briefly used in low-level overland patrols along the Southern Rhodesian border, but these operations ended in response to concerns regarding the disturbance of wildlife.

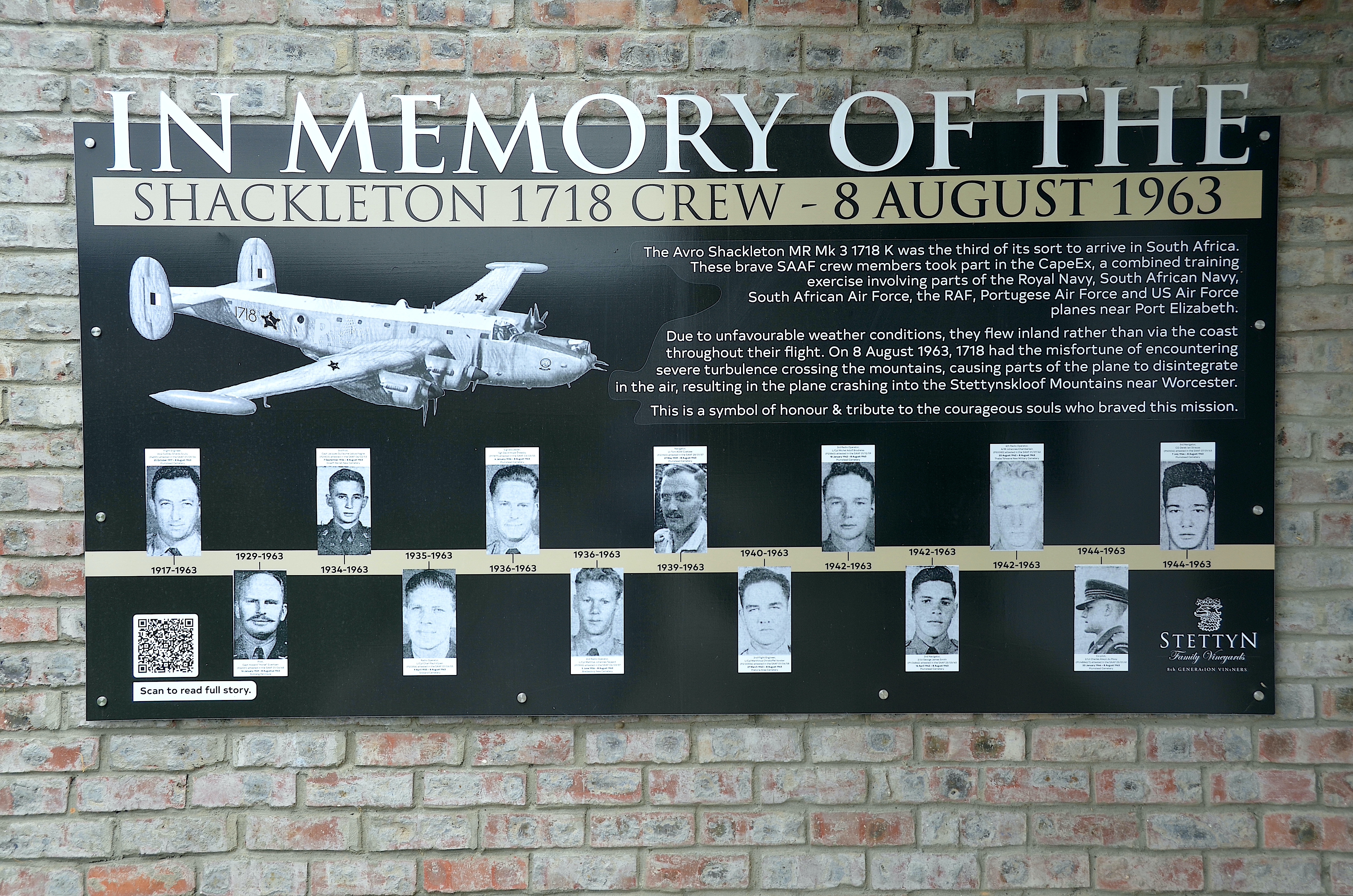
Commemorating crew of Shakleton MR.3 1718 (1963 in South Africa)

The Shackleton would often be called upon to perform search and rescue operations in the treacherous waters around the Cape. In March 1971, Shackletons successfully intervened in the SS Wafra oil spill, deliberately sinking the stricken oil tanker with depth charges in order to prevent an ecological disaster. The only operational loss incurred was 1718 K, which crashed into the Wemmershoek mountains at night time on 8 August 1963 with the loss of all thirteen crew.

South Africa's policy of apartheid led to an embargo imposed by the United Nations, which made acquiring components for the Shackleton fleet increasingly difficult, the aircraft's serviceability suffering as a result. The fleet had been modified to Phase III standards prior to the implementation of the arms embargo, albeit without the auxiliary Viper engine. Two of the aircraft were re-sparred, 1716 J in the United Kingdom and 1717 O in South Africa by the SAAF, but the lack of engine spares and tyres, together with airframe fatigue, took a gradual toll. By November 1984, the fatigue lives of all but the two re-sparred aircraft had expired and the fleet was retired into storage. Although the joke has been applied to several aircraft, the Shackleton was often described as "a hundred thousand rivets flying in close formation."

== Variants ==
=== Avro 696 Shackleton prototypes ===
Three prototype Type 696s were ordered in May 1947 to meet specification R 5/46:

VW126
The first prototype which initially flew on 9 March 1949.
VW131
First flown on 2 September 1949.
VW135
First flown on 29 March 1950.

=== Avro 696 Shackleton Mk.1 ===
Shackleton MR.Mk.1
The first production model for the RAF with a dorsal twin 20 mm cannon turret, 29-built. First production aircraft flew on 28 March 1950 and the variant entered service with 120 Squadron at RAF Kinloss in March 1951.
Shackleton MR.Mk.1A
Variant powered by four Griffon 57A V12 piston engines, in service from April 1951, 47-built and all surviving MR.1s converted.
Shackleton T.4
Navigation trainer conversion from MR 1As between 1956 and 1961, mid-upper turret and crew rest area removed, additional radar and radio positions for trainees added, 17 conversions.

=== Avro 696 Shackleton Mk.2 ===
The Mark 2 had a longer nose and the radome was moved to the ventral position. A lookout position was added to the tail, two more 20 mm cannons were added in the nose, and twin retractable tailwheels were fitted. One aircraft, WB833, originally ordered as an MR.1 was built as an MR.2 prototype and first flew on 17 June 1952. The last ten MR.1s on the production line were completed as MR.2s and orders for 80 new-build aircraft were placed; the last 21 were completed as MR.3s, the total number of MR.2s built being 69. The first aircraft entered service with 42 Squadron at RAF St Eval in January 1953.

Mk.2s were later modified in parallel with phased modifications to the Mk.3:

MR.Mk.2 Phase 1 or MR.Mk.2C: as per Mk.3 Phase 1. Also received the sonics plotting table from the Mk.3.

MR.Mk.2 Phase 2: as per Mk.3 Phase 2.

MR.Mk.2 Phase 3: as per Mk.3 Phase 3, except that the Viper engines were not fitted.

Shackleton T.2 Ten MR 2 Phase 3 aircraft were modified in 1967 as T.2s at Langar to replace the T.4s with the Maritime Operational Training Units as radar trainers, with master and slave radar positions for training installed.

Shackleton AEW.2 In 1971 twelve MR.2s were converted at Woodford and Bitteswell as Airborne Early Warning aircraft, being fitted with AN/APS-20 radar in order to perform the Airborne Early Warning role. The first AEW.2 flew on 30 September 1971 and the type entered service with 8 Squadron on 1 January 1972. The AEW.2 was retired on 1 July 1991.

=== Avro 716 Shackleton Mk.3 ===
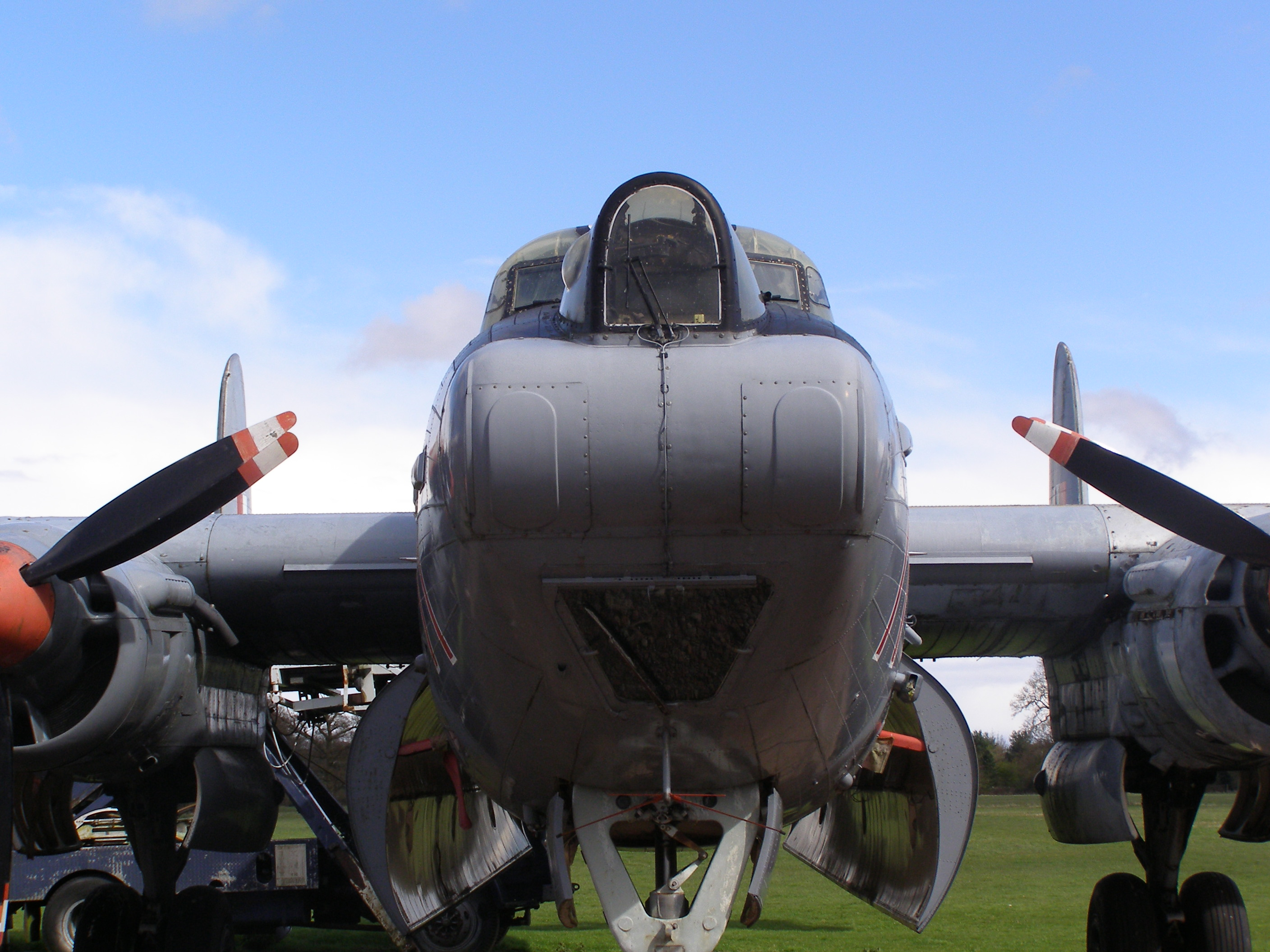
MR3 on display in 2008

Shackleton MR.Mk.3 Tailwheel undercarriage replaced by a tricycle undercarriage, nose entrance hatch added and wingtip tanks fitted to increase fuel capacity. To increase crew comfort the inside was sound proofed, better crew seats were fitted and the tactical team positions rearranged. To make room for some of the internal rearrangement the dorsal turret was deleted. The first MR.3 flew on 2 September 1955; the aircraft had problems with stalling characteristics and crashed on 7 December 1956. The variant entered service with 220 Squadron at RAF St Eval in August 1957. The RAF ordered 52 aircraft but later, following the 1956 Defence Review, the order was reduced to 33 aircraft. An additional aircraft was also built to replace the aircraft lost during stalling trials. An additional eight aircraft were exported to South Africa.

The aircraft underwent several phased modifications:

The Phase 1 update introduced changes mainly to the internal equipment.

The Phase 2 update introduced ECM equipment, the distinctive Orange Harvest 'spark plug' ESM aerial and an improved High Frequency radio.

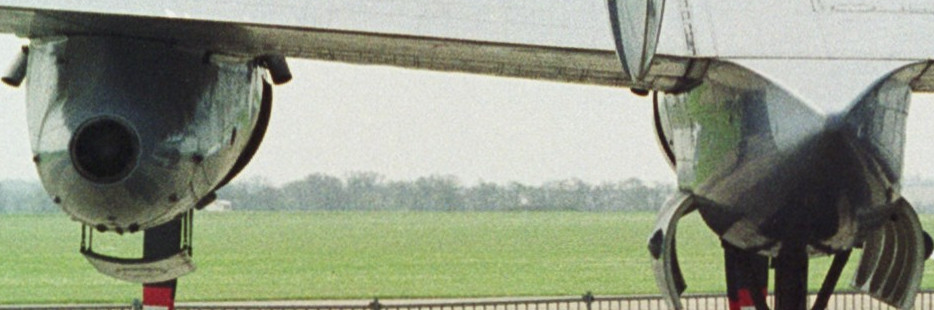
MR.3 XF708 left wing showing outer engine nacelle (left) with propellers at front and Viper turbojet exhaust at rear. Compare with inner nacelle.

The Phase 3 update introduced two Armstrong Siddeley Viper turbojet engines at the rear of the outboard engine nacelles to be used for assisted takeoff. The wing main spars had to be strengthened due to the additional engines. A new navigation system was also fitted and there were some modification to the internal arrangement, including a shorter crew rest area to give more room for the tactical positions.

=== Projected designs ===
Avro 717 and 719 Shackleton MR.Mk.4
Project for a re-engined MR.Mk.1 using Napier Nomad engines. Two Nomads were installed in the outer nacelles of a Shackleton prototype to create the only Avro 717 example, but the program was cancelled before the aircraft could be flown. The Avro 719 would have replaced all four Griffons with Nomads.

Shackleton MR.Mk.5
MR.Mk.5 was a suggested designation for a Nomad-powered variant of the Mk.2.

== Operators ==
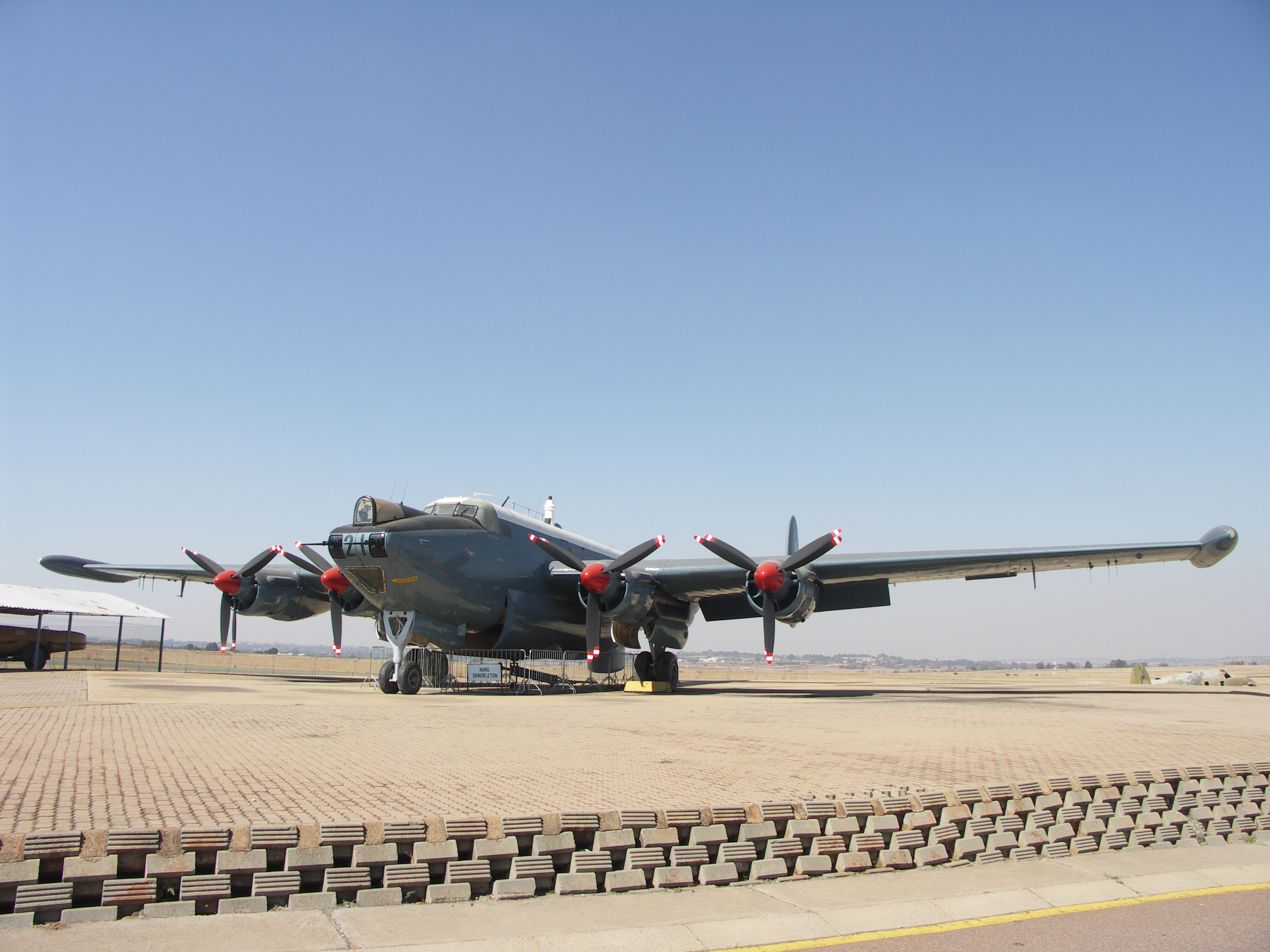
Retired SAAF 1721 N, on permanent display at Swartkop

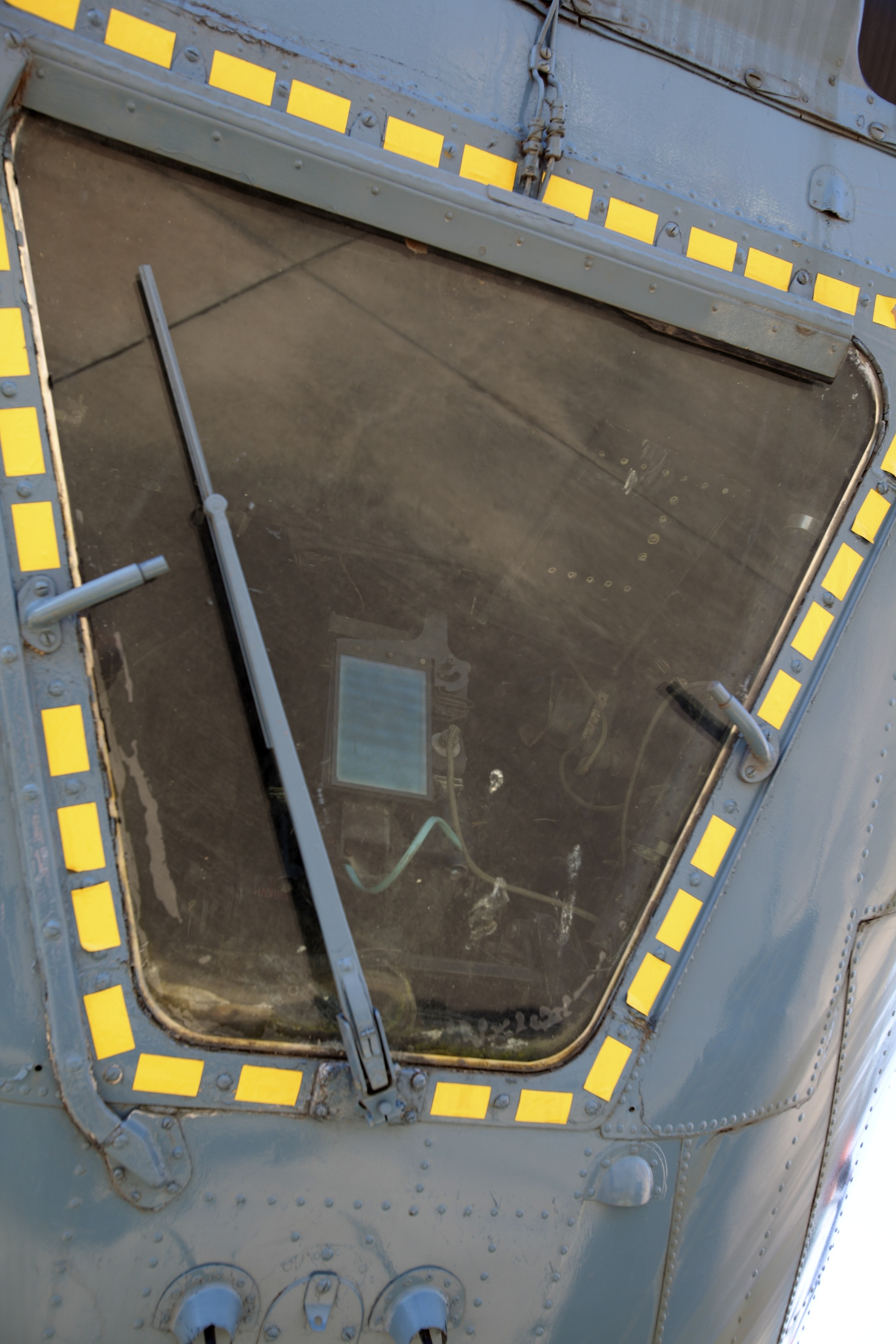
Bomb aimer's position and bombsight on SAAF 1721 N

South Africa

- South African Air Force
  - 35 Squadron SAAF received eight aircraft.

United Kingdom

- Royal Aircraft Establishment – Purchased a MR.3 in 1959.
- Royal Air Force
  - No. 8 Squadron RAF – Formed in 1972 to operate the AEW.2 at RAF Kinloss, moved to RAF Lossiemouth in 1973.
  - No. 37 Squadron RAF – 1953–67, converted to the MR2 from the Lancaster GR3 at RAF Luqa, moved to RAF Khormaksar in 1957, disbanded in 1967.
  - No. 38 Squadron RAF – 1953–67, converted to the MR2 from the Lancaster GR3 at RAF Luqa, moved to RAF Hal Far in 1965, disbanded in 1967.
  - No. 42 Squadron RAF – 1952–71, formed at RAF St Eval with the MR1A (1952–54) and the MR2 (from 1953), moved to RAF St Mawgan in 1958, converted to the MR3 in 1965–66, converted to the Nimrod MR1 in 1971.
  - No. 120 Squadron RAF – 1951–71, converted to the MR1 from the Lancaster GR3 in 1951 at RAF Kinloss, moved to RAF Aldergrove in 1952, converted to the MR2 in 1953 and the MR3 in 1958, moved to RAF Kinloss in 1959, converted to the Nimrod MR1 in 1970.
  - No. 201 Squadron RAF – 1958–70, re-numbered from 220 Squadron in 1958 operating the MR3 at RAF St Mawgan, moved to RAF Kinloss in 1965, converted to Nimrod MR1 in 1970.
  - No. 203 Squadron RAF- 1958–71, re-numbered from 240 Squadron at RAF Ballykelly in 1958 with the MR1A and MR3, converted to the MR2 in 1962 and back to the MR3 in 1966, moved to RAF Luqa in 1969, converted to Nimrod MR1 in 1971.
  - No. 204 Squadron RAF – 1954–71, formed at RAF Ballykelly with the MR2, also operated the MR1A (1958–60), and the MR2C (1959–71), disbanded in April 1971 and reformed at RAF Honington on the same day from the Majunga Detachment Support Unit with the MR2C, detachments to Majunga, Tengah and Masirah, disbanded in 1972.
  - No. 205 Squadron RAF – 1958–71, converted to the MR1 from the Sunderland GR5 at RAF Changi, converted to the MR2C in 1962, disbanded in 1971.
  - No. 206 Squadron RAF – 1952–70, formed at RAF St Eval with the MR1A, also operated the MR2 from 1953 to 1954, moved to RAF St Mawgan in 1958 and converted to the MR3, moved to RAF Kinloss in 1965, converted to the Nimrod MR1 in 1970.
  - No. 210 Squadron RAF – 1958–71, re-numbered from 269 Squadron with the MR2 at RAF Ballykelly, disbanded in 1970, reformed the next day at RAF Sharjah, disbanded in November 1971.
  - No. 220 Squadron RAF – 1951–1958, formed at RAF Kinloss with the MR1A, moved to RAF St Eval in 1951, also operated the MR2 (1953–54), moved to RAF St Mawgan in 1956, operated the MR2 (1957) and the MR3 (1957–58), renumbered 201 Squadron in October 1958.
  - No. 224 Squadron RAF – 1951–66, converted to the MR1 from the Halifax GR6 at RAF Gibraltar, converted to the MR2 in 1953, disbanded in 1966.
  - No. 228 Squadron RAF – 1954–59, formed with the MR2 from elements of 206 Squadron at RAF St Eval, moved to RAF St Mawgan in 1956, moved back to RAF St Eval in 1958, disbanded in 1959.
  - No. 240 Squadron RAF – 1952–1958, formed with the MR1 from elements of 120 Squadron at RAF Aldergrove, moved to RAF St Eval in 1952 for a few months before moving to RAF Ballykelly, operated the MR2 from 1953 to 1954, renumbered 203 Squadron in 1958.
  - No. 269 Squadron RAF – 1952–58, formed with the MR1 from elements of 224 Squadron at RAF Gibraltar, moved to RAF Ballykelly in 1952, also operated the MR2 (1953–54), also operated the MR2 in 1958 as they were renumbered 210 Squadron.
  - No. 236 Operational Conversion Unit RAF – 1951–56, received the first MR.1s in 1951 at RAF Kinloss, redesignated the Maritime Operational Training Unit in 1956.
  - Maritime Operational Training Unit, RAF – Redesignated from 236 OCU in 1956 with 15 MR.1As, the MR.1As were slowly replaced by T.4s, moved to RAF St Mawgan in 1965, the last T.4 was replaced by a T.2 in 1968.
  - Air-Sea Warfare Development Unit RAF – 1951–60 at RAF St. Mawgan and RAF Ballykelly.
  - Joint Anti-submarine School – Operated the MR.2 between 1954 and 1957 at RAF Ballykelly.

== Surviving aircraft ==
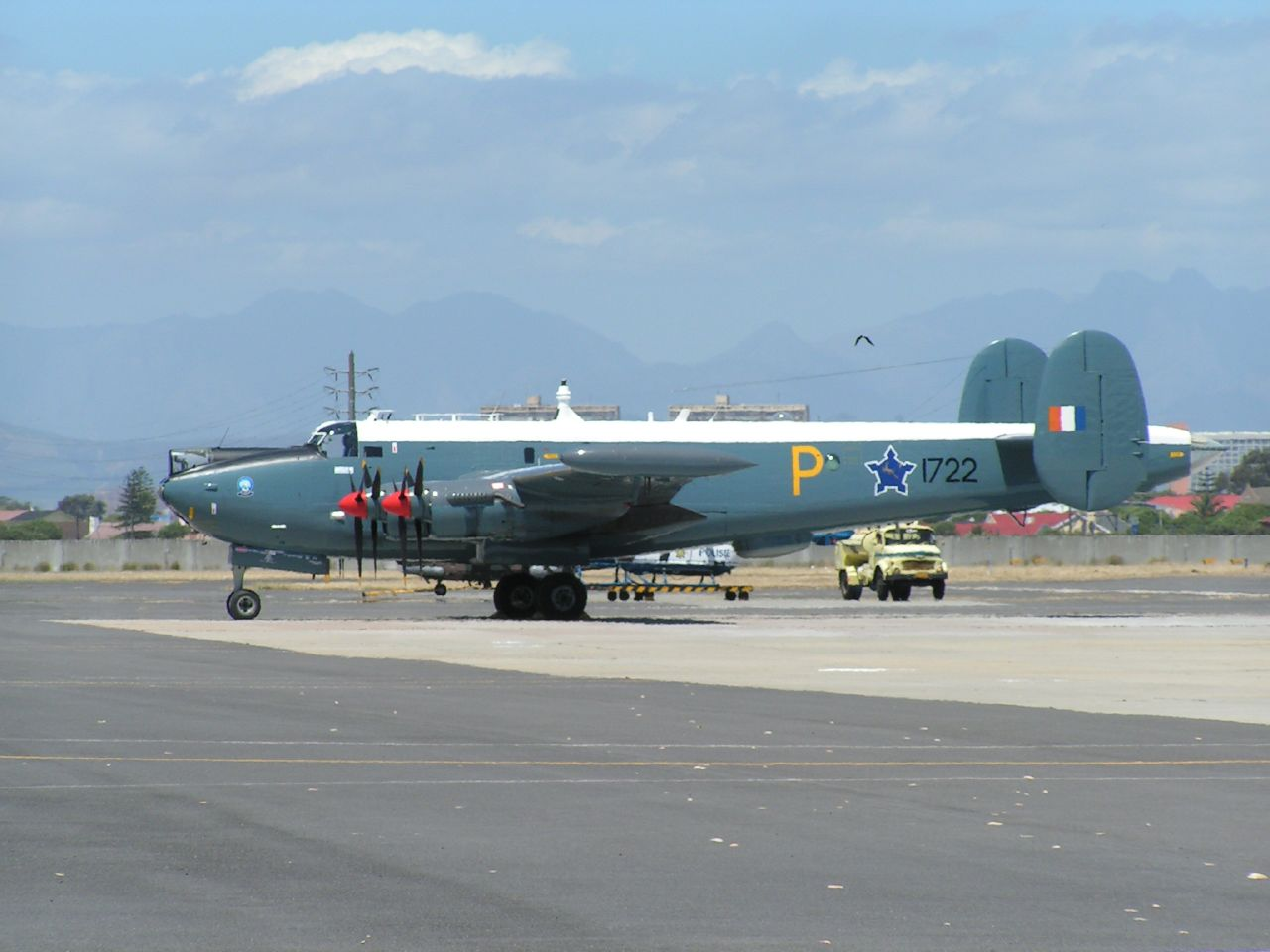
SAAF 1722 P, the last flying Shackleton MR.3

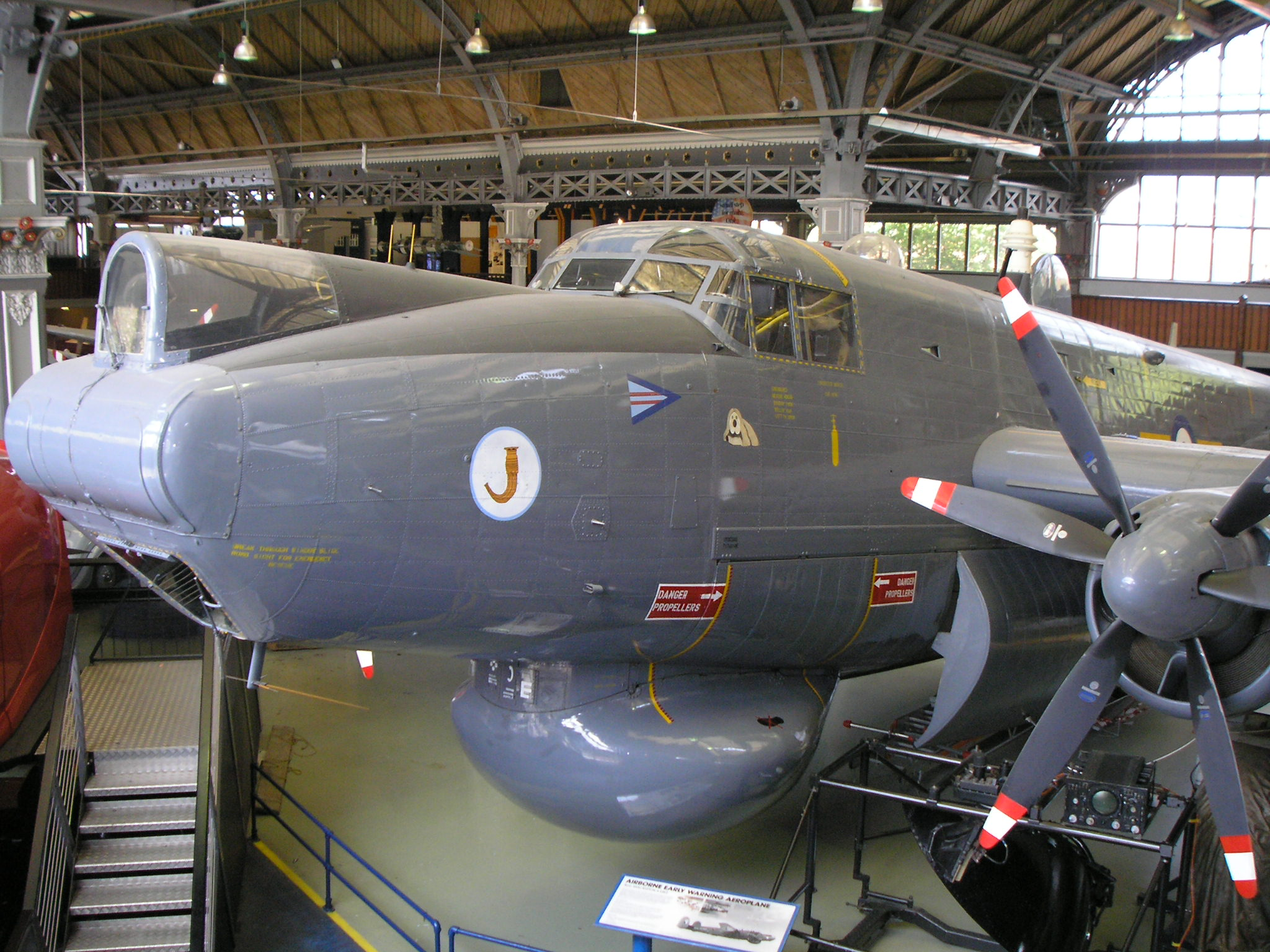
A Shackleton AEW.2 on display at the Science and Industry Museum in Manchester

A complete list is available here.

=== Cyprus ===
Stored or under restoration

- AEW.2 WL747 stands abandoned at the western end of runway 11/29 at Paphos International Airport, Cyprus.
- MR/T.2 WR967 'Dodo' Ex Crew Trainer. Paphos dump.
- XF700 Nicosia dump.

=== South Africa ===
On display

- SAAF 1721 on display at the South African Air Force Museum, Swartkop.
- SAAF 1722 commonly known as 'Pelican 22' was the last airworthy Shackleton MR.3. The aircraft is owned by the South African Air Force Museum based at AFB Ysterplaat. It was one of eight Shackletons operated by the South African Air Force from 1957 to 1984. Airworthy but has been grounded for safety and preservation reasons as well as for a lack of qualified crew.
- SAAF 1723 at Vic's Viking Garage, next to the Golden Highway, Meredale, Johannesburg.

=== United Kingdom ===
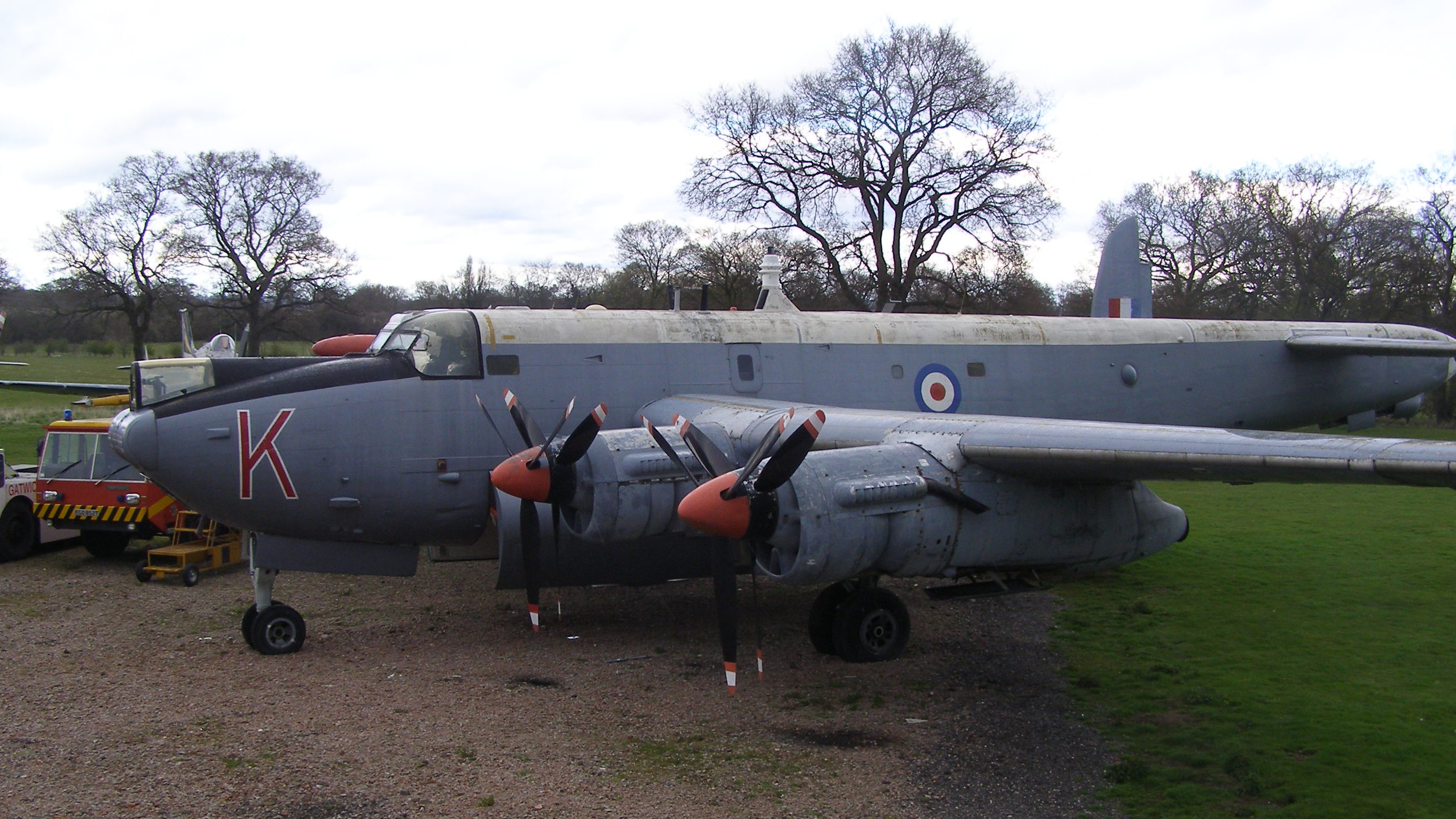
MR.3 at the Gatwick Aviation Museum

Stored or under restoration

- MR.2 WR963, formerly located at Coventry Airport; engines could be run on this airframe. Aircraft is being relocated to Yorkshire Air Museum at Elvington near York.

On display

- MR.1 VP293 Nose section: owned by Norman Thelwell and on loan to the Shackleton Aviation Group.
- MR.1 WG511 Fuselage: Cornwall Aero Park, Helston.
- MR.2 WL756 Forward nose at Caernafon, N.Wales.
- MR.2 WL795 at RAF St. Mawgan, England.
- AEW.2 WR960 at the Avro Heritage Museum in Woodford. (Following the closure of the MOSI Air & Space Hall in Manchester)
- MR.3 WR971 at Fuselage section: Fenland and West Norfolk Aviation Museum, Wisbech Cambs.
- MR.3 WR974 at South Wales Aviation Museum, St. Athan, Glamorgan.
- MR.3 WR977 at Newark Air Museum, England.
- MR.3 WR982 at Gatwick Aviation Museum, England. Engines can be run on this airframe.
- MR.3 WR985 at Long Marston Airfield, Warwickshire (derelict).
- MR.3 XF708 at the Imperial War Museum, Duxford, England.

=== Western Sahara ===
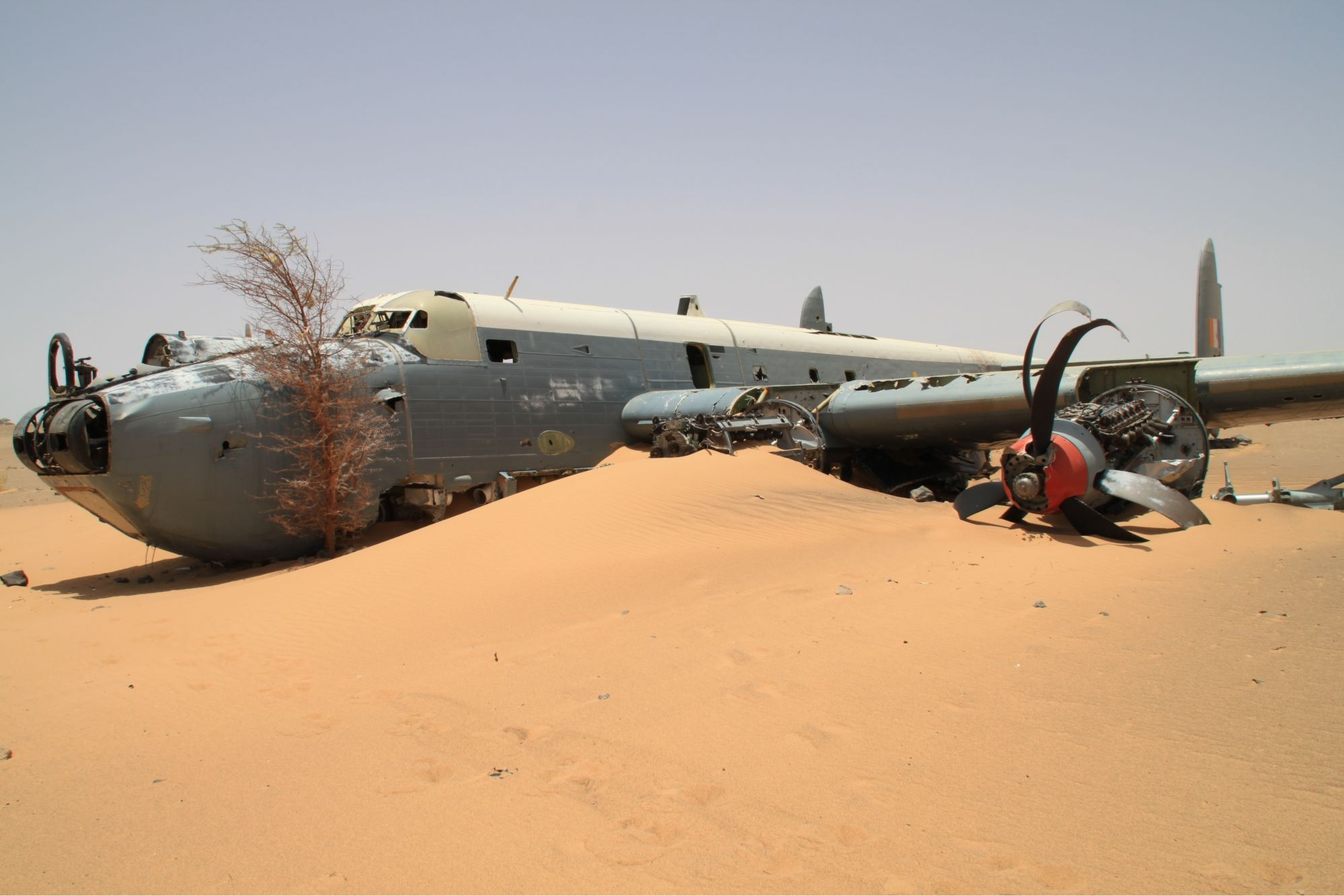
SAAF 1716 J ('Pelican 16'), crashed in the Sahara in 1994

- SAAF 1716 J Pelican 16 in the Sahara Desert (22.630489°N 13.237356°W) approximately 2 hours from Zouérat, where it crashed while en route to IWM Duxford for preservation on July 13, 1994. The airframe sustained moderate damage during the accident but remained intact, and has remained in place at the crash site to the present day. All 19 of the aircraft's crew survived the incident.

=== United States ===
On display

- AEW.2 WL790 (N790WL) at Pima Air & Space Museum, Tucson, Arizona, USA.

== Specifications ==
Orthographic projection of the Avro Shackleton MR Mk 1A, with profile views of all the other major variants

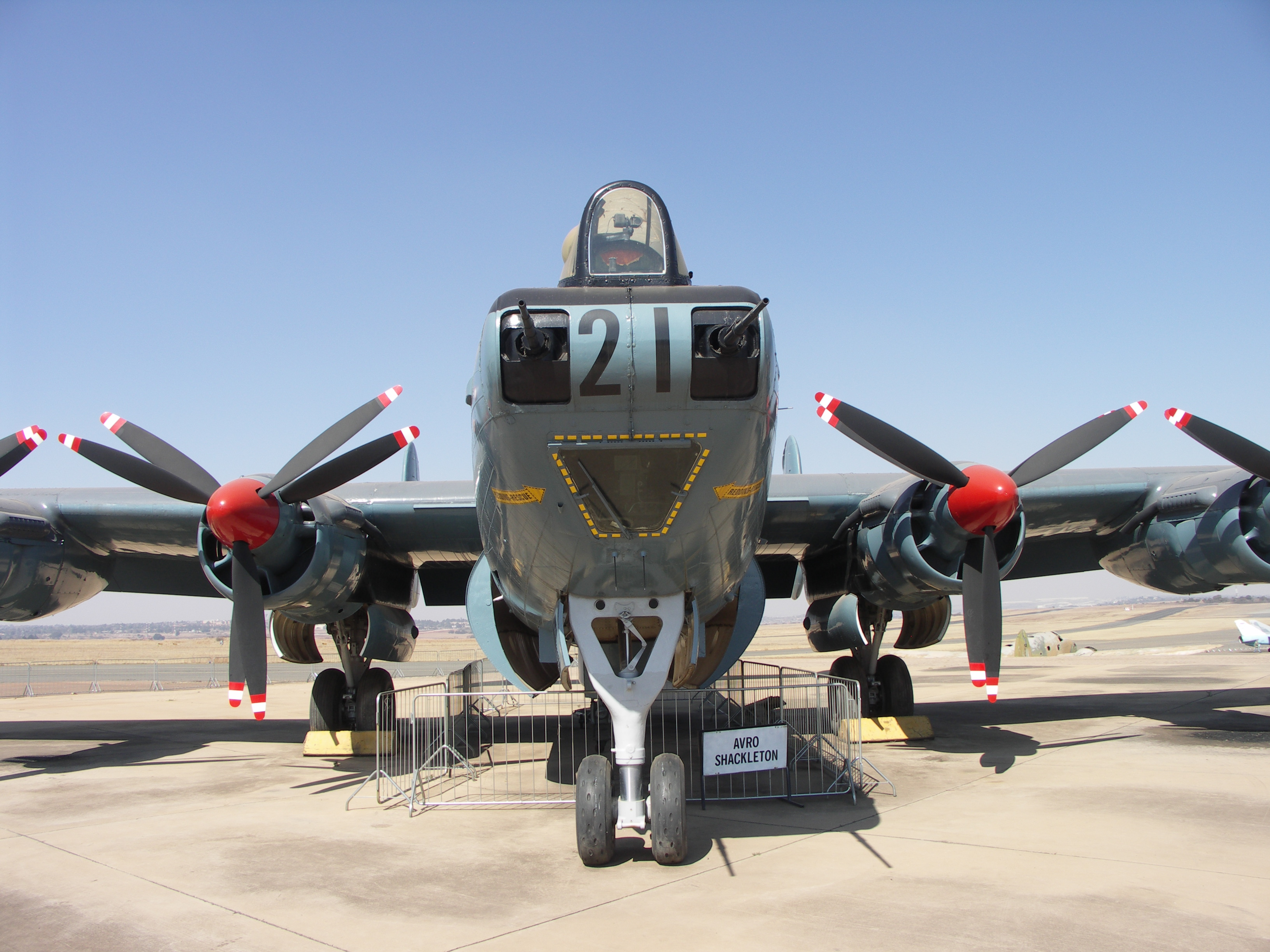
Head on view. Note the two nose-mounted 20 mm Hispano cannons

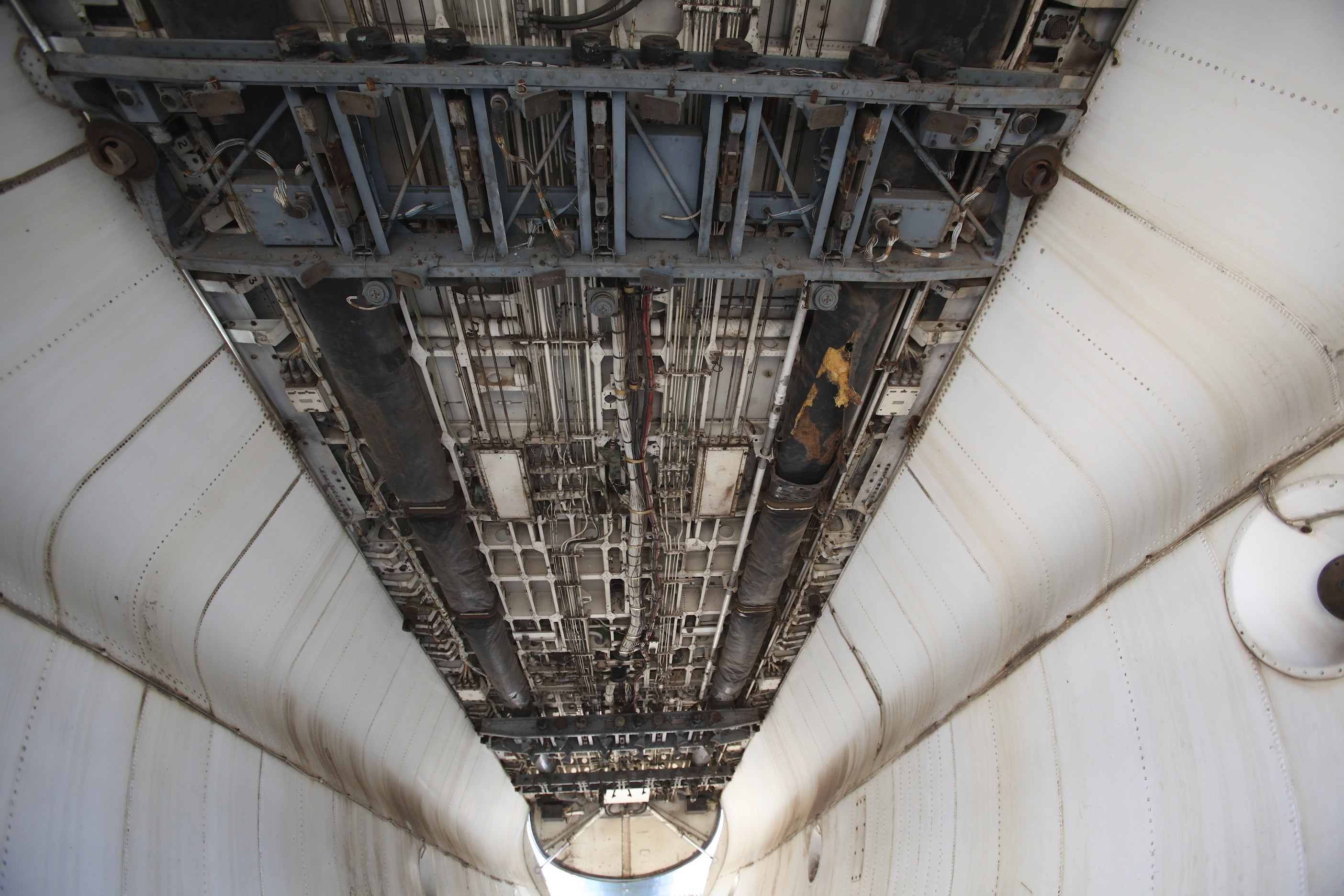
Interior of a Shackleton's bomb bay

External videos
- 1990s documentary on the Avro Shackleton
- Engine run of a preserved Shackleton
- Shackleton displaying at RAF Cosford, 1991

Data from Flight International, Jones

General characteristics

- Crew: 10
- Length: 87 ft 4 in (26.62 m)
- Wingspan: 120 ft (37 m)
- Height: 17 ft 6 in (5.33 m)
- Wing area: 1,421 sq ft (132.0 m^{2})
- Airfoil: root: NACA 23018 modified; tip: NACA 23012
- Empty weight: 51,400 lb (23,315 kg)
- Max takeoff weight: 86,000 lb (39,009 kg)
- Fuel capacity: 4,258 imp gal (5,114 US gal; 19,360 L)
- Powerplant: 4 × Rolls-Royce Griffon 57 V-12 liquid-cooled piston engines, 1,960 hp (1,460 kW) each
- Propellers: 6-bladed de Havilland Propellers, 13 ft 4 in (4.06 m) diameter contra-rotating fully feathering constant-speed propellers

Performance

- Maximum speed: 260 kn (300 mph, 480 km/h)
- Range: 1,950 nmi (2,240 mi, 3,610 km)
- Endurance: 14 hours 36 minutes
- Service ceiling: 20,200 ft (6,200 m)
- Wing loading: 61 lb/sq ft (300 kg/m^{2})
- Power/mass: 0.091 hp/lb (0.150 kW/kg)

Armament

- Guns: 2 × 20 mm Hispano Mark V cannon in the nose
- Bombs: 10,000 lb (4,536 kg) of bombs, torpedoes, mines, or conventional or nuclear depth charges, such as the Mk 101 Lulu

Avionics

- ASV radar
- Sonobuoys
- ESM (Orange Harvest)
- Submarine detection equipment (various)
- Navigation avionics
- Blue Silk Doppler
- Tacan
- Radio compass
- Zero reader
- GPI MK4
- GM7 compass

== See also ==
Related development

- Avro Lancaster
- Avro Lincoln

Aircraft of comparable role, configuration, and era

- Bréguet 1150 Atlantic
- Canadair CP-107 Argus
- Consolidated PB4Y-2 Privateer
- Lockheed P-2 Neptune
- Lockheed P-3 Orion
- Tupolev Tu-95

Related lists

- List of accidents and incidents involving the Avro Shackleton
- List of aircraft of the Royal Air Force
- List of aircraft of the South African Air Force
