= 1990 Scotland RAF Shackleton crash =

RAF Shackleton crash on the Isle of Harris, Scotland

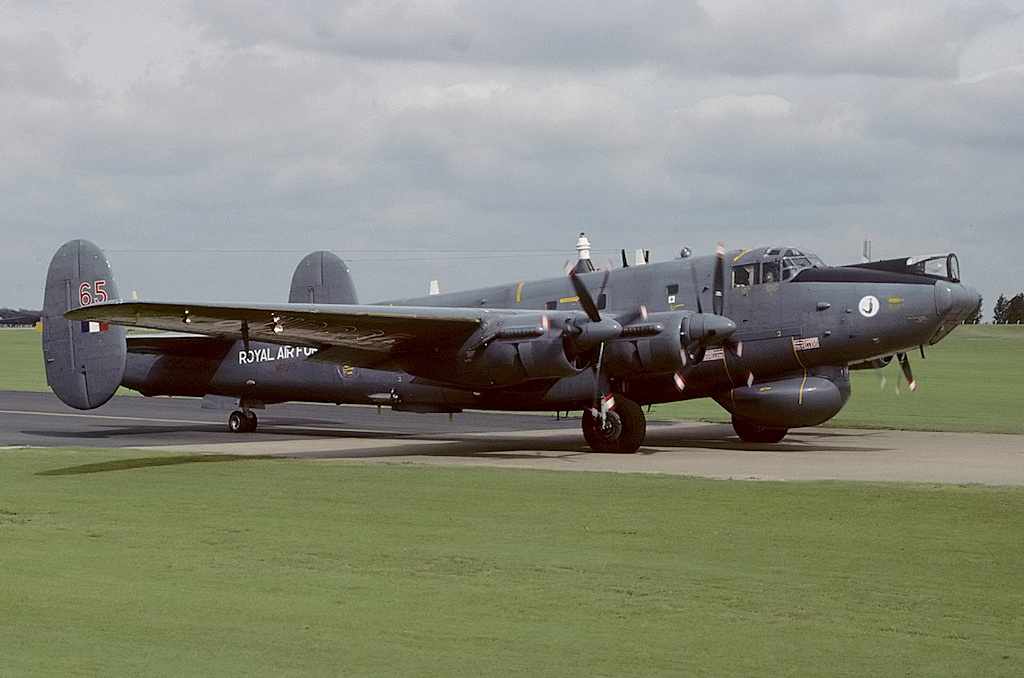
- Avro Shackleton WR965

Accident
- Date: 30 April 1990
- Summary: Controlled flight into terrain
- Site: near Tarbert, Scotland; 57.8048°N 7.0556°W

Aircraft
- Aircraft type: Avro Shackleton
- Aircraft name: Dylan
- Operator: Royal Air Force
- Call sign: Gambia Zero 8
- Registration: WR965
- Flight origin: RAF Lossiemouth
- Destination: RAF Benbecula
- Crew: 10
- Fatalities: 10

On 30 April 1990, a Royal Air Force (RAF) Avro Shackleton Mk II AEW aircraft, of No. 8 Squadron RAF, based at RAF Lossiemouth, crashed into a hill in the Isle of Harris whilst attempting to land at RAF Benbecula. All ten crew on board died in the crash, which included the wing commander who was in charge of No. 8 Squadron at the time. The Shackleton was the last of the fleet to be involved in a fatal accident, and the type was withdrawn from RAF service in 1991.

A Board of Inquiry (BoI) later determined the accident as a controlled flight into terrain, but could not ascertain as to why.

== Background ==
WR965 was introduced into RAF service in 1957, originally sent to RAF Khormaksar, and served on No.s 37, 38, 203, 204, 205 and 224 Squadrons before its conversion to an Airborne Early Warning (AEW) aircraft in the early 1970s. The need for an AEW platform was brought about by the retirement of the Royal Navy Fairey Gannet airframe. No. 8 Squadron RAF, started flying the Avro Shackleton aircraft in 1971. The Shackleton itself, was a stop-gap measure that was developed from the MR2 Shackleton variant, which was developed from the original bomber type from Avro which had descended from their Lancaster and Lincoln aircraft. The Nimrod AEW was to have assumed the role of the Shackleton's in the mid-1980s, but the technological problems proved "insurmountable", and so that programme was cancelled in favour of the Boeing E-3 Sentry aircraft in December 1986.

The squadron was based at RAF Lossiemouth at the time of the crash, and all of their aircraft were named after characters in the children's TV programme, The Magic Roundabout. The aircraft as a whole were collectively referred to as Growlers, on account of the engine noise, and the Old Grey ladies, due to their colour scheme. The engines were noisy due to their contra-rotating propellers.

== Incident ==
WR965, had taken off from RAF Lossiemouth in Moray, Scotland, at 8:00 am on 30 April 1990, with a callsign of Gambia Zero 8 and had flown 150 miles (240 km) to the Outer Hebrides. The aircraft had been partaking in a military exercise (Ex Bushfire) when the accident occurred. The radar on board the aircraft had been turned off due to the parameters of part of the exercise, which involved "mutual training" with a Tornado F3 aircraft. Early reports by eye-witnesses lead to accusations that a missile strike was responsible for bringing the aircraft down, something which the RAF denied.

Just before 12:00, the pilot radioed ahead to RAF Benbecula to ask for an approach, stating that the aircraft was 20 miles (32 km) out. Permission was given for a landing from the west and the aircraft was seen to circle at least twice by RAF personnel on the island before it crashed almost 25 miles (40 km) away into Maodal, an 800-foot (240 m) high peak near the village of Northton, (at grid reference NF998907). The weather was described as "poor" and WR965 was said to have been flying at a low altitude, (one witness claimed that had the aircraft been 2 feet (0.61 m) higher, then it would have cleared the peak easily).

Despite the remote landscape, emergency services and members of the public were quickly on the scene, but the first police officer said "We came across debris and then some bodies and we knew it was really bad. Helicopters arrived from Lossiemouth and it was a very, very busy scene. We could only account for nine from the plane and some of us were sent to the back of the hill to see if someone had survived and had walked off in a daze. We were later told there was nobody alive."

== Crew ==
A normal operational sortie for a Shackleton in the AEW role, consisted of a crew of nine; a pilot, a co-pilot, a flight engineer and a navigator (plotter) who made up the flight deck crew, and a radar team of five. The radar team consisted of a Tactical Co-ordinator (TACO), always a commissioned officer, and a mixture of controllers and operators. The team could be drawn from any of the radar trades established on the sqn (radar navigator, air electronics officer and operator, fighter controller officer or NCO). As squadron strength reduced in preparation for the replacement of the Shackleton AEW2 by the Sentry AEW 1 (AWACS) crews frequently flew with 4 man radar teams. This was so on the day of the accident, with two station personnel also on board. The aircraft Captain was Wing Commander Stephen Roncoroni, Officer Commanding No. 8 Squadron at the time.

== Aftermath and inquiry ==
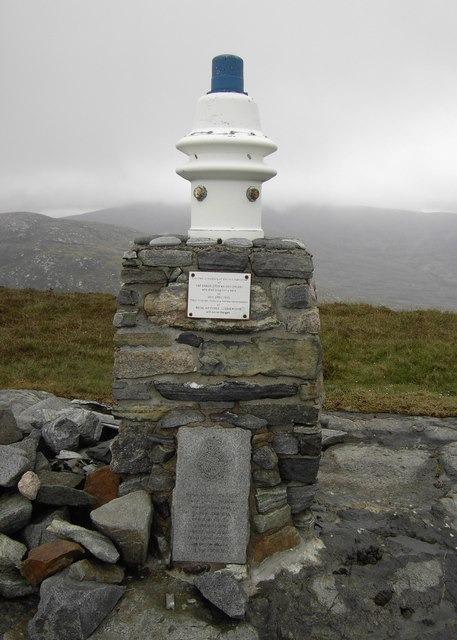
Memorial on Maodal

Two days later, a private notice question in the House of Commons discussed the matter with some stating that cutbacks in the number of aircraft had led to operational inefficiencies. Allan Rogers, then opposition MP for defence, stated that "It is with these cutbacks that we get such tragedies as this. It is a task which has been made extremely difficult in recent years because of cutbacks in operational Shackletons from eleven to six in this squadron."

Three days later, ten coffins were taken across the island to be flown by RAF Hercules, from RAF Stornoway, back to the base at RAF Lossiemouth. More than 2,500 people lined the streets in the Isle of Harris to witness the event. On 31 May 1990, a memorial service was held in one of the hangars that No. 8 Squadron operated from at RAF Lossiemouth.

A Board of Inquiry determined that the Shackleton had its radar turned off as part of the exercise with a Tornado F3 aircraft. It radioed RAF Benbecula for an approach, stating they were 20 miles (32 km) west of the airfield, however, it was determined they were actually 12 miles (19 km) north of Benbecula. At 11:34 am, the crew radioed Benbecula tower to inform them that the weather was too bad for an approach, and that they were turning right and climbing to try again; this was the last transmission from the aircraft before the crash. Benbecula tower asked them to relay their last message again as the transmission was distorted.

The aircraft crashed 30 feet (9.1 m) below the summit with all four engines "developing cruise power" (what is known as Controlled Flight Into Terrain). Meteorological evidence from the day suggests that the cloudbase extended from 200 feet (61 m) above sea level to 3,000 feet (910 m) for the tips of the clouds. The official conclusion of the board of inquiry was;

...that the accident was caused because the aircraft was flown below a safe altitude in unsuitable weather conditions; the board were unable to determine the reasons for this.

The Shackleton fleet was due to be replaced by an upgraded Nimrod variant aircraft, but this was dropped in favour of the Sentry AWACS platform.

A memorial is located on Maodal (at grid reference NF997904) and includes the Orange Harvest ESM receiver that was affixed to the top of WR965 Dylan when it crashed as well as another memorial in the Hebrides People car park at the foot of the Maodal. The crew are remembered on Panel 201 of the Armed Forces Memorial, at the National Memorial Arboretum in Staffordshire.

== Aircraft losses ==
Besides the Shackleton crash, two other RAF aircraft crashed on the same day, though without fatalities. A Tornado GR1 (ZA454) crashed at Goose Bay in Canada after an engine fire, and a Phantom FGR2 (XV402) suffered a damaged wheel and fire on the underside of the aircraft on landing at RAF Valley.
