= Orange Harvest =

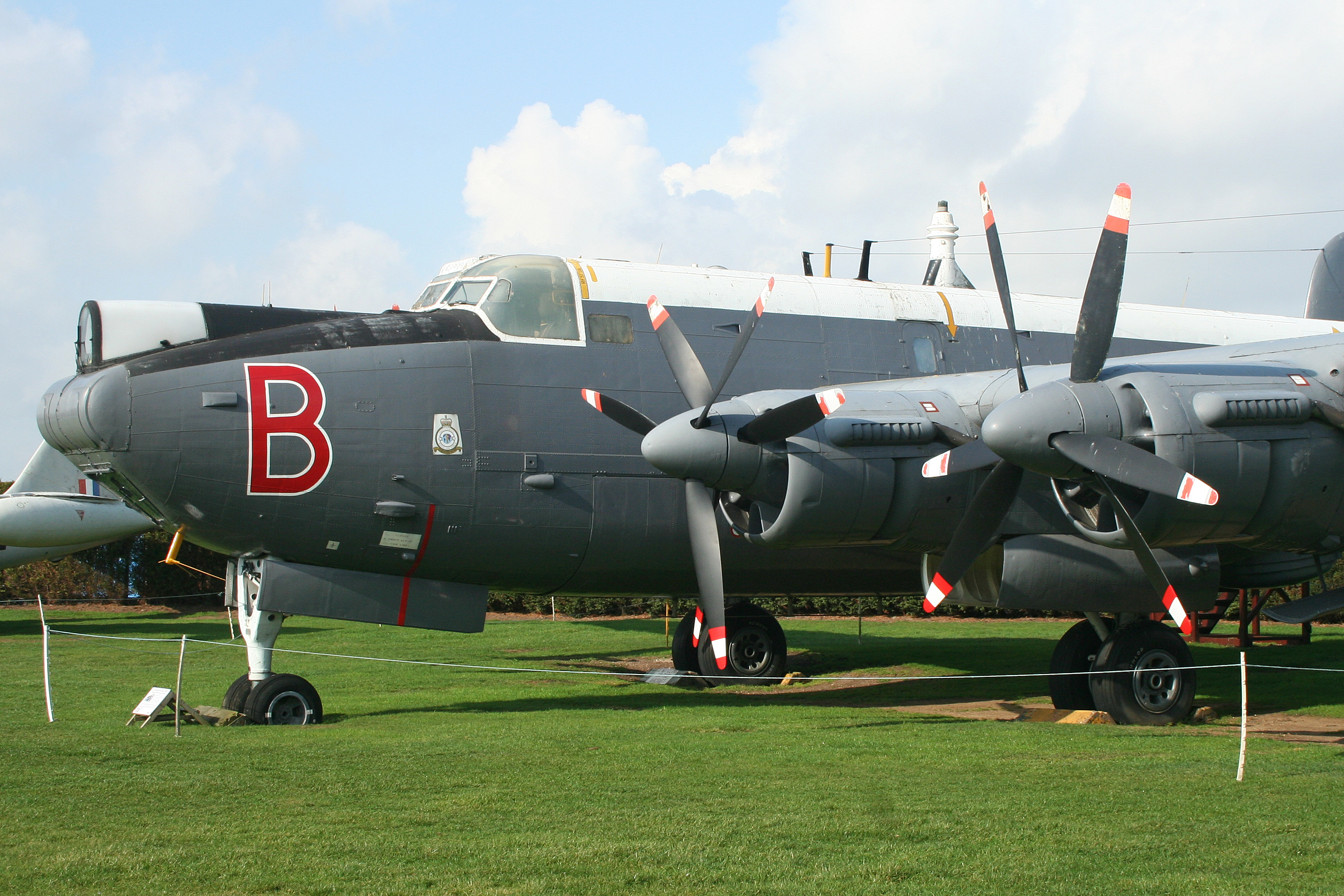
WR977 'B – Basil' at Newark Air Museum. The Orange Harvest "spark-plug" antenna can be seen on the top of the fuselage just to the left of the outboard propeller tips.

Orange Harvest was an ESM receiver fitted to marine patrol Avro Shackletons during the Cold War.

Orange Harvest was an S band and X band radar warning receiver, capable of giving a directional bearing to surface ships or submarines that were transmitting radar emissions. Although less precise than the Shackleton's main ASV.21 search radar, it could give a greater detection range, provided that the target was emitting. As a passive system, it also had the advantage that it did not betray the aircraft's presence to its target. It has been described as, "Probably the most under-rated, and under-used, equipment on board".

A particular target would be the I band (Note: The NATO I band definition overlaps the lower range of the IEEE-defined X band.) RLK-101 Albatros (NATO Snoop Tray) and MRK-50 Snoop Pair radars used by the early Soviet nuclear submarines. As these boats could now run continually submerged, without even needing to snorkel, they were increasingly difficult to detect by previous methods, such as Autolycus or search radar.

Electrically there were two quite separate systems: wide- and narrow band, but sharing the same external antenna housing. The wide band receiver was made by Rank in Plymouth. The wide band aerial components consisted of four "windows" set at 90% to each other. The "windows" were located between the flanges of the aerial. The narrow band aerial was an omni-directional unit located at the very top of the aerial under a black cover. Heating was an integral part of the aerial to prevent build up of ice. The narrow band receiver derived from an early ELINT receiver called 'Breton', developed in Comets by 51 Squadron.

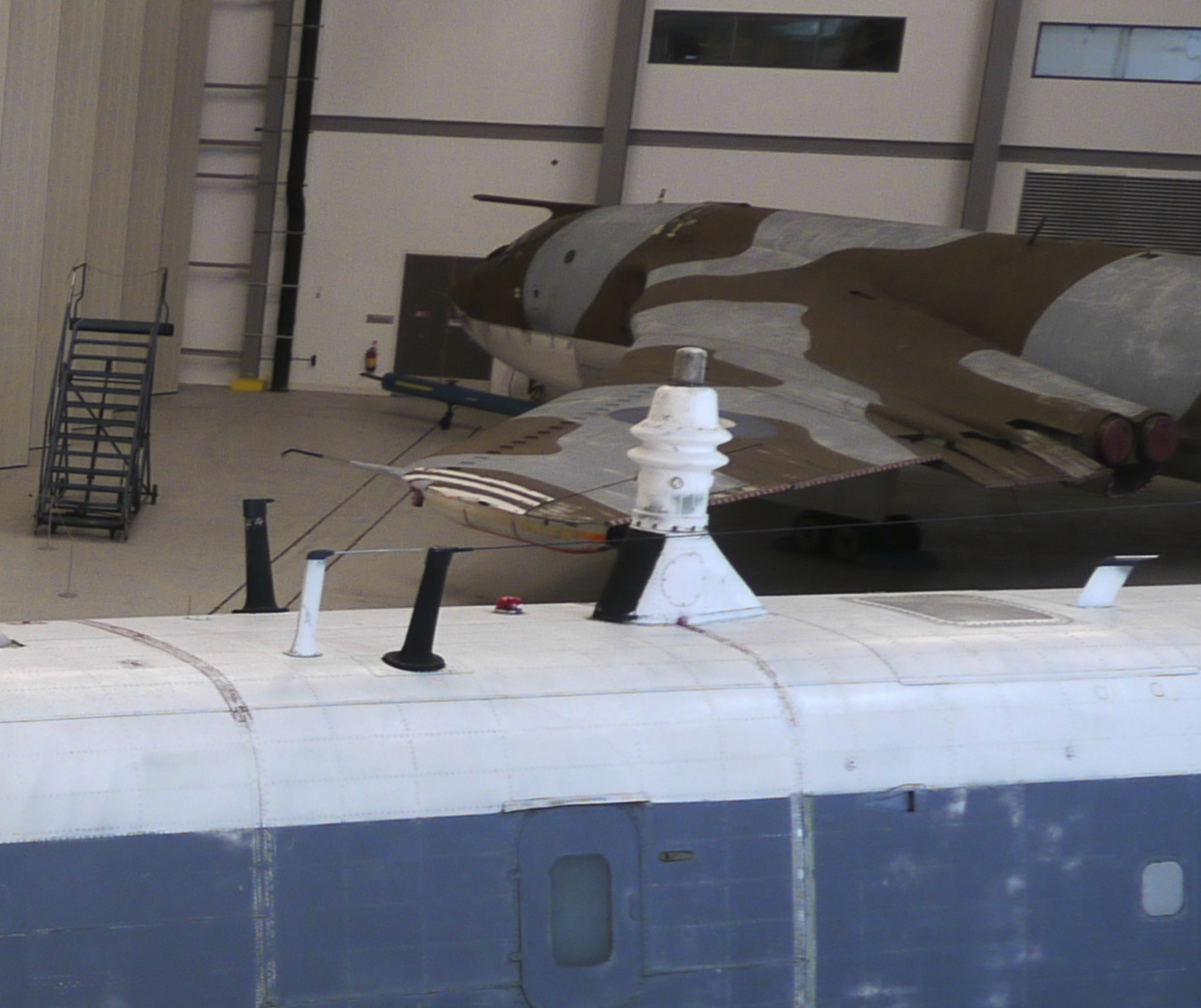
Orange Harvest external antenna of XF708 at Duxford

The external antenna for Orange Harvest was the distinctive white dielectric 'spark plug' carried on the upper surface of the Shackleton. This 'spark plug' has often been mis-identified as an insulator for a HF long-wire antenna running to the aircraft's tail. It is actually self-contained, and at a wavelength far shorter than would use long wires. The Shackleton did carry HF antennae, but these were supported by two small metal masts, just ahead of Orange Harvest. The structural fitment for Orange Harvest was a metal plinth built into the fuselage, at approximately the previous dorsal turret position. The large antenna was fastened to this. There were two different antennae, one for each band, the smaller unit was for "X band" fit, a change from one band to another meant an aerial change as well as some components of the narrow band LRU's. As the antenna causes significant drag, it was sometimes removed and only the plinth was evident. This was more common in the 1960s ASW era, rather than the later AEW period.

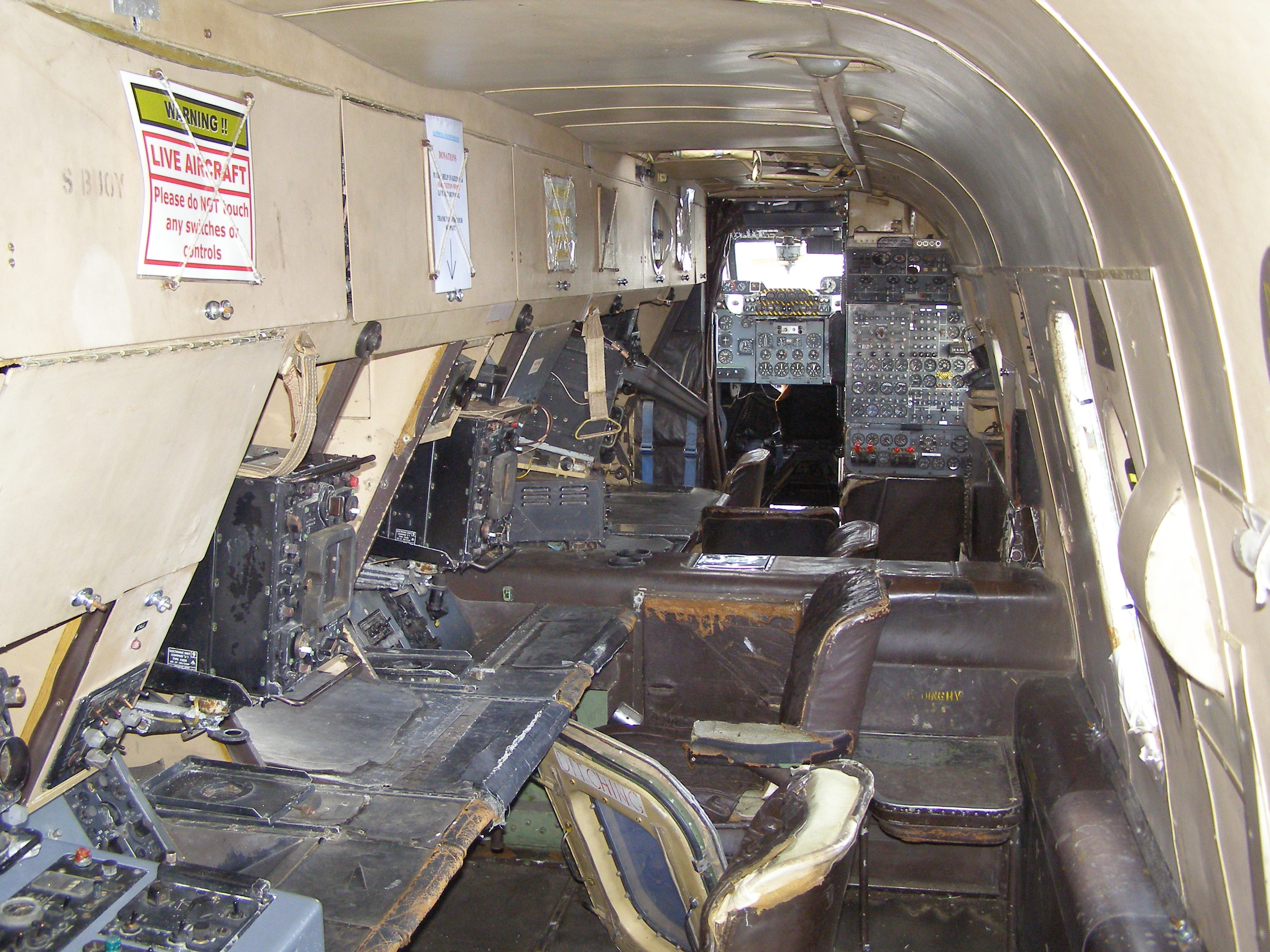
Shackleton interior and operator positions. Orange Harvest is at the very far left

The interior display for Orange Harvest was a 3" cathode ray tube, in front of the C operator, and potentially distracting to them.

Orange Harvest was introduced with the Shackleton MR.3 Phase II in 1961. After the replacement of Shackleton with Nimrod MR.1 in the ASW role, Orange Harvest continued with the Shackleton AEW.2 aircraft of 8 Squadron RAF from 1972 to 1991.

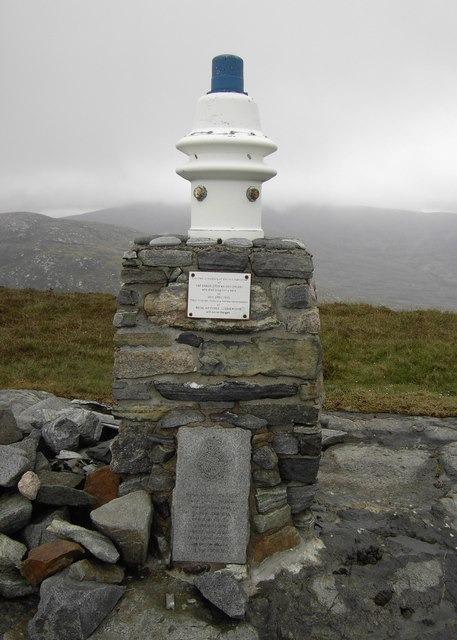
Memorial cairn to WR965 on the Isle of Harris

The Orange Harvest antenna of AEW.2 WR965 Dylan forms part of the memorial cairn to the 1990 crash on the Isle of Harris.

== See also ==
- List of Rainbow Codes
- Soviet military radars
- Autolycus (submarine detector)
