= Meredale =

- Location within Gauteng Location within South Africa
- Coordinates: 26.273°S 27.977°E
- Country: South Africa
- Province: Gauteng
- Municipality: City of Johannesburg
- Main Place: Johannesburg

Area
  - Total: 2.45 km^{2} (0.95 sq mi)

Population (2011)
  - Total: 6,227
  - Density: 2,540/km^{2} (6,580/sq mi)

Racial makeup (2011)
  - Black African: 70.6%
  - Coloured: 19.3%
  - Indian/Asian: 4.4%
  - White: 4.5%
  - Other: 1.1%

First languages (2011)
  - English: 30.2%
  - Zulu: 20.2%
  - Sotho: 12.2%
  - Tswana: 9.3%
  - Other: 28.1%
- Time zone: UTC+2 (SAST)
- Postal code (street): 2091

Meredale is a suburb of Johannesburg, South Africa. It is located in Region F of the City of Johannesburg Metropolitan Municipality, just south of Southgate.
