= British Aerospace Nimrod AEW3 =

Cancelled Airborne Early Warning aircraft project

Nimrod AEW3
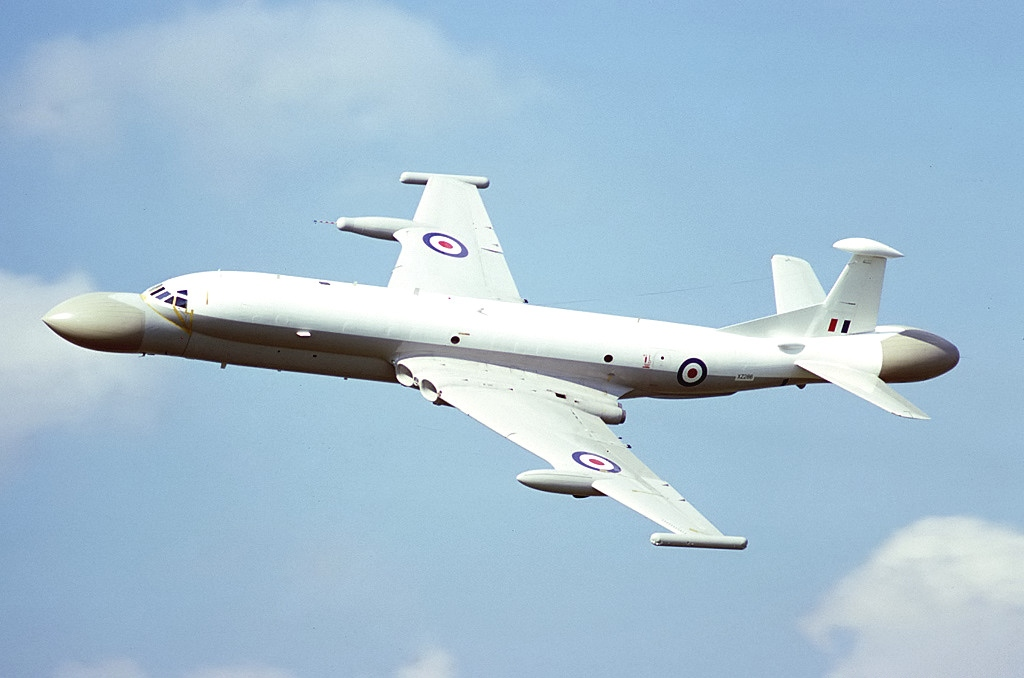
- Nimrod AEW3

General information
- Type: Airborne early warning and control
- National origin: United Kingdom
- Manufacturer: British Aerospace
- Status: Development cancelled
- Primary user: Royal Air Force
- Number built: 3 prototype 8 production (all converted from MR1)

History
- Introduction date: 1984
- First flight: 16 July 1980
- Retired: 1986
- Developed from: Hawker Siddeley Nimrod

The British Aerospace Nimrod AEW3 was a proposed airborne early warning (AEW) aircraft which was to provide airborne radar cover for the air defence of the United Kingdom by the Royal Air Force (RAF). The project was designed to use the existing Nimrod airframe, in use with the RAF as a maritime patrol aircraft, combined with a new radar system and avionics package developed by Marconi Avionics.

The Nimrod AEW project proved to be hugely complex and expensive as a result of the difficulties of producing new radar and computer systems and integrating them successfully into the Nimrod airframe. The project was eventually cancelled, with the RAF instead purchasing new build Boeing E-3 Sentry aircraft to fulfil the AEW requirement.

== Development ==
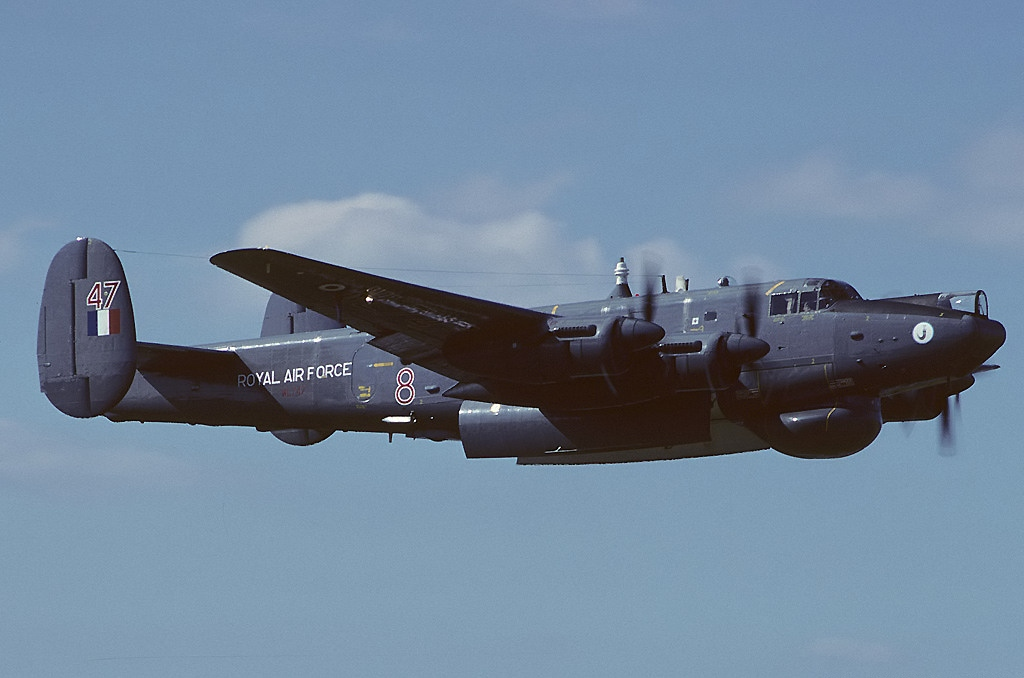
As an interim measure during the development of the Nimrod AEW, surplus Shackletons were fitted with equipment from ex-Royal Navy Gannets.

=== Background ===
In the mid 1960s, following the development of the Grumman E-2 Hawkeye carrier-borne AEW aircraft and its associated systems, the British government began looking for a radar system that could provide airborne early warning for the United Kingdom. At the time, the only recognised AEW aircraft in British service was the Fairey Gannet aircraft used by the Fleet Air Arm on board Royal Navy aircraft carriers. These were fitted with the AN/APS-20 Radar, which had been developed during World War II and was rapidly becoming obsolete. Work had been started in the early 1960s on a brand new AEW platform for the Royal Navy to replace the Gannet that would encompass both a new type of radar system mounted on a new aircraft, the P.139. While the defence cuts of the mid-1960s led to the cancellation of the P.139, work continued on a British designed radar system. Meanwhile, it was decided that the RAF needed an AEW aircraft to operate as part of the national air defence strategy.

To fulfill the planned requirements for a new AEW aircraft, the government had a number of factors to consider:

- The Frequency Modulated Interrupted Continuous Wave (FMICW) radar initially proposed for the P.139 and intended for the RAF's new aircraft would not operate effectively near propellers, meaning a jet aircraft would be needed.
- The size of antennas needed for the required scanning range, together with the fairly large mission crew, meant that a large aircraft was required.

Designers at Hawker Siddeley Aviation came up with a proposal that would see the FMICW radar system installed using a Fore Aft Scanner System in the new Nimrod aircraft. This proposal was rejected as being too expensive, with instead a proposal to convert surplus Andover transport aircraft. This was also rejected due to the potential cost of development.

In the interim, to provide a land based AEW aircraft, radar systems from withdrawn Royal Navy Gannets were installed in similarly surplus Avro Shackleton maritime patrol aircraft and entered service from 1972. Around the same time, it was decided not to proceed with FMICW technology as the basis of an AEW system, as research from the United States Air Force (USAF) had shown that pulse-Doppler radar was superior and would be used in the Boeing E-3 Sentry then under development. As a consequence, the idea of a new land-based AEW aircraft for the RAF was re-examined, and again it was decided that the Nimrod met the requirements.

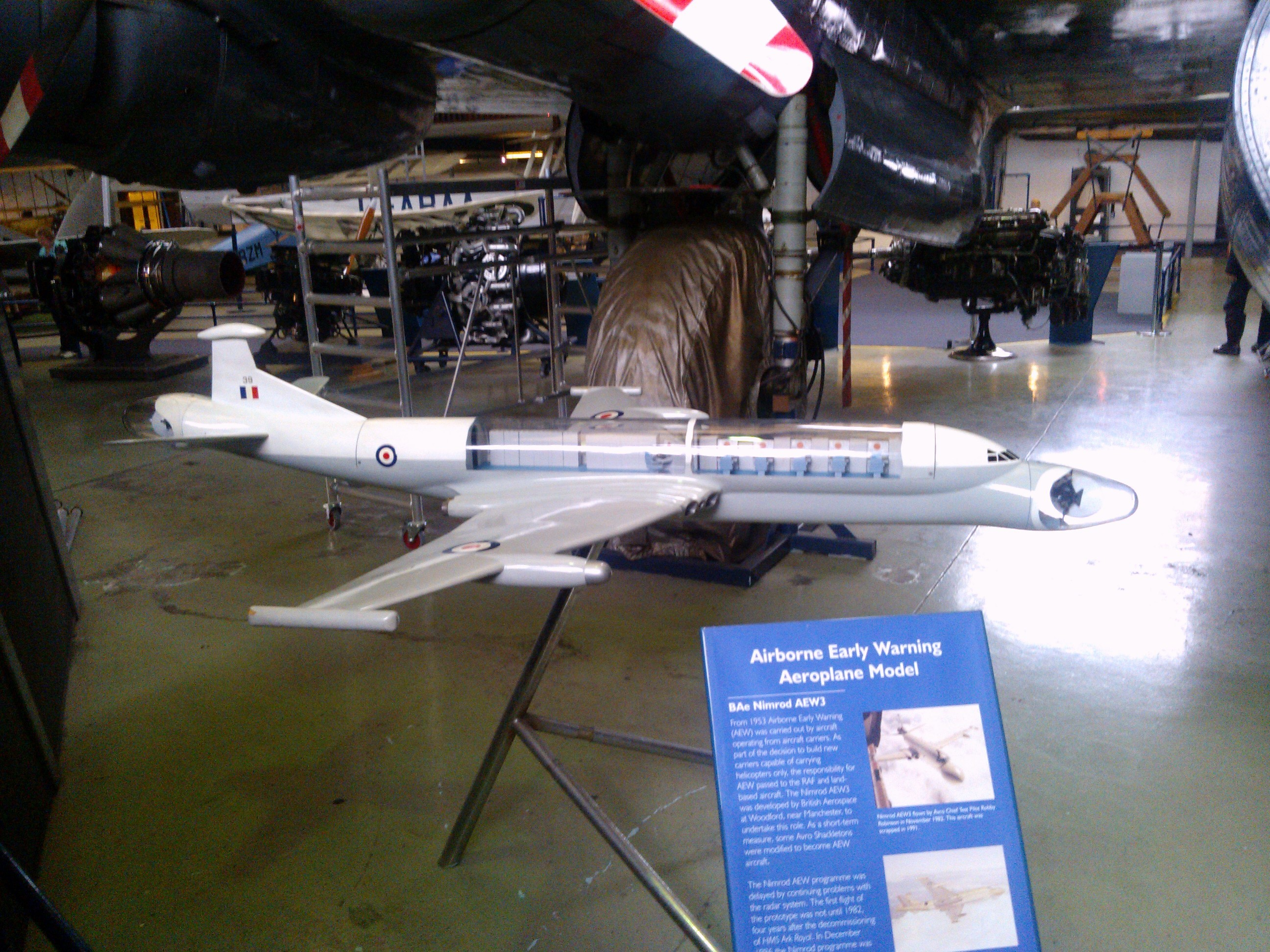
Manufacturer's model of Nimrod AEW

The decision was taken to procure the aircraft fitted with a pulse-Doppler radar system, which then proceeded to a range of options:

1. Purchase the AN/APS-125 pulse-Doppler radar system and its associated avionics, as fitted to the E-2 Hawkeye, and fit them into the Nimrod.
2. Purchase the AN/APS-125 radar and combine it with a British avionics package.
3. Purchase the rotodome and antenna from the E-2 and combine with a British radar transmitter, receiver and avionics package.
4. Develop a wholly British radar system and avionics package using a Fore Aft Scanner System (FASS) rather than the E-2 radome.

The fourth option would maintain both employment and Britain's position at the forefront of radar technology and development; however it was also riskier than purchasing an "off the shelf" product or spreading the risk across multiple partners. In 1977, the US had made an offer to NATO for purchasing several of the new E-3 Sentry aircraft, which were being delivered to the USAF; this was intended to provide airborne early warning cover for Europe's NATO nations without having to rely on the United States, and eventually came into being as the NATO E-3A Component, which was planned to be stationed in the United Kingdom. However, the complex multi-lateral negotiations eventually led the United Kingdom to pursue the all-British development.

=== Development issues ===
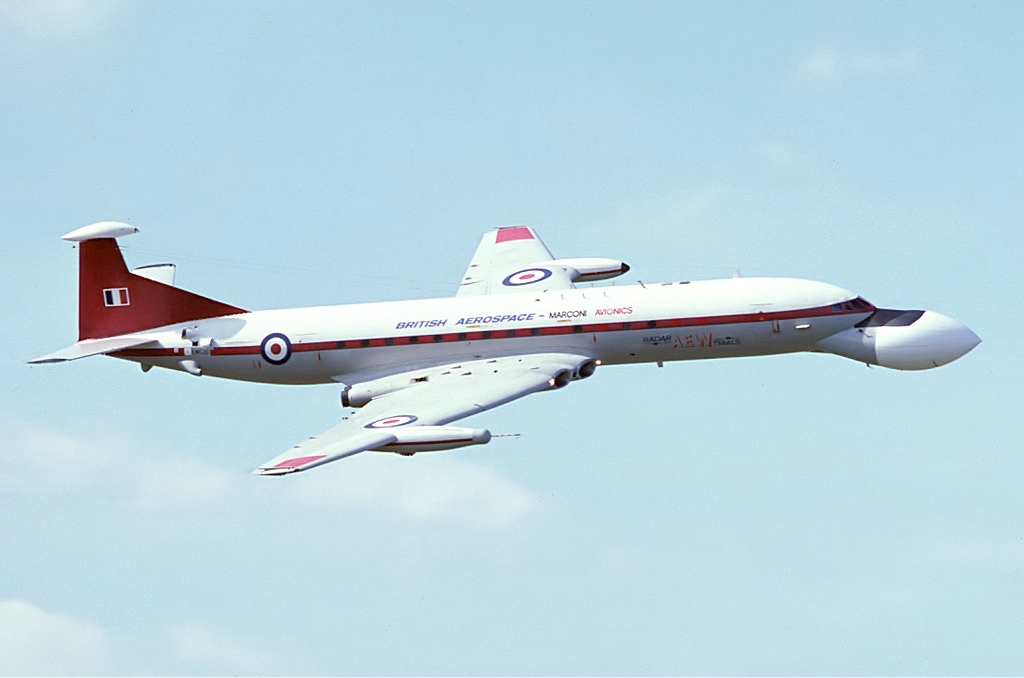
A Comet 4 was fitted with a nose radome for initial aerodynamic flight testing

The complexity of the AEW requirement proved too much for British industry to overcome by itself. A major project management issue was the appointment of British Aerospace (BAe) and GEC Marconi as joint programme leaders. This meant in practice that as development issues arose, the companies had a distressing tendency to blame each other for the problem rather than try to resolve it; while BAe was able to fulfil its part of the contract by delivering the aircraft on time (the first was due to be delivered in 1982, with full delivery by 1984), GEC was unable to solve the difficulties in developing the avionics.

In 1977 an RAF Comet 4 was modified for flight testing with the nose radome and conducted a series of trials, the results of which proved promising enough for an order for three prototype Nimrods to be built using redundant MR1 airframes. The first of these was rolled out in March 1980 and flew for the first time in July, and was intended to test the flight characteristics, with the second airframe planned to carry out trials of the Mission Systems Avionics (MSA) package.

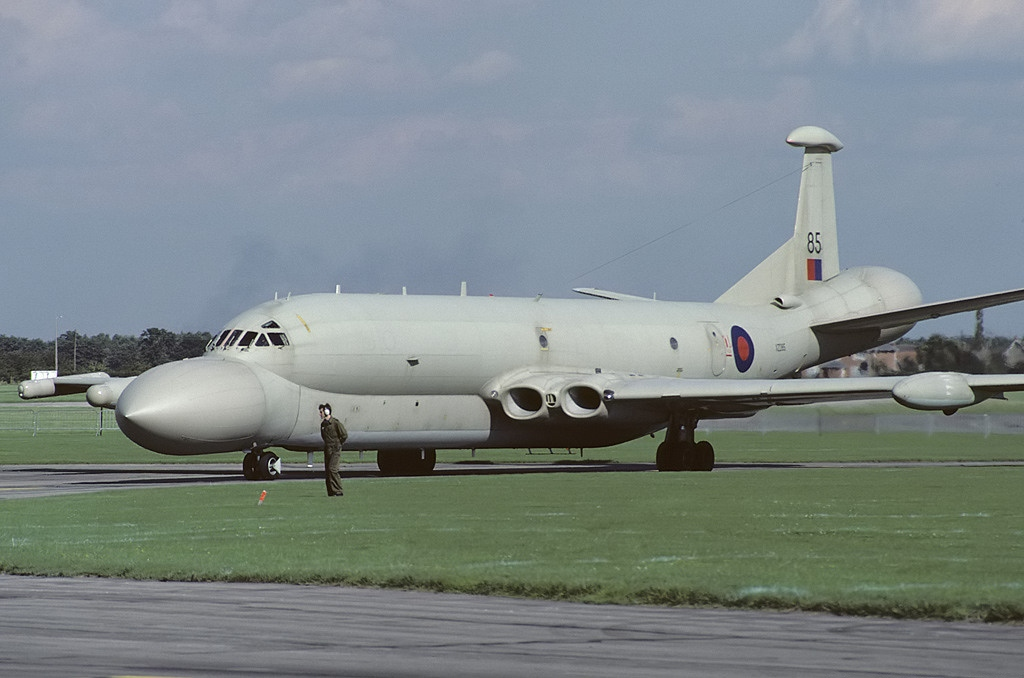
Nimrod AEW.3 at RAF Finningley in 1985

Despite the problems, the project continued, and 8 production aircraft were ordered (which would also come from spare MR1 airframes). The first of these flew in March 1982. Even while the technical problems were being worked on, the aircraft was delivered to the RAF's No 8 Squadron in 1984 to begin crew training. The technical problems proved insurmountable for the Nimrod AEW to be deployed in the Falklands War. To provide some degree of cover, several Nimrod MR.2 were quickly modified to undertake the airborne surveillance role for the task force however.

==== Aircraft ====
The choice of the Nimrod airframe proved to be the wrong one, as it was too small to accommodate the radar, electronics, power generation and cooling systems needed for a system as complex as the one required – at just over 38.5 m (126 ft), the Nimrod was close to 8 m (26 ft) shorter than the Boeing 707 aircraft that formed the basis of the E-3 Sentry, with the planned all-up weight around half that of the American aircraft, but was expected to accommodate sufficient crew and equipment to perform a similar function. Nimrod was designed to have a total of six operator consoles (4 for the radar, one for ESM and one for communications), which was less than the nine stations fitted aboard the E-3A. The size of the Sentry also meant there was room to increase the number of operators. Having the Sentry's radar in the rotodome above the aircraft allowed for cooling to be undertaken directly by the airflow, with cooling doors mounted in the installation, while the transmitter had a separate liquid cooling system, and the avionics in the main section were sufficiently cooled by a conventional air cycle environmental system. This was in contrast to the Nimrod's "heat sink" design that dispersed the heat through the fuel system, and which needed the fuel tanks to be at least half-full to work efficiently when the aircraft's system operated at full power.

==== Avionics ====
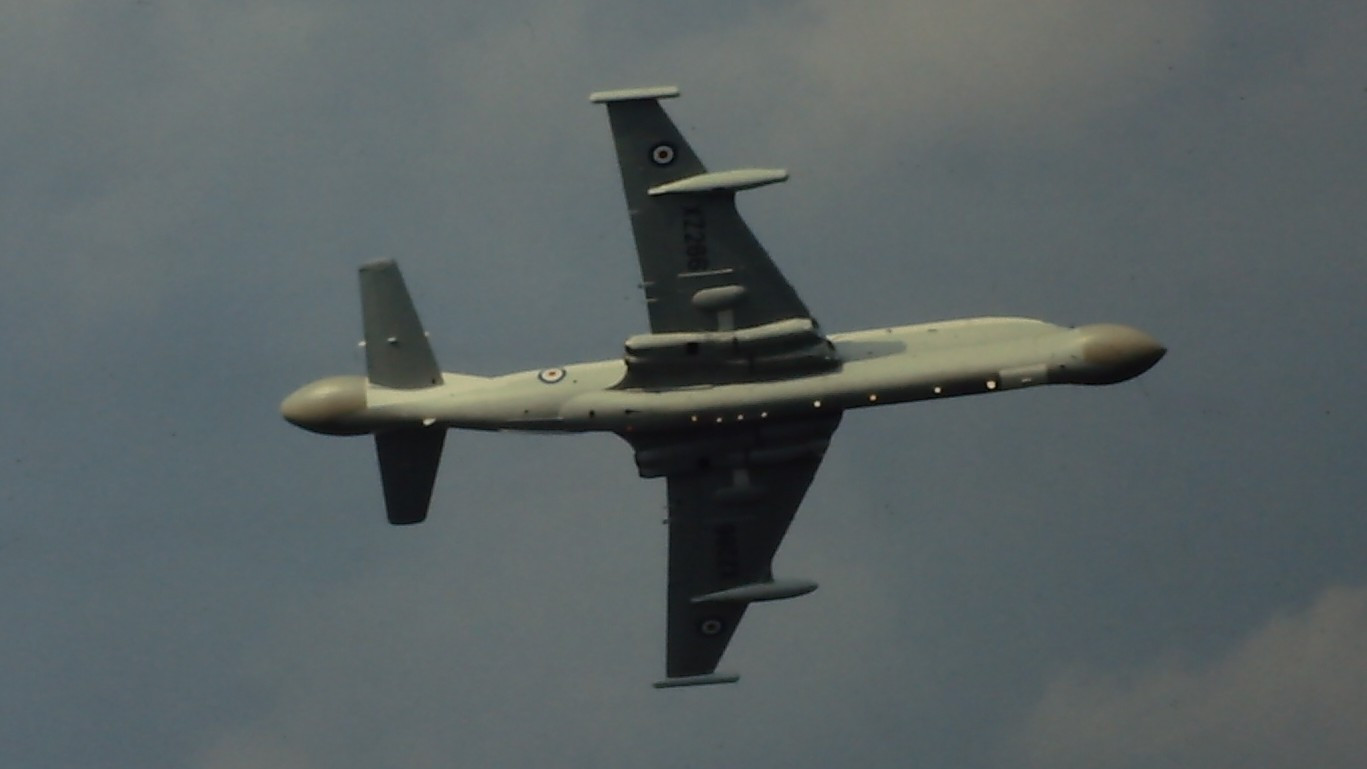
Even getting the radar scanners mounted on the Nimrod's nose and tail to synchronise proved problematic

The MSA was based around a GEC 4080M computer, which was required to process data from the two radar scanners, the ESM system, IFF and inertial navigation systems. The integration of all of these systems into a single package proved too difficult for the underpowered computer, which had an ultimate data storage capacity of 2.4 MB. By the time of the project's cancellation, the mission system mean time between failure was around two hours, yet it took around two and a half hours to load all the mission data via a tape system.

What mission performance there was largely due to the Cossor IFF interrogator which complemented the radar system: with the addition of IFF data, the system could successfully track aircraft carrying IFF transponders, but when the IFF was switched off, radar tracks would rapidly be lost. This meant that the system would successfully track civil and 'friendly' military aircraft, but would not reliably detect Warsaw Pact aircraft which did not carry a compatible IFF system – detection of which was the whole point of the project.

The mission system electronic racks were earthed to different points on the airframe, which led to differences in earth potential and the introduction of short-lived, random track information which added to the computer overload. Finally, the advanced design of the radar proved difficult – the FASS method to gain full 360° radar coverage was problematic, involving as it did the scanner in the nose making a left to right sweep, with the signal then immediately passed to the scanner in the tail, which would sweep right to left. However, getting the two scanners to synchronise proved difficult, resulting in poor all-round surveillance capability. The system also split incoming raw radar information into upper and lower beams, each of which was then further split into in-phase and quadrature-phase channels. Each of these 4 channels contained identical individual elements (such as a spectrum analyser), which in theory should have been entirely interchangeable between locations.

Joint Trials Unit (JTU) testing showed that in fact the system would only work with a particular device in a particular place in the system: putting the same device in one of the other 3 channels would not give a serviceable system. The consequence of this was that the JTU trials aircraft would fly loaded with spare electronic devices so that when system failure occurred, there was a better chance of finding a particular combination of system elements which would work. This would not have been a sustainable practice had the aircraft entered service. The reason for this issue was never resolved: the JTU suspicion was that tolerances in transmitting information through each channel were too loose, so that as the processed information emerged from each channel to be correlated back into a coherent picture, such correlation was in fact impossible since each channel was offering up a different 'time slot' to the others.

=== Cancellation ===
"...The choice of national procurement rather than the available US alternative, involved not only higher costs for Britain but also the lack of an adequate system in-service when needed... It appears that buying British was given a high priority than having a system available to meet the assessed Soviet threat"

— Historians Ron Smith and Jacques Fontanel, discussing the procurement process.

At the time that the first production Nimrods were being delivered to the RAF, the MoD decided to conduct a complete review of the AEW programme. The result of this was the start of a bid process to supply AEW aircraft for the RAF that began in 1986, with a number of different options put forward, including the E-2C Hawkeye, E-3 Sentry, P-3AEW&C Orion, a proposal from Airship Industries, and the Nimrod. Eventually, the Best and Final Offers were sought from GEC Marconi with the Nimrod, and Boeing with its Sentry. In December 1986, the Sentry was finally chosen and the Nimrod AEW programme was cancelled. In spite of the project's difficulties, India expressed interest in procuring the Nimrod AEW3; these investigations continued even after the British government's eventual cancellation of the project.

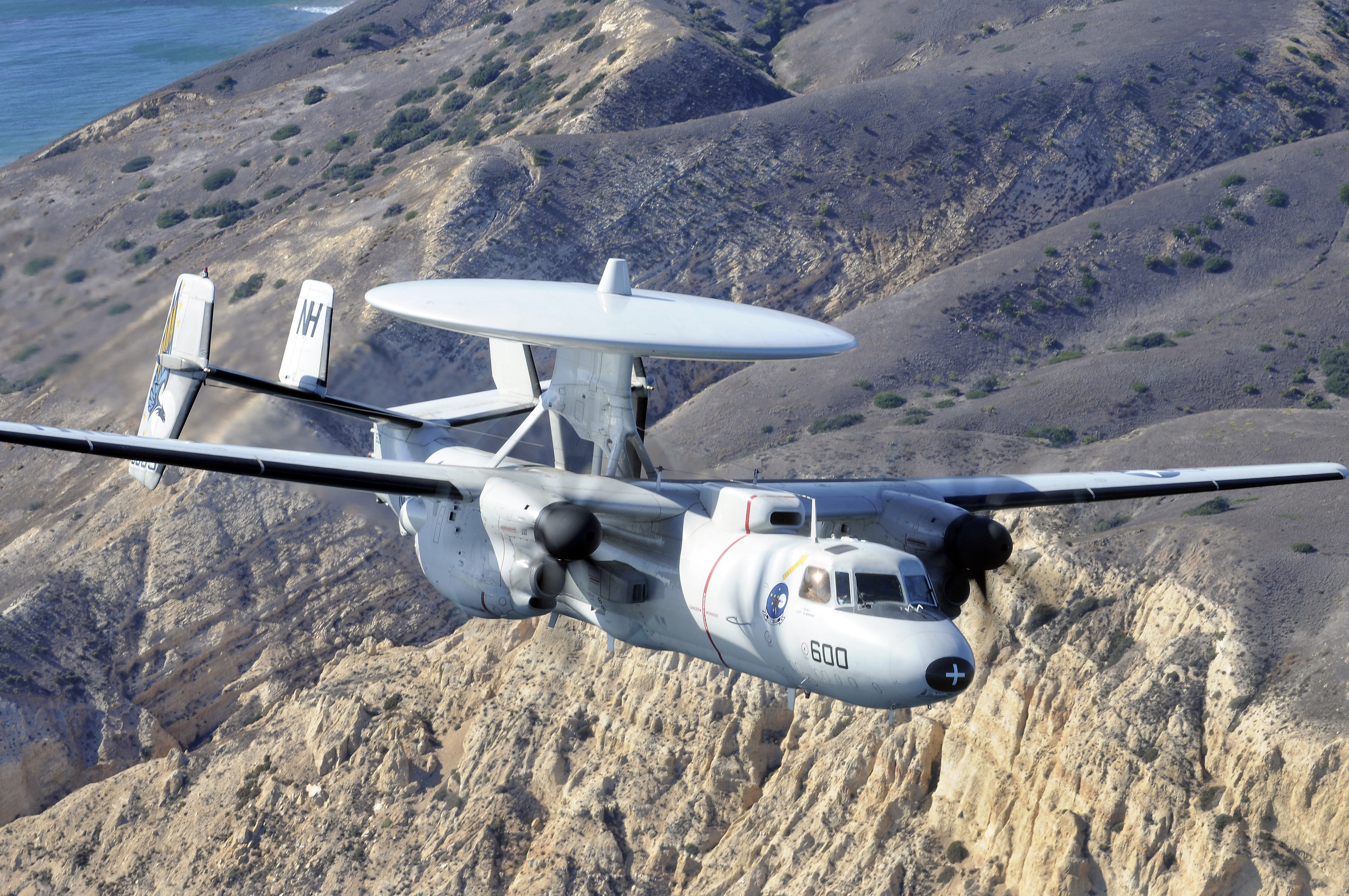
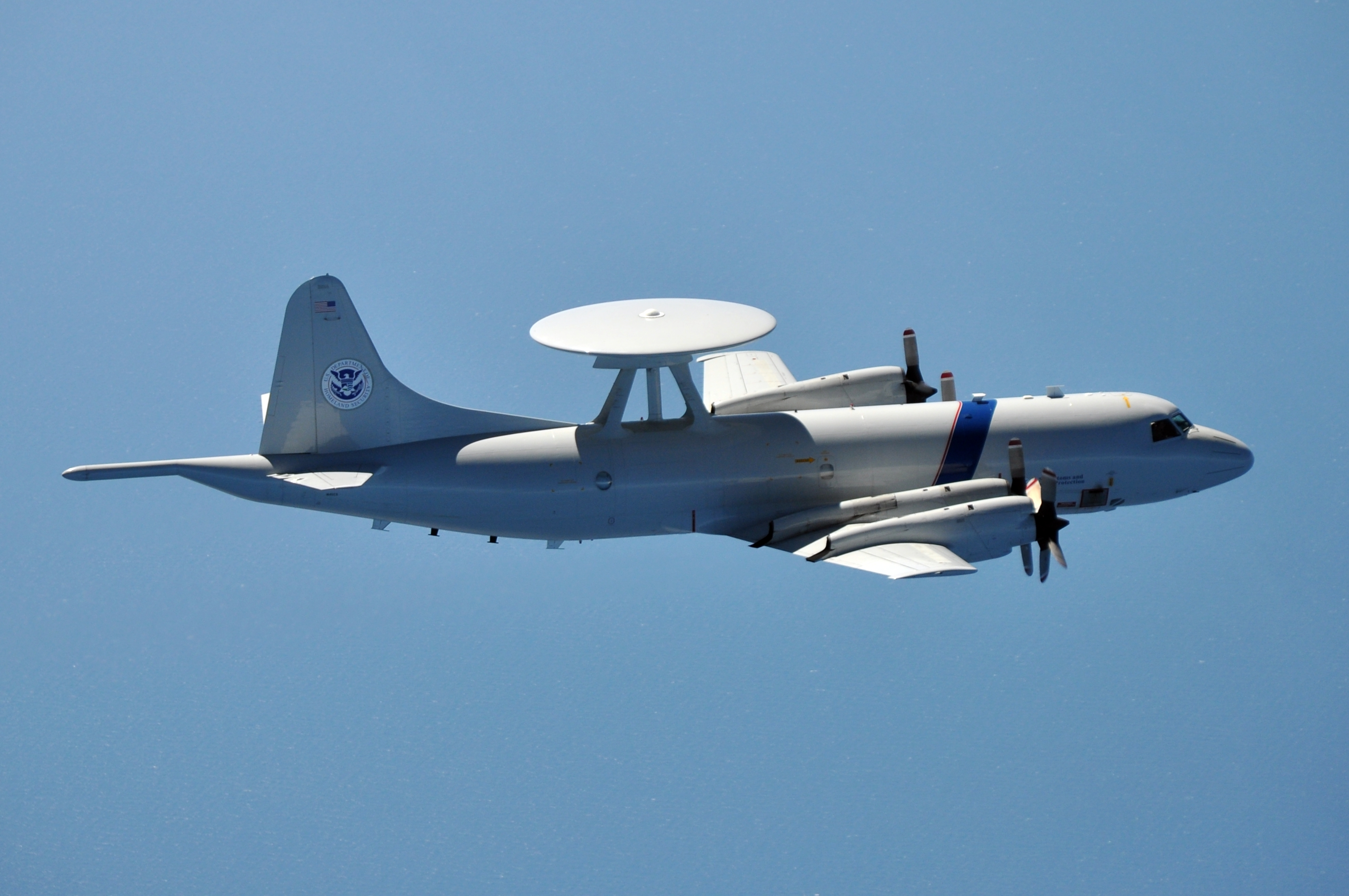
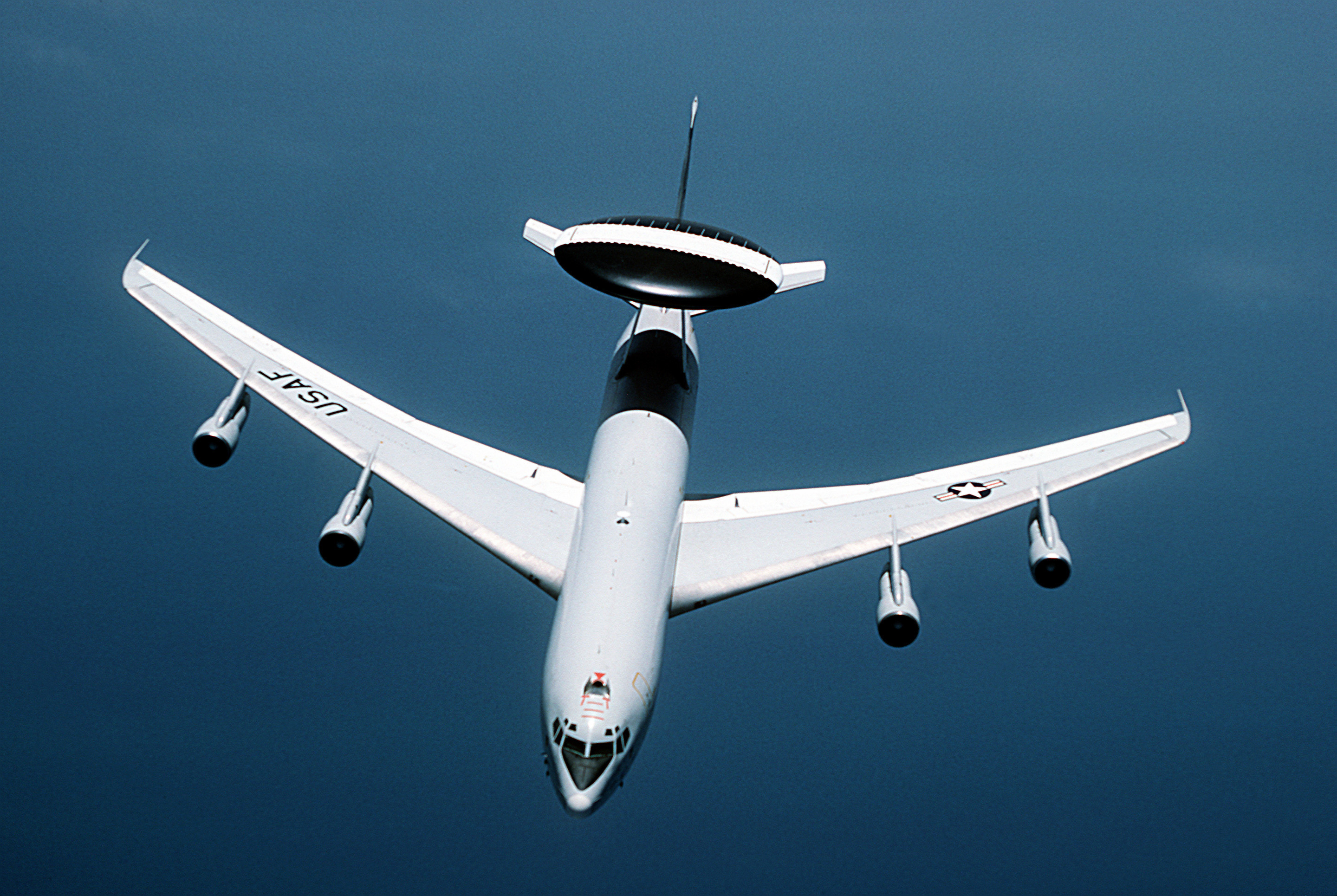
The E-2 Hawkeye, P-3 Orion AEW&C and E-3 Sentry were all considered as alternatives to the Nimrod

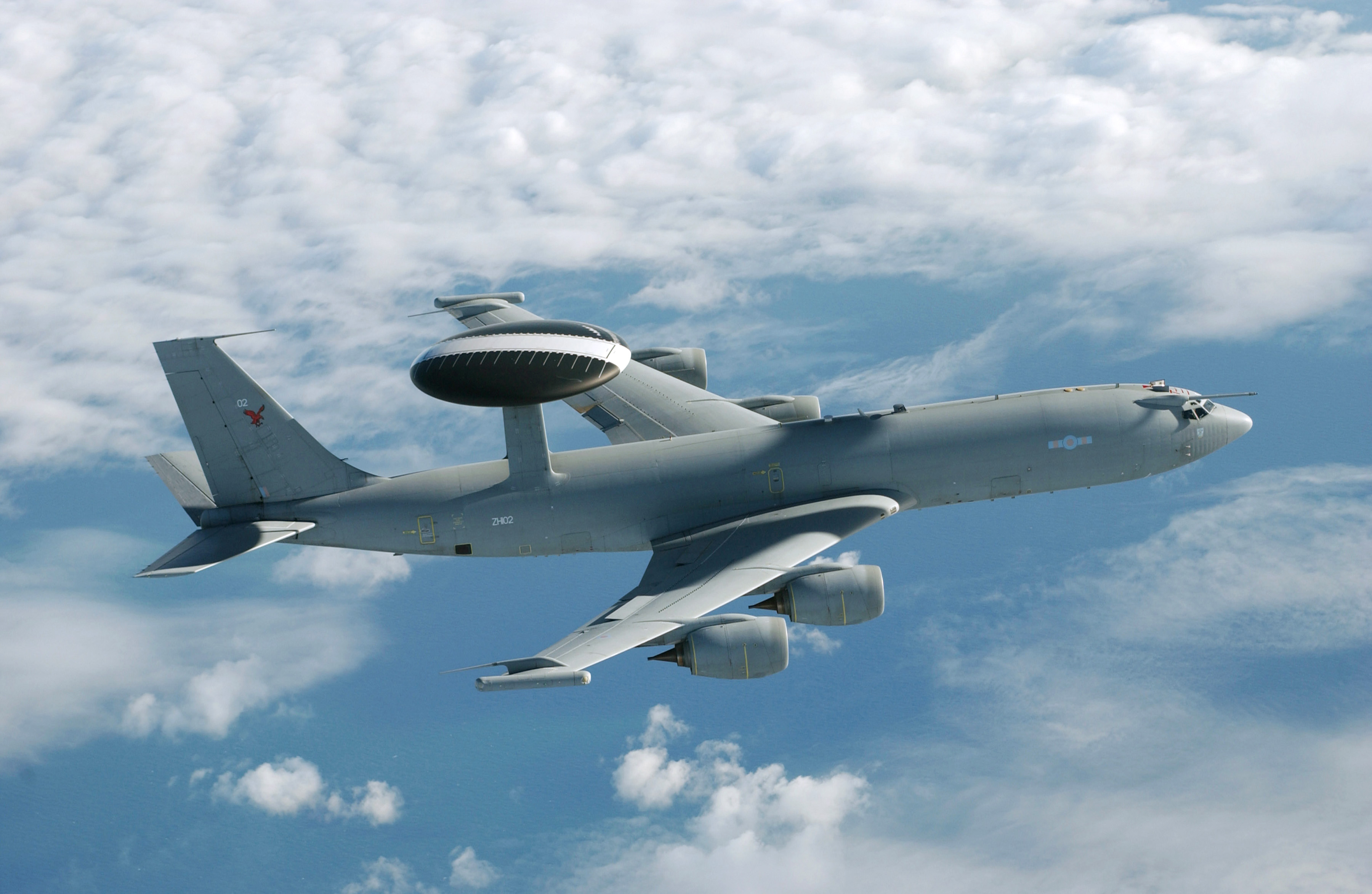
The MoD's review of the AEW programme eventually led to Boeing's E-3 Sentry being chosen instead of the Nimrod.

The Nimrod programme had cost in the region of £1 billion up to its cancellation, contrasting with manufacturer claims in 1977 that the total cost of the project would be between £200–300 million. The unused airframes were eventually stored and used as a source of spares for the Nimrod R1 and MR2 fleets, while the elderly Shackleton aircraft that had been commissioned in 1971 as a "stop-gap" measure for AEW cover until the planned entry of the Nimrod were forced to soldier on until 1991 when they were replaced by the Sentry. The scandal over the collapse of the Nimrod AEW project was a major factor in Prime Minister Margaret Thatcher's stance to open up the UK defence market to competition.

Following the cancellation of the Nimrod AEW programme, BAe began looking at ways that the now redundant airframes could be re-used, and commenced studies looking at the potential use of the Nimrod as a missile carrying strike aircraft. This would have seen the AEW modifications, primarily the FASS scanners, and the fuel and cooling systems installed in the weapons bay, removed. The Searchwater radar, at the time fitted to the Nimrod MR.2, would have been installed in a nose installation, and the weapons bay outfitted to accommodate up to six Sea Eagle anti-ship missiles. However, this did not go beyond the study phase, and the airframes were eventually scrapped during the 1990s.

== Operators ==
United Kingdom

- Royal Air Force
  - Nimrod AEW Joint Trials Unit

== Aircraft on display ==
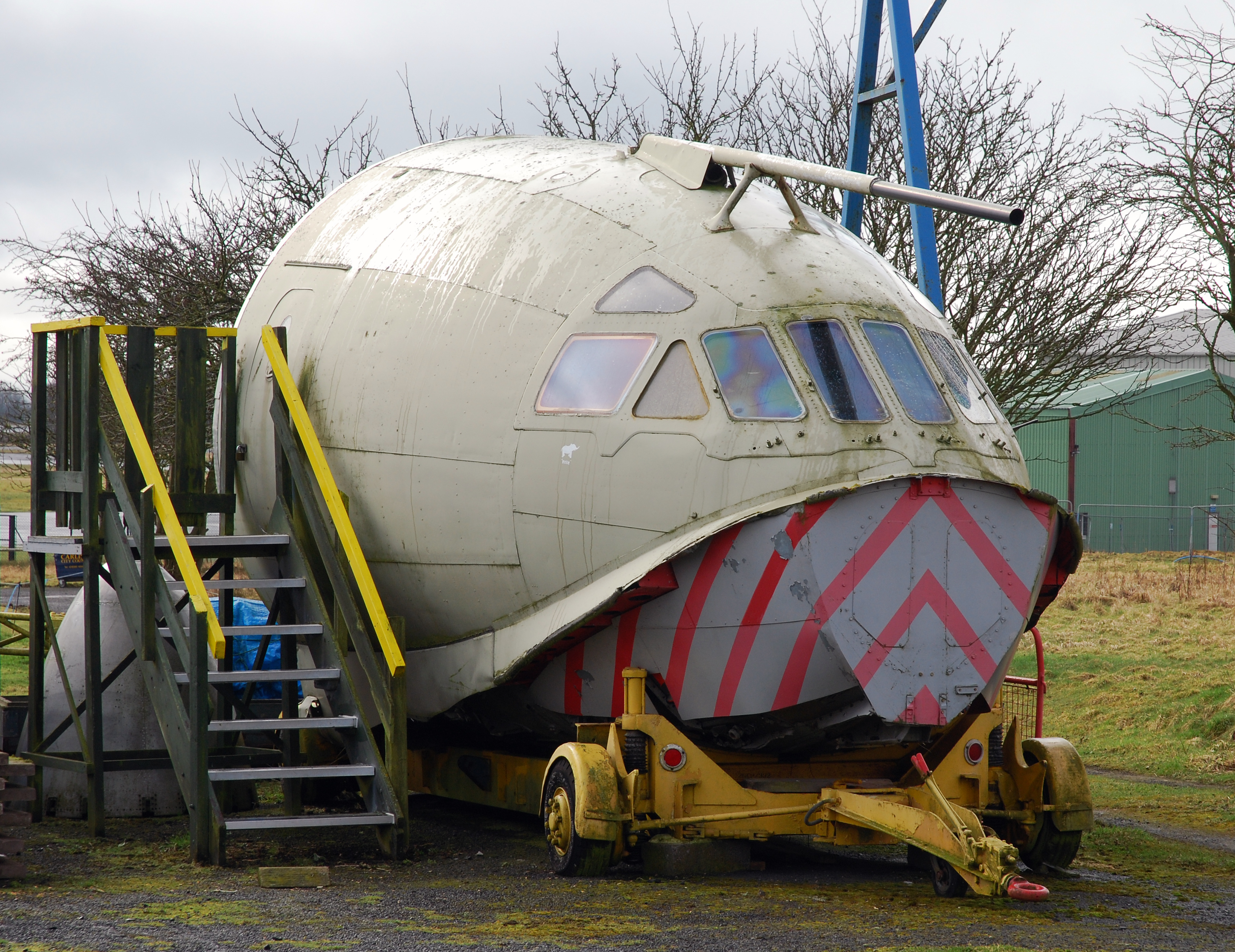
The cockpit of XV259 at Solway Aviation Museum

No complete Nimrod AEW3 survive fully intact, however 3 cockpits/ fuselages are intact

- XV259 - Solway Aviation Museum, Carlisle Airport, Cumbria, England - cockpit only surviving part
- XV263 - Brough, Yorkshire, England - Fuselage used as the fatigue test rig for the Nimrod MRA4 wing.
- XZ287 - Stafford camp, Staffordshire, England - Fuselage only surviving part

== Specifications (Nimrod AEW3) ==
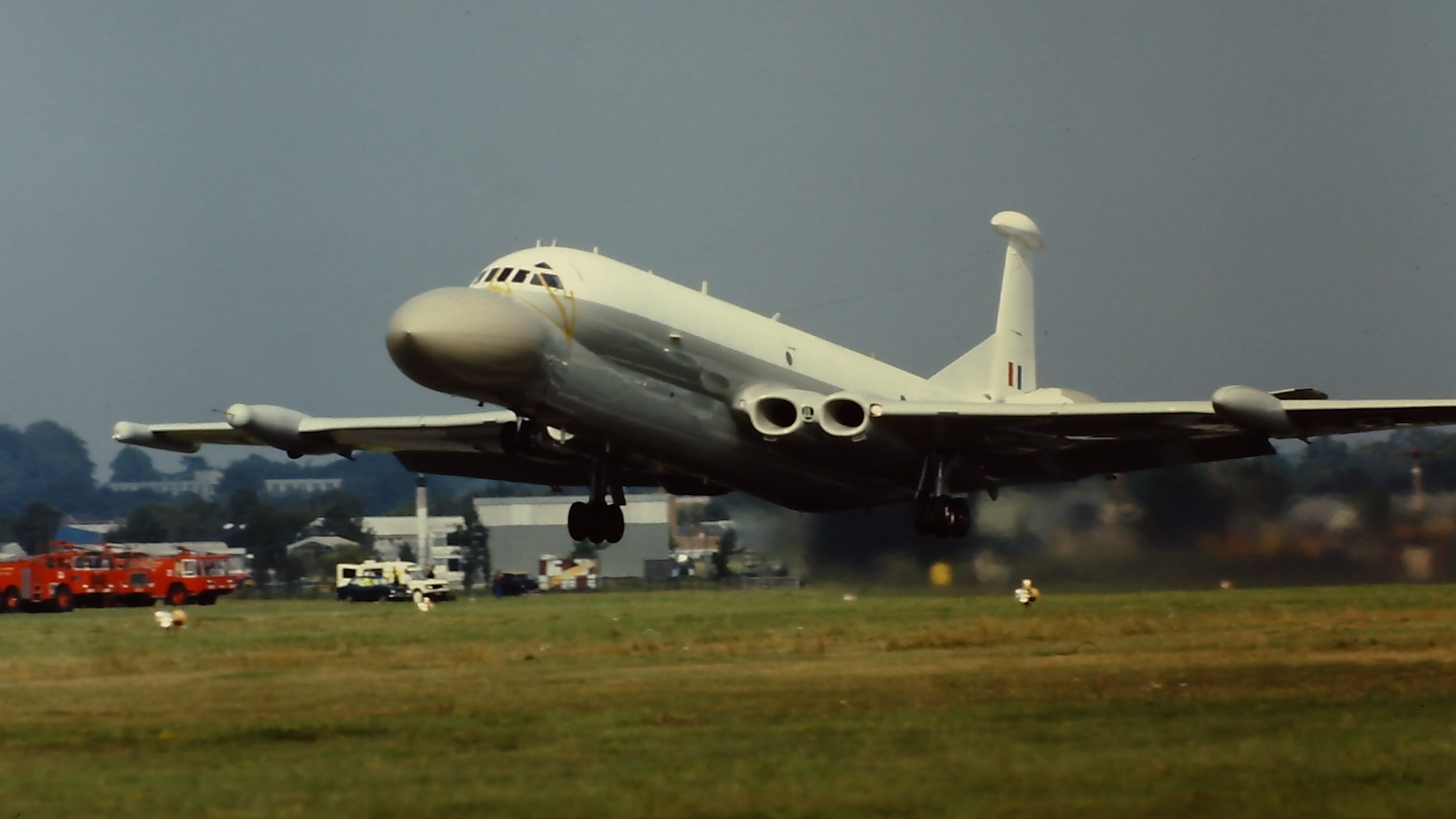
Nimrod AEW3 at the Farnborough Airshow, 1980

Data from Aeroflight – BAE Systems Nimrod

General characteristics

- Crew: up to 12
- Length: 137 ft 8.5 in (41.974 m)
- Wingspan: 115 ft 1 in (35.08 m)
- Height: 35 ft 0 in (10.67 m)
- Wing area: 2,121 sq ft (197.0 m^{2})
- Empty weight: 86,000 lb (39,009 kg)
- Max takeoff weight: 187,800 lb (85,185 kg)
- Powerplant: 4 × Rolls-Royce RB 168-200 turbofan engines, 12,140 lbf (54.0 kN) thrust each

Performance

- Maximum speed: 304 kn (350 mph, 563 km/h)
- Service ceiling: 36,000 ft (11,000 m)

Avionics

- GEC Marconi Argus-2000 Mission Systems Avionics system incorporating:
  - Thorn EMI Skymaster F band pulse doppler air search radar
  - Loral ARI-18240/1 ESM system
  - Cossor Jubilee Guardsman IFF interrogator-responder
  - Ferranti FIN 1012 inertial navigation system

== See also ==
Related development

- BAE Systems Nimrod MRA.4
- British Aerospace Nimrod MR.2
- Hawker Siddeley Nimrod MR.1
- Hawker Siddeley Nimrod R.1

Aircraft of comparable role, configuration, and era

- Avro Shackleton AEW.2
- Beriev A-50 Shmel
- Boeing E-3 Sentry

Related lists

- List of AEW&C aircraft operators
- List of AEW&C aircraft
- List of aircraft of the Royal Air Force
