= Searchwater =

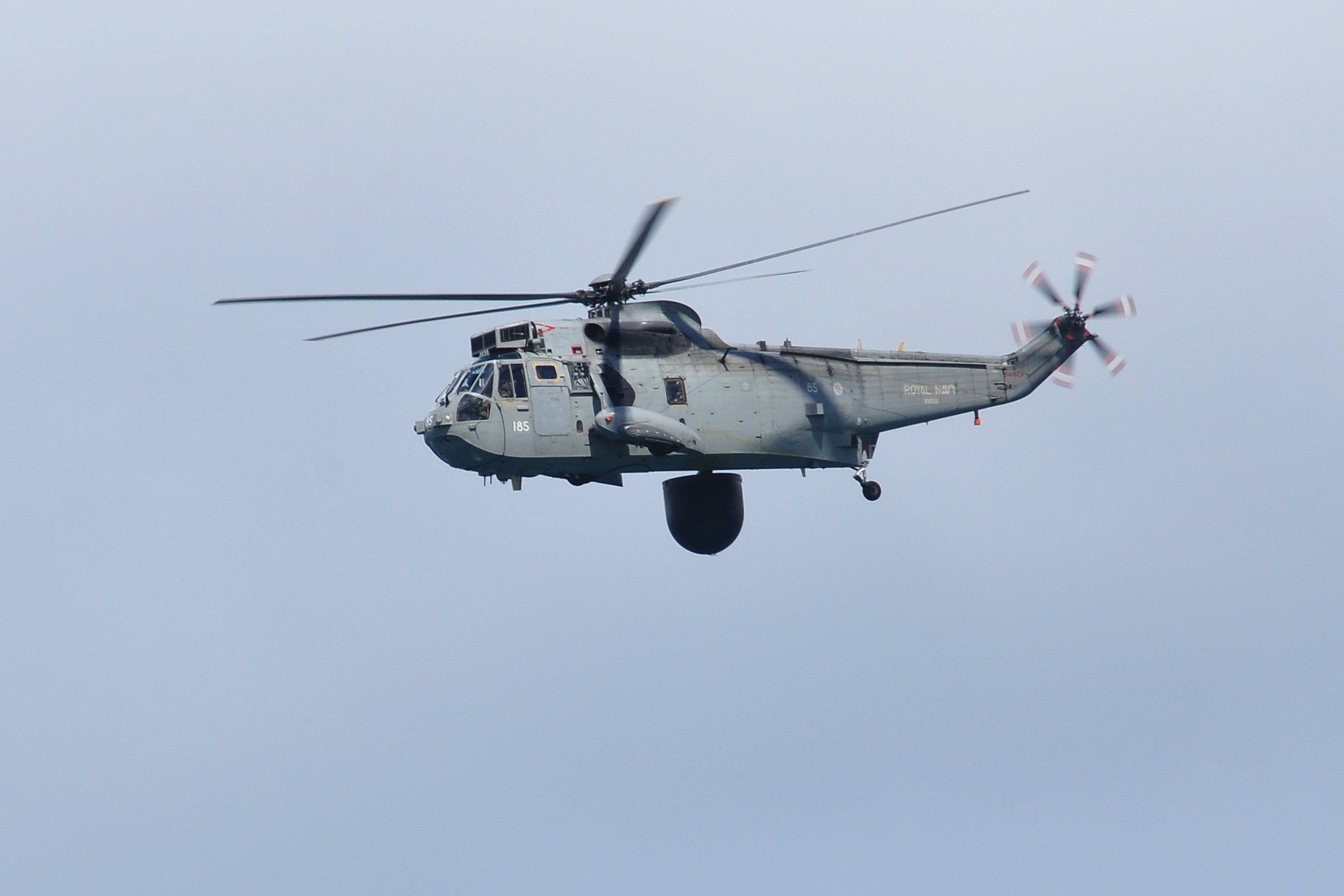
A Sea King helicopter fitted with a Searchwater LAST radar

Searchwater was a maritime surveillance radar developed by Thorn EMI under project P1149. This type of radar has been in service with the Royal Air Force Hawker Siddeley Nimrod aboard the MR2 variant since the 1970s.

The retirement of the Royal Navy's fleet carriers in 1978 meant that the airborne early warning (AEW) capable Fairey Gannet was also withdrawn from service. During the Falklands War, a number of warships were lost due to the lack of an indigenous AEW presence. Consequently, a greatly accelerated project was started to equip Westland Sea King helicopters with a slightly modified version of the system known as Searchwater LAST (Low Altitude Surveillance Task). The radome was mounted in a distinctive inverted cupola on a swivel arm attached to the right side of the fuselage just aft of the main door. This arm allowed the helicopter to lower the radar below the fuselage in flight and to raise it for landing. Searchwater was retired from service when the last of the Royal Navy's airborne early warning Sea King helicopters were taken out of service in 2018. The Searchwater system was subsequently replaced in the Royal Navy by the new Crowsnest system.

Searchwater radar was developed by the Royal Signals and Radar Establishment and EMI (later Thorn Sensors Group). Racal Radar Defence Systems acquired Searchwater in 1995. Thorn and Racal merged to form Racal-Thorn Defence.

== Variants ==
- Searchwater: the first model of the family, basic anti-submarine and anti-surface warfare (ASW/AsuW) radar without air-to-air capability, installed on board Hawker Siddeley Nimrod MR2 ASW aircraft.
- Searchwater AEW: Also known as Searchwater LAST (Low Altitude Surveillance Task), the AEW version for helicopters as a lesson learned from the Falklands War.
- Skymaster: Development of Searchwater AEW/LAST, combining the air-to-surface capability of the original Searchwater and the air-to-air capability of Searchwater AEW/LAST. Developed as the radar for Argus-2000 AEW&C system to be installed on British Aerospace Nimrod AEW3. which was eventually cancelled. However, 6 complete Argus-2000 AEW&C systems plus two more Skymaster radar as spares were purchased by China in 1997 for 66 million US dollars. The experienced gained from Skymaster/Argus-2000 program despite its eventual cancellation has been used in the modernization of other models of Searchwater radars.
- Searchwater 2000: Upgrade package of Searchwater series including the integration of Link 11 and Link 16, faster computers and advanced operator console with coloured display. Installed on Sea King Mk 7 and successfully deployed in Afghanistan with over a thousand missions performed.
- Searchwater 2000 AEW: latest AEW model of Searchwater radars developed from Skymaster and Searchwater 2000, with the incorporation of moving target indication (MTI), compatibility with Link 22, and improved capability in littoral water.
- Searchwater 2000 MR: Intended for the cancelled BAE Systems Nimrod MRA4; it has synthetic aperture radar and inverse synthetic aperture radar modes.
- Searchwater ASaC: Latest member of Searchwater radar family with ground moving target indication capability added, specifically designed for AEW&C applications over land and sea.

== See also ==
- Seaspray (radar)
