= Hawker Siddeley Nimrod =

Maritime patrol aircraft family

Nimrod
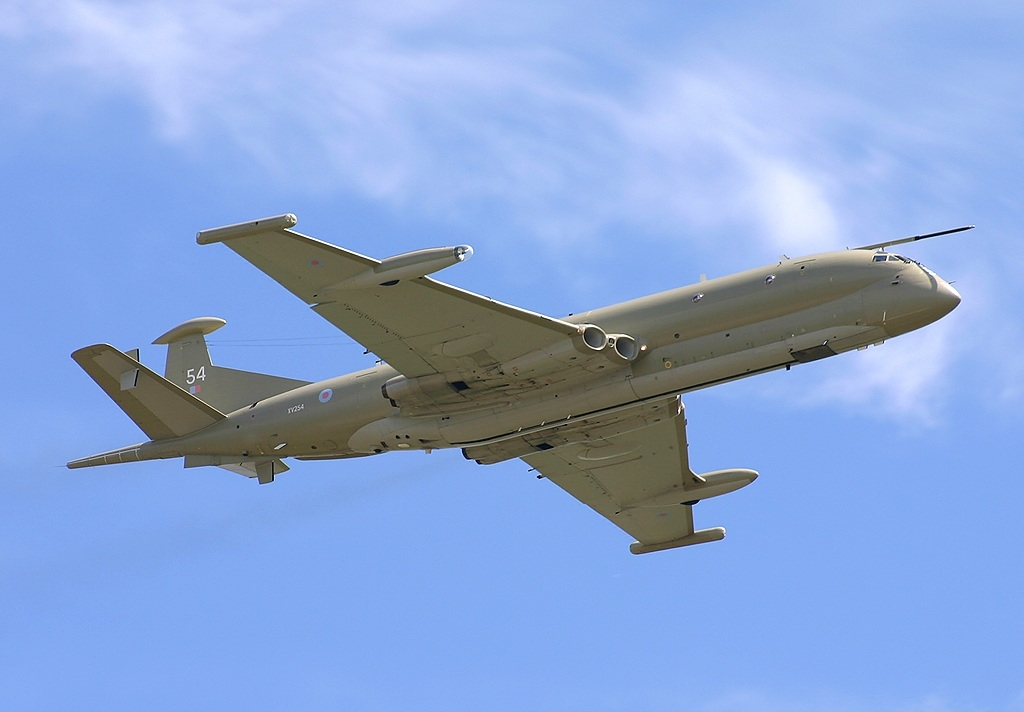
- Hawker Siddeley Nimrod MR.2

General information
- Type: Maritime patrol aircraft
- National origin: United Kingdom
- Manufacturer: Hawker Siddeley; BAE Systems
- Primary user: Royal Air Force
- Number built: 49 (+2 prototypes)

History
- Introduction date: 2 October 1969
- First flight: 23 May 1967
- Retired: 28 June 2011
- Developed from: de Havilland Comet
- Variants: Nimrod R.1; Nimrod AEW.3; Nimrod MRA.4

The Hawker Siddeley Nimrod is a retired maritime patrol aircraft developed and operated by the United Kingdom. It was an extensive modification of the de Havilland Comet, the world's first operational jet airliner. It was originally designed by de Havilland's successor firm, Hawker Siddeley; further development and maintenance work was undertaken by Hawker Siddeley's own successor companies, British Aerospace and, later, BAE Systems.

Designed in response to a requirement issued by the Royal Air Force (RAF) to replace its fleet of ageing Avro Shackletons, the Nimrod MR1/MR2s were fixed-wing aerial platforms tasked primarily with anti-submarine warfare (ASW) operations; secondary roles included maritime surveillance and anti-surface warfare. It served from the early 1970s until March 2010. The intended replacement was to be extensively rebuilt Nimrod MR2s, designated Nimrod MRA4. Due to considerable delays, repeated cost overruns, and financial cutbacks, the development of the MRA4 was abandoned in 2010.

The RAF also operated three Nimrod R1s, an electronic intelligence gathering (ELINT) variant. A dedicated airborne early warning platform, the Nimrod AEW3, was in development from late 1970s to the mid-1980s; however, much like the MRA4, considerable problems were encountered in development and thus the project was cancelled in 1986 in favour of the Boeing E-3 Sentry, which provided an off-the-shelf solution. All Nimrod variants had been retired by mid-2011.

== Development ==
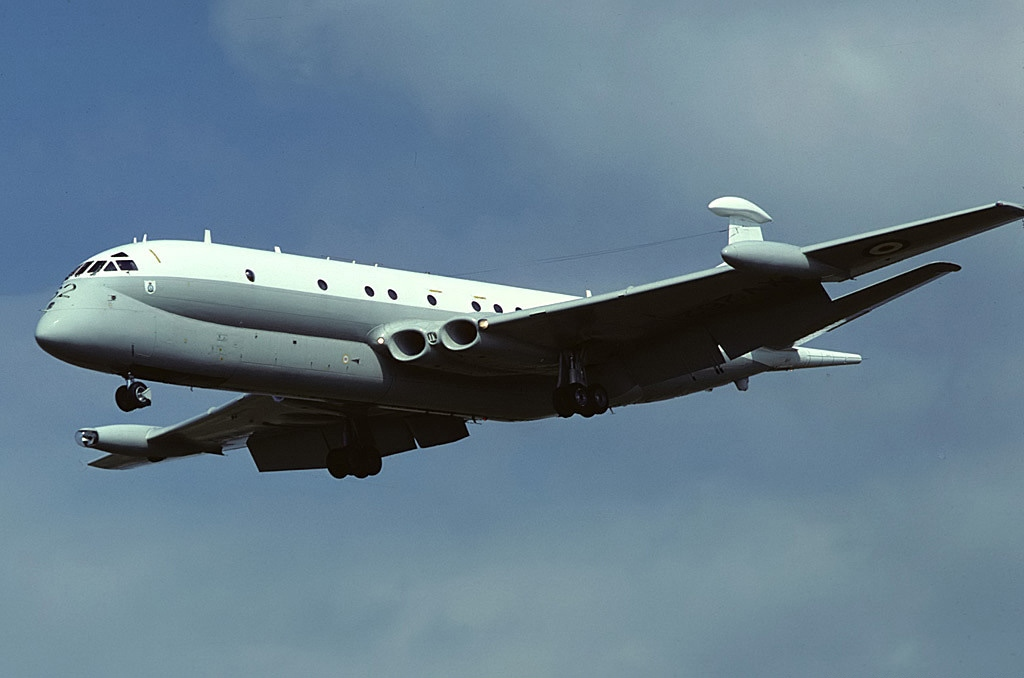
Nimrod MR1 XV262, 1981

=== MR1 ===
External image
- Circa 1967, Nimrod XV242 taxiing at RAF Changi during the type's test and evaluation phase in the Far East

On 4 June 1964, the British Government issued Air Staff Requirement 381, which sought a replacement for the aging Avro Shackleton maritime patrol aircraft of the Royal Air Force (RAF). Such a replacement had been necessitated by the rapidly-approaching fatigue life limitations accumulated across the Shackleton fleet. A great deal of interest in the requirement was received from both British and foreign manufacturers, who offered aircraft including the Lockheed P-3 Orion, the Breguet Atlantic and derivatives of the Hawker Siddeley Trident, BAC One-Eleven, Vickers VC10 and de Havilland Comet. On 2 February 1965, Prime Minister Harold Wilson announced the intention to order Hawker Siddeley's maritime patrol version of the Comet, the HS.801 as a replacement for Shackleton Mk 2. (Note: Following evaluation testing by the RAF, the Vickers VC10 had been identified as highly suitable for the task; however, an initial version of Comet-based Nimrod could be in service within five years, a more capable Nimrod equipped with the envisioned avionics would follow.)

The Nimrod design was based on the Comet 4 civil airliner which had reached the end of its commercial life (the first two prototype Nimrods, XV148 and XV147, were built from two final unfinished Comet 4C airframes). The Comet's Rolls-Royce Avon turbojet engines were replaced by Rolls-Royce Spey turbofans for better fuel efficiency, particularly at the low altitudes required for maritime patrol. Major fuselage changes were made, including an internal weapons bay, an extended nose for radar, a new tail with electronic warfare (ESM) sensors mounted in a bulky fairing, and a MAD (magnetic anomaly detector) boom. After the first flight in May 1967, the RAF ordered 46 Nimrod MR1s. The first example delivered (XV230) entered service in October 1969. A total of five squadrons using the type were established; four were permanently based in the UK and a fifth was initially based in Malta.

=== R1 ===
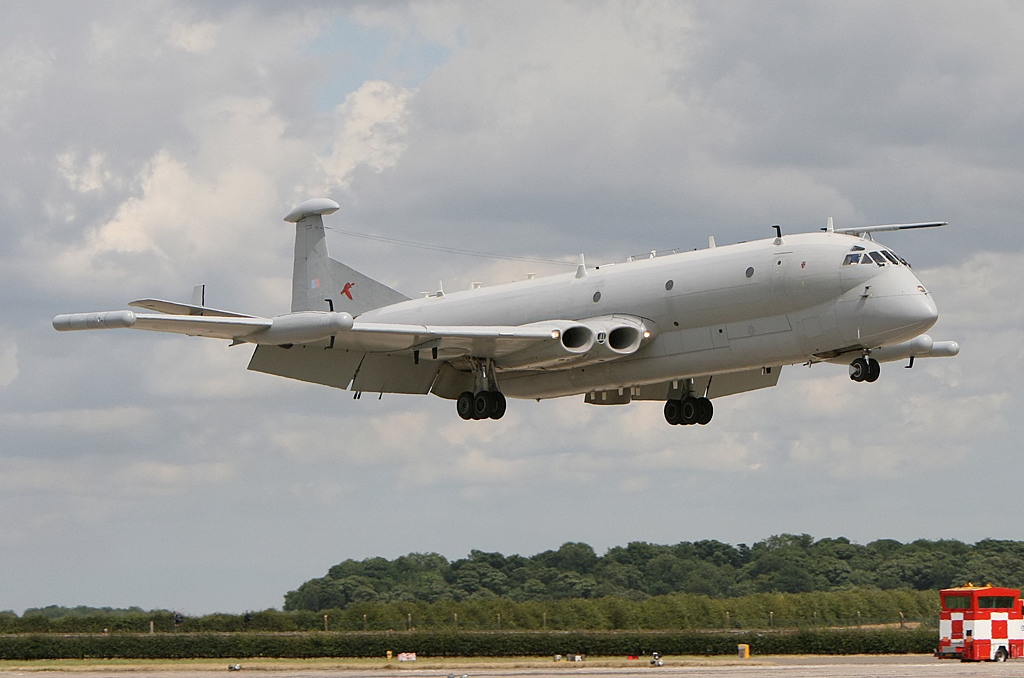
Nimrod R1 XW665 landing during Waddington International Airshow in Lincolnshire in 2009

Three Nimrod aircraft were adapted for the signals intelligence role, replacing the Comet C2s and Canberras of No. 51 Squadron in May 1974. The R1 was visually distinguished from the MR2 by the lack of a MAD boom. It was fitted with an array of rotating dish aerials in the aircraft's bomb bay, with further dish aerials in the tailcone and at the front of the wing-mounted fuel tanks. It had a flight crew of four (two pilots, a flight engineer and one navigator) and up to 25 crew operating the SIGINT equipment.

Only since the end of the Cold War has the role of the aircraft been officially acknowledged; they were once described as "radar calibration aircraft". The R1s have not suffered the same rate of fatigue and corrosion as the MR2s. One R1 was lost in a flying accident since the type's introduction; this occurred in May 1995 during a flight test after major servicing, at RAF Kinloss. To replace this aircraft an MR2 was selected for conversion to R1 standard, and entered service in December 1996.

The Nimrod R1 was based initially at RAF Wyton, Cambridgeshire, and later at RAF Waddington, Lincolnshire, and flown by 51 Sqn. The two remaining Nimrod R1s were originally planned to be retired at the end of March 2011, but operational requirements forced the RAF to deploy one to RAF Akrotiri, Cyprus on 16 March in support of Operation Ellamy. The last flight of the type was on 28 June 2011 from RAF Waddington, in the presence of the Chief of the Air Staff, ACM Sir Stephen Dalton. XV 249, the former MR2, is now on display at the RAF Museum Cosford, West Midlands. The R1 was replaced by three Boeing RC-135W Rivet Joint aircraft, acquired under the Airseeker project; the first aircraft was delivered in late 2013.

=== MR2 ===
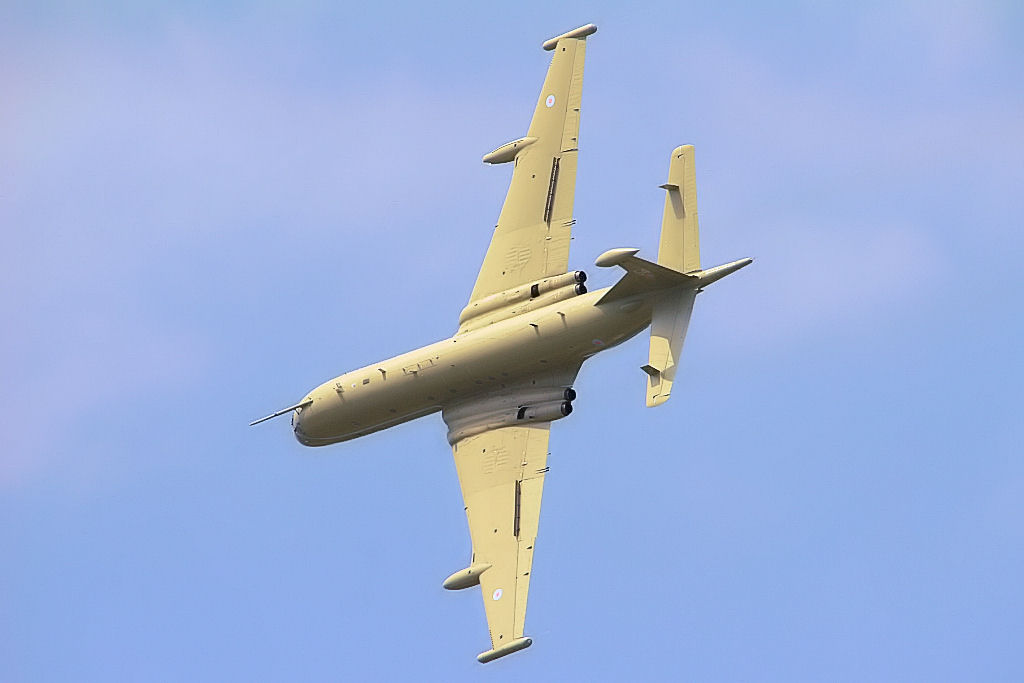
Nimrod MR2 XV254 at a steep bank while displaying at the Royal International Air Tattoo, 2006

Starting in 1975, 35 aircraft were upgraded to MR2 standard, being re-delivered from August 1979. The upgrade included extensive modernisation of the aircraft's electronic suite. Changes included the replacement of the 1950s ASV Mk 21 radar used by the Shackleton and Nimrod MR1 with the new EMI Searchwater radar, (Note: Equipped with the Searchwater radar, a Nimrod could offer an "AWACS-like" capability in the maritime environment.) a new acoustic processor (GEC-Marconi AQS-901) capable of handling more modern sonobuoys, a new mission data recorder (Hanbush) and a new Electronic Support Measures (Yellow Gate) which included new pods on the wingtips.

Provision for in-flight refuelling was introduced during the Falklands War (as the MR2P), as well as hardpoints to allow the Nimrod to carry the AIM-9 Sidewinder missile to counter enemy Argentine Air Force maritime surveillance aircraft. In preparation for operations in the Gulf War theatre, several MR2s were fitted with new communications and ECM equipment to deal with anticipated threats; at the time these modified aircraft were given the designation MR2P(GM) (Gulf Mod).

The Nimrod MR2 carried out three main roles: Anti-Submarine Warfare (ASW), Anti-Surface Unit Warfare (ASUW) and Search and Rescue (SAR). Its extended range enabled the crew to monitor maritime areas far to the north of Iceland and up to 2,200 nautical miles (4,000 km) out into the Western Atlantic. With Air-to-Air Refuelling (AAR), range and endurance was greatly extended. The crew consisted of two pilots and one flight engineer, two navigators (one tactical navigator and a routine navigator), one Air Electronics Officer (AEO), the sonobuoy sensor team of two Weapon System Operators (WSOp ACO) and four Weapon System Operators (WSOp EW) to manage passive and active electronic warfare systems.

Until 2010, the Nimrod MR2 was based at RAF Kinloss in Scotland (120, 201 and 206 Squadrons), and RAF St Mawgan in Cornwall (42 and 38(R) Squadrons). Following Options for Change, 42 Squadron was disbanded and its number reassigned to 38(R) Squadron. The Nimrod MR2 aircraft was withdrawn on 31 March 2010, a year earlier than planned, for financial reasons. The last official flight of a Nimrod MR2 took place on 26 May 2010, with XV229 flying from RAF Kinloss to Kent International Airport to be used as an evacuation training airframe at the nearby MOD Defence Fire Training and Development Centre.

=== AEW3 ===
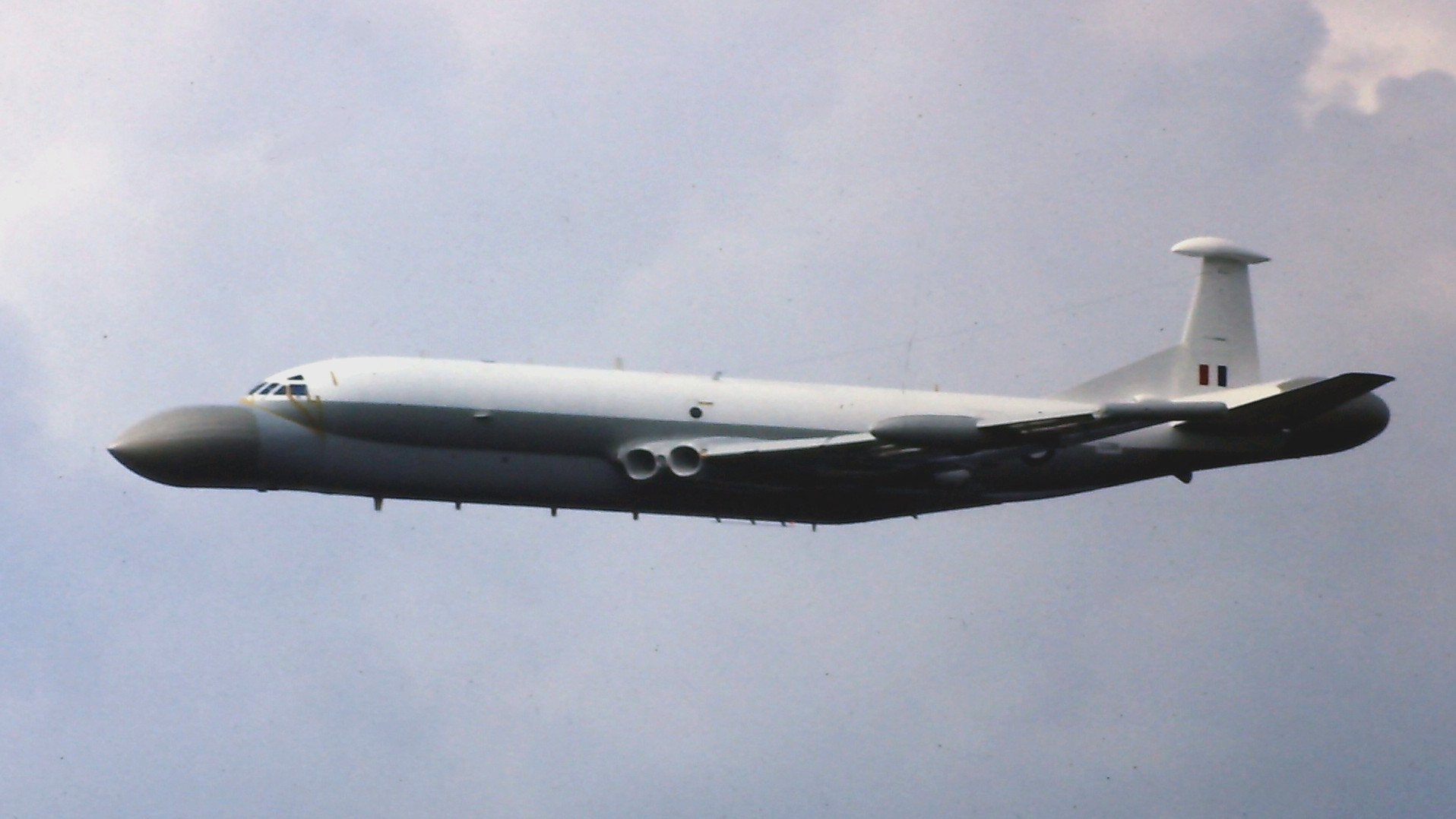
Nimrod AEW3 XZ286 at the 1980 Farnborough Air Show

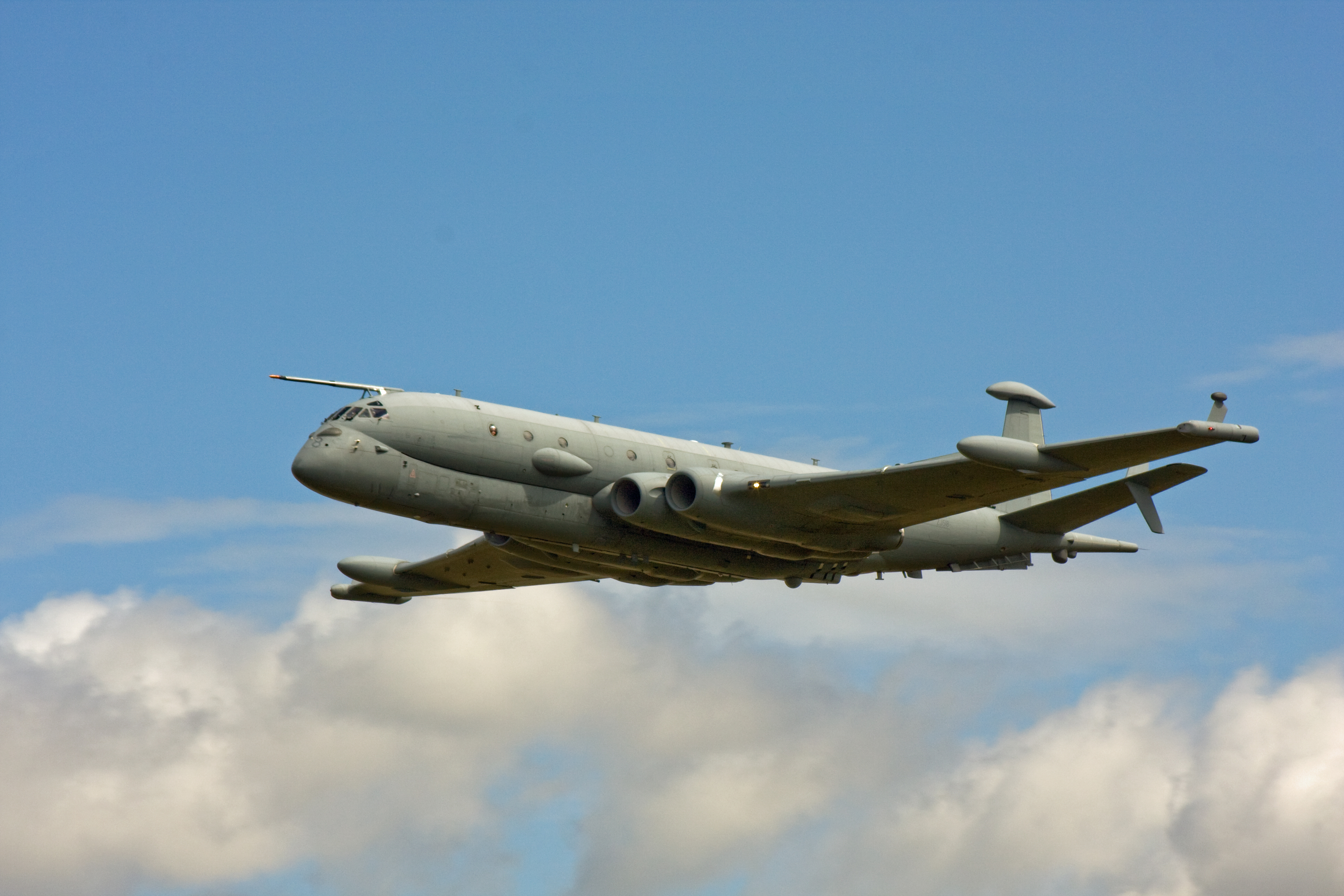
Nimrod MRA4 ZJ518 during a test flight

In the mid-1970s, a modified Nimrod was proposed for the Airborne Early Warning (AEW) mission – again as a replacement for the Lancaster-derived, piston-engined Shackleton AEW.2. Eleven existing Nimrod airframes were to be converted by British Aerospace to house the GEC Marconi radars in a bulbous nose and tail. The Nimrod AEW3 project was plagued by cost over-runs and problems with the GEC 4080M computer used. Eventually, the MoD recognised that the cost of developing the radar system to achieve the required level of performance was prohibitive and the probability of success very uncertain, and in December 1986 the project was cancelled. The RAF eventually received seven Boeing E-3 Sentry aircraft instead.

=== MRA4 ===
The Nimrod MRA4 was intended to replace the capability provided by the MR2. It was essentially a new aircraft, with current-generation Rolls-Royce BR710 turbofan engines, a new larger wing, and fully refurbished fuselage. The project was subject to delays, cost over-runs, and contract re-negotiations. The type had been originally intended to enter service in 2003 but was cancelled in 2010 as a result of the Strategic Defence and Security Review, at which point it was £789 million over-budget; the development airframes were also scrapped. Some functions were allocated to other assets, with Hercules transport aircraft and E-3 Sentry Airborne Early Warning aircraft given some tasks, but the cancellation of the MRA4 resulted in a significant gap in long-range maritime patrol and search-and rescue capability.

In July 2016, the Ministry of Defence announced the purchase of nine Boeing P-8A Poseidon aircraft for the RAF. The RAF declared the P-8 had reached initial operating capability (IOC) on 1 April 2020, by which time two of the planes had been delivered. The nine aircraft will be based at RAF Lossiemouth.

== Design ==
=== Overview ===
The Nimrod was the first jet-powered MPA to enter service, being powered by the Rolls-Royce Spey turbofan engine. Aircraft in this role had been commonly propelled by piston or turboprop powerplants instead to maximise fuel economy and enable maximum patrol time on station. Advantages of the Nimrod's turbofan engines included greater speed and altitude capabilities, and it was more capable of evading detection by submarines, as propeller-driven aircraft are more detectable underwater by standard acoustic sensors. The Nimrods had a flight endurance of ten hours without aerial refuelling. The MR2s were later fitted to receive mid-air refuelling in response to demands of the Falklands War.

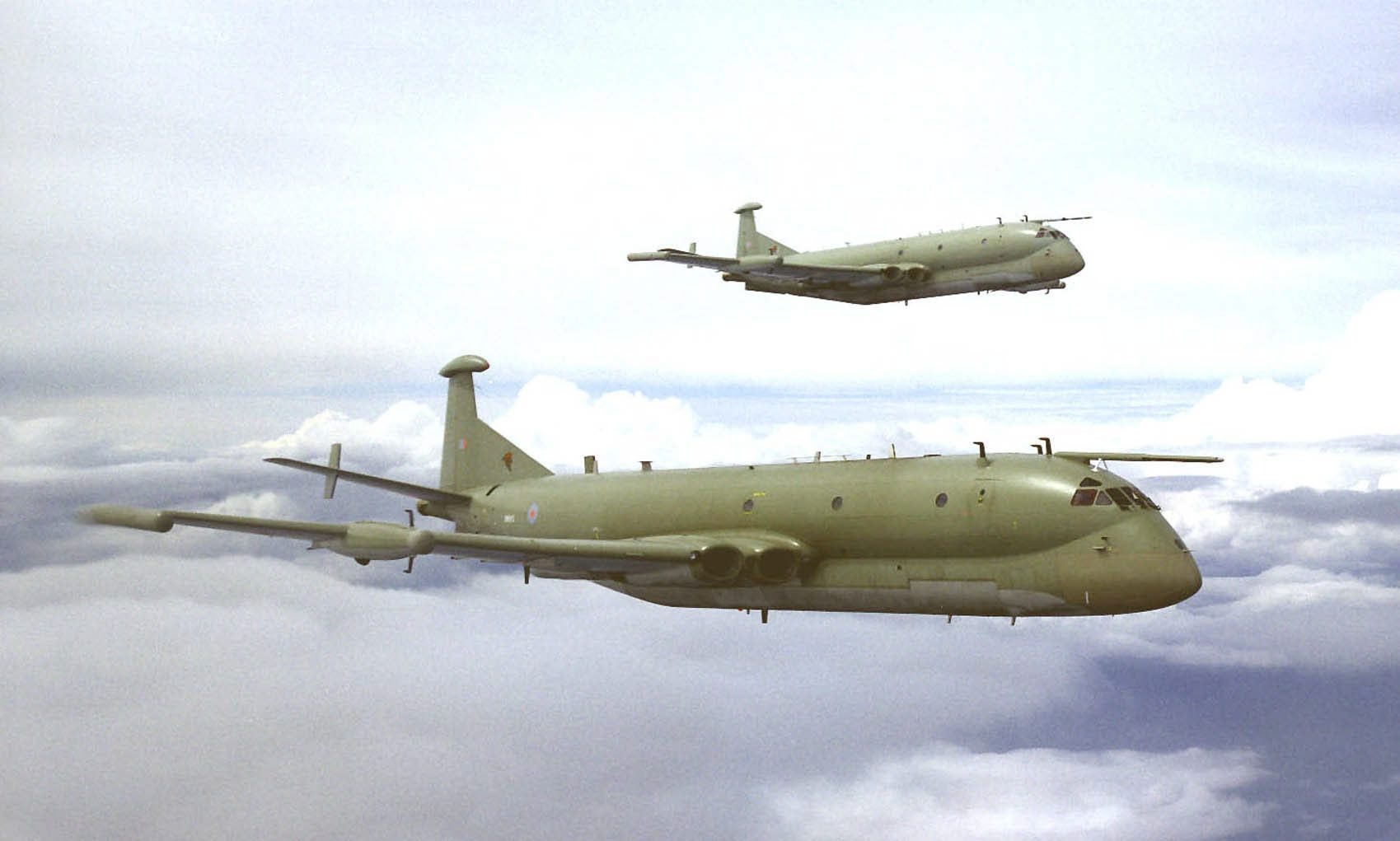
Pair of Nimrod R1s flying in formation, 2004

At the start of a patrol mission all four engines would normally be running; as the aircraft's weight was reduced by fuel consumption, up to two engines could be shut down, allowing the remaining engines to be operated more efficiently. Instead of relying on ram air to restart an inactive engine, compressor air could be crossfed from a live engine to a starter turbine. The crossfeed duct was later discovered to be a potential fire hazard. Similarly, the two hydraulic systems on board were designed to be powered by the two inner engines that would always be running. Electrical generation was designed to far exceed the consumption of existing equipment to accommodate additional systems installed over the Nimrod's service life.

The standard Nimrod fleet carried out three basic operational roles during their RAF service: Anti-Submarine Warfare duties typically involved surveillance over an allocated area of the North Atlantic to detect the presence of Soviet submarines in that area and to track their movements. In the event of war, reconnaissance information gathered during these patrols would be shared with other allied aircraft to enable coordinated strikes at both submarines and surface targets. Search and rescue (SAR) missions were another important duty of the RAF's Nimrod fleet, operating under the Air Rescue Coordination Centre at RAF Kinloss and were a common sight in both military and civil maritime incidents. Throughout the Nimrod's operational life, a minimum of one aircraft was held in a state of readiness to respond to SAR demands at all times.

=== Avionics ===
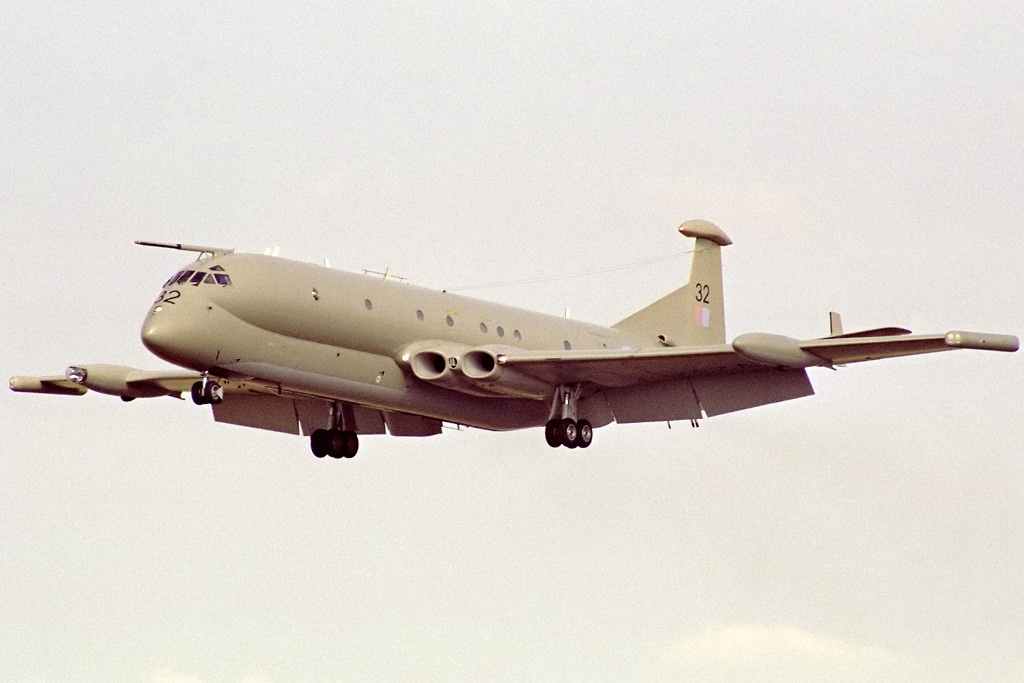
Nimrod MR2 XV232, 1990

The Nimrod featured a crew of up to 25 personnel, although a typical crew numbered roughly 12, most of whom operated the various onboard sensor suites and specialist detection equipment. A significant proportion of the onboard sensor equipment was housed outside the pressure shell inside the Nimrod's distinctive pannier lower fuselage. Sensor systems included radar, ESM radar detection and sonar. The Nimrod and its detection capabilities were an important component of Britain's military defence during the height of the Cold War.

The Nimrod's navigational functions were computerised, and were managed from a central tactical compartment housed in the forward cabin. Various functions such as weapons control and information from sensors such as the large forward doppler radar were displayed and controlled at the tactical station. The flight systems and autopilot could be directly controlled by navigator's stations in the tactical compartment, giving the navigator nearly complete aircraft control. The navigational systems comprised digital, analogue, and electro-mechanical elements. The computers were integrated with most of the Nimrod's guidance systems such as the air data computer, astrocompass, inertial guidance and doppler radar. Navigation information could also be manually input by the operators.

Upon entry into service, the Nimrod was hailed as possessing advanced electronic equipment such as onboard digital computers. The increased capability of these electronic systems allowed the RAF's fleet of 46 Nimrod aircraft to provide equal coverage to that of the larger fleet of retiring Avro Shackletons. The design philosophy of these computerised systems was that of a 'man-machine partnership'; while onboard computers performed much of the data sift and analysis processes, decisions and actions on the basis of that data remained in the operator's hands. To support the Nimrod's anticipated long lifespan, onboard computers were designed to be capable of integrating with various new components, systems, and sensors that could be added in future upgrades. After a mission, gathered information could be extracted for review purposes and for further analysis.

=== Armaments and equipment ===
The Nimrod featured a sizeable bomb bay in which, in addition to armaments such as torpedoes and missiles, could be housed a wide variety of specialist equipment for many purposes, such as up to 150 sonobuoys for ASW purposes or multiple air-deployed dinghies and droppable survival packs such as Lindholme Gear for SAR missions; additional fuel tanks and cargo could also be carried in the bomb bay during ferrying flights. Other armaments equippable in the bomb bay include mines, bombs, and nuclear depth charges; later munitions included the Sting Ray torpedo and Harpoon missile for increased capability.

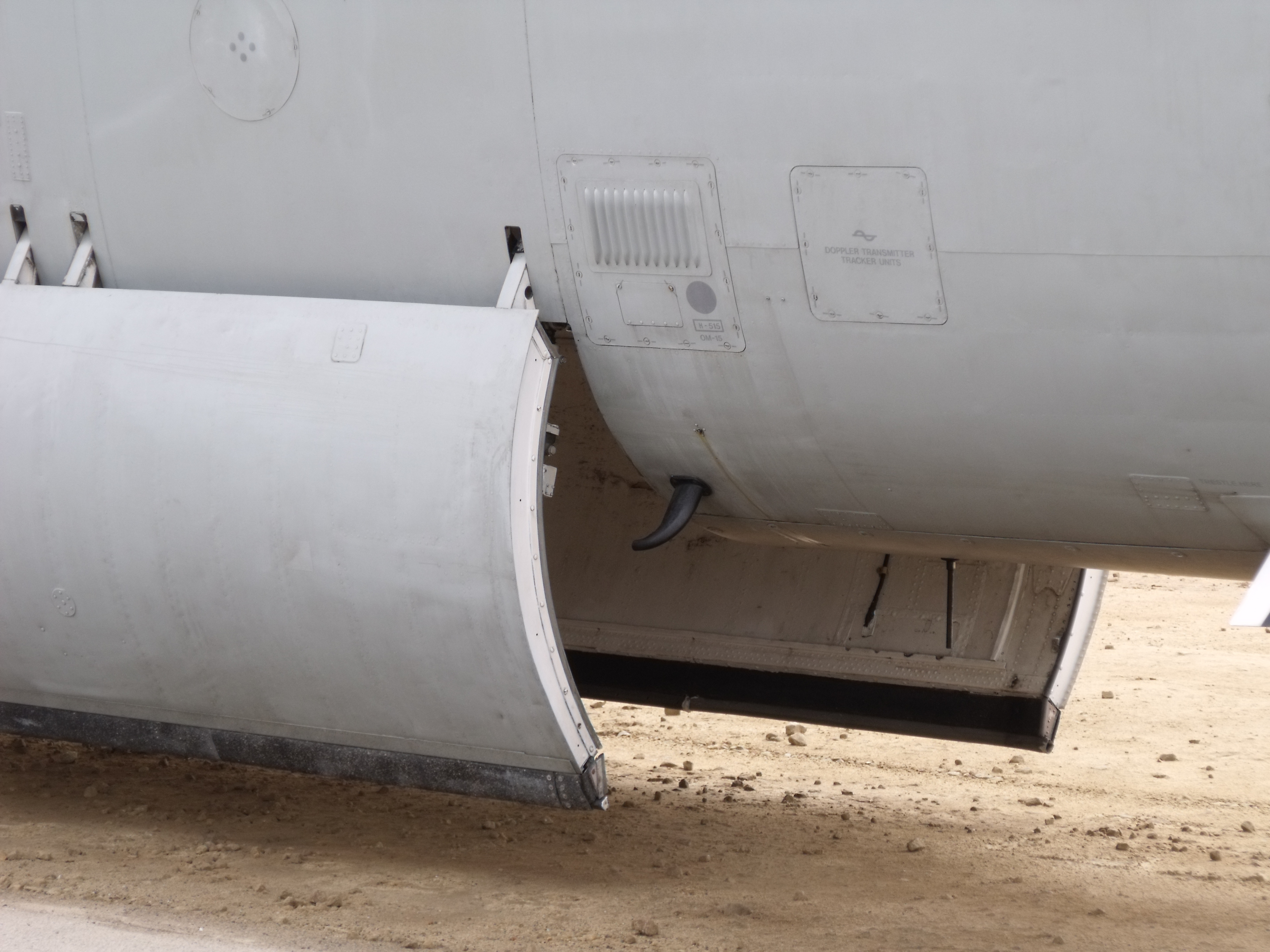
The open bomb bay of a Nimrod

The Nimrod could also be fitted with two detachable pylons mounted underneath the wings to be used with missiles such as the Martel although while planned Martel was never integrated with the Mk1.; two specialised pylons were later added to enable the equipping of AIM-9 Sidewinder missiles, used for self-defence purposes against hostile aircraft. A powerful remote-controlled searchlight was installed underneath the starboard wing for SAR operations. For reconnaissance missions, the aircraft was also equipped with a pair of downward-facing cameras suited to low and high-altitude photography. In later years a newer electro-optical camera system was installed for greater imaging quality.

Various new ECMs and electronic support systems were retrofitted onto the Nimrod fleet in response to new challenges and to increase the type's defensive capabilities; additional equipment also provided more effective means of identification and communication. A number of modifications were introduced during the 1991 Gulf War; a small number of MR2s were fitted with improved Link 11 datalinks, new defensive ECM equipment including the first operational use of a towed radar decoy, and a forward looking infrared turret under the starboard wing.

== Operational history ==
=== Introduction to service ===
The Nimrod first entered squadron service with the RAF at RAF St Mawgan in Cornwall in October 1969. These initial aircraft, designated as Nimrod MR1, were intended as a stop-gap measure, and thus were initially equipped with many of the same sensors and equipment as the Shackletons they were supplementing. While some improvements were implemented on the MR1 fleet to enhance their detection capabilities, the improved Nimrod MR2 variant entered service in August 1979 following a lengthy development process. The majority of the Nimrod fleet operated from RAF Kinloss in Scotland.

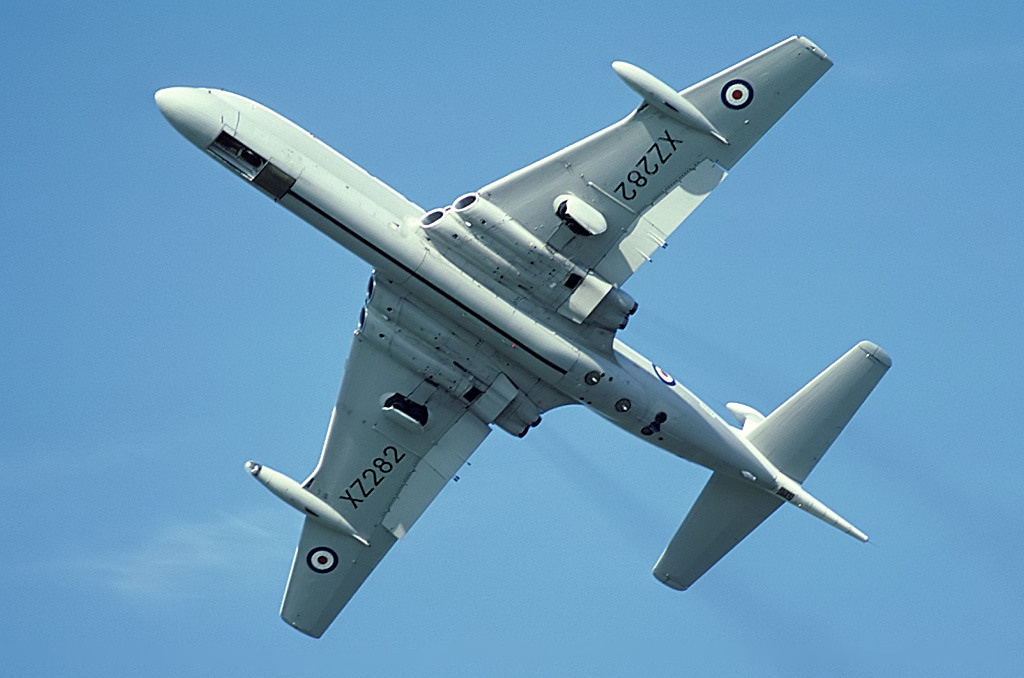
Nimrod MR1 XZ282 inflight (1978)

Operationally, each active Nimrod would form a single piece of a complex submarine detection and monitoring mission. An emphasis on real-time intelligence sharing was paramount to these operations; upon detecting a submarine, Nimrod aircrews would inform Royal Navy frigates and other NATO-aligned vessels in pursuit in an effort to continuously monitor Soviet submarines. The safeguarding of the Royal Navy's Resolution-class ballistic missile submarines, which were the launch platform for Britain's nuclear deterrent, was viewed as being of the utmost priority.

=== Falklands War ===
Nimrods were first deployed to Wideawake airfield on Ascension Island on 5 April 1982, the type at first being used to fly local patrols around Ascension to guard against potential Argentine attacks, and to escort the British Task Force as it sailed south towards the Falklands, with Nimrods also being used to provide search and rescue as well as communications relay support of the Operation Black Buck bombing raids by Avro Vulcans. As the Task Force neared what would become the combat theatre and the threat from Argentine submarines rose, the more capable Nimrod MR2s took on operations initially performed by older Nimrod MR1s. Aviation author Chris Chant has claimed that the Nimrod R1 also conducted electronic intelligence missions operating from Punta Arenas in neutral Chile. The Chilean government allowed an RAF Nimrod R1 to fly signals reconnaissance sorties from the Desventuradas Islands, gathering information on Argentine Air Force movements.

The addition of air-to-air refuelling probes allowed operations to be carried out in the vicinity of the Falklands, while the aircraft's armament was supplemented by the addition of 1,000 pounds (450 kg) general-purpose bombs, BL755 cluster bombs and AIM-9 Sidewinder air-to-air missiles. The use of air-to-air refuelling allowed extremely long reconnaissance missions to be mounted, one example being a 19-hour 5-minute patrol conducted on 15 May 1982 (XV232 Airborne: 0803, Landing: 0308), which passed within 60 miles (97 km) of the Argentine coast to confirm that Argentine surface vessels were not at sea. Another long-range flight was carried out by an MR2 on the night of 20/21 May, covering a total of 8,453 miles (13,604 km), the longest distance flight carried out during the Falklands War. In all, Nimrods flew 111 missions from Ascension in support of British operations during the Falklands War.

=== Gulf War ===
A detachment of three Nimrod MR2s was deployed to Seeb in Oman in August 1990 as a result of the Iraqi invasion of Kuwait, carrying out patrols over the Gulf of Oman and Persian Gulf. Due to the level of threats present in the Gulf theatre, operational Nimrods were quickly retrofitted with a Marconi towed active decoy. Once hostilities commenced, the Nimrod detachment, by now increased to five aircraft, concentrated on night patrols, with daylight patrols carried out by US Navy Lockheed P-3 Orions. Nimrods were used to guide Westland Lynx helicopters and Grumman A-6 Intruder attack aircraft against Iraqi patrol vessels, being credited with assisting in sinking or damaging 16 Iraqi vessels.

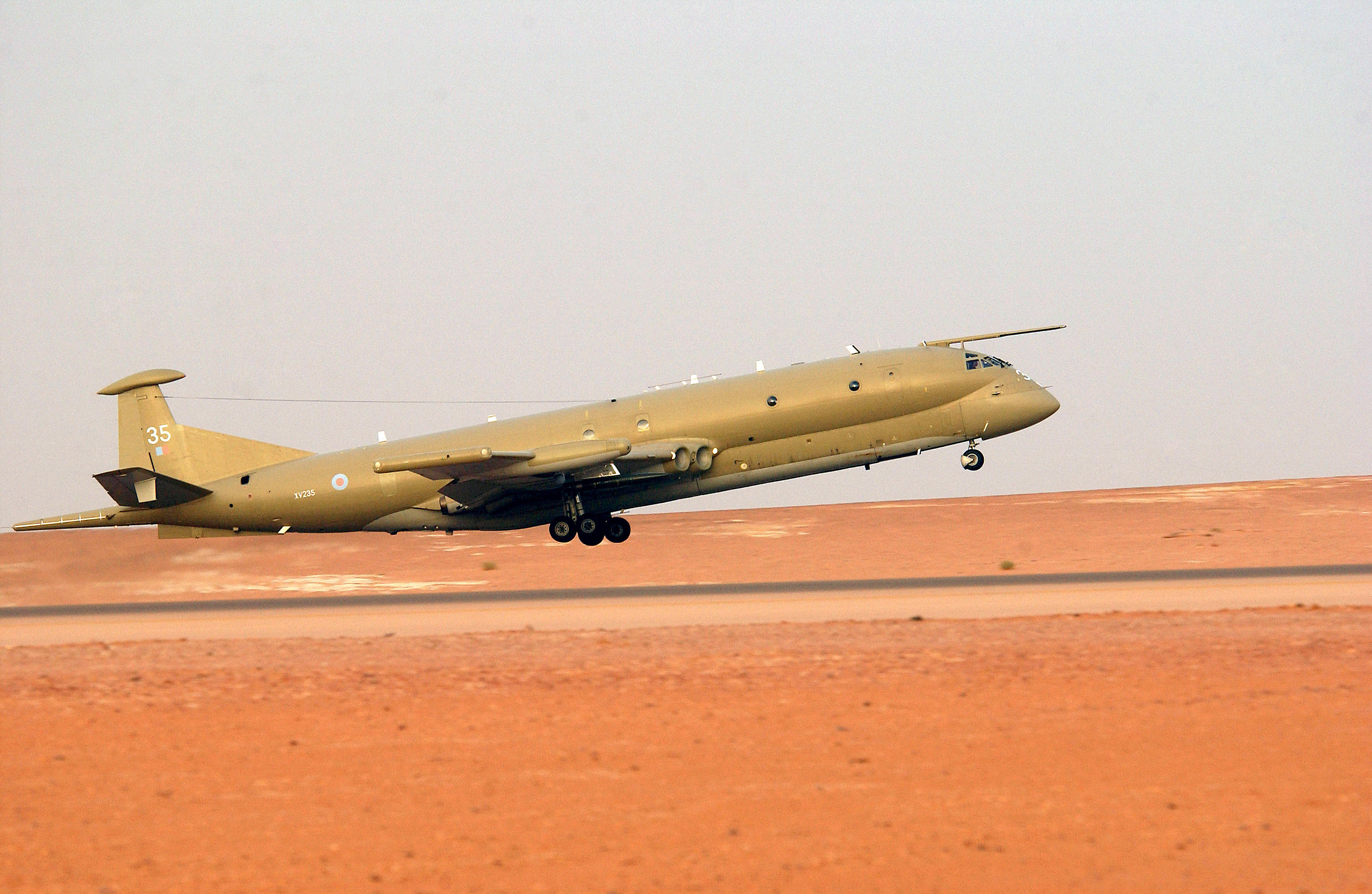
Nimrods, such as MR2 XV235 (shown in 2003), were often deployed to the Middle East

After the ground offensive against Iraqi forces had ended, Britain elected to maintain an RAF presence in the region through assets such as the Nimrod and other aircraft. Nimrod R1s operated from August 1990 to March 1991 from Cyprus, providing almost continuous flying operations from the start of the ground offensive.

=== Afghanistan and Iraq War ===
Nimrods were again deployed to the Middle East as part of the British contribution to the US-led invasion of Afghanistan; missions in this theatre involved the Nimrods performing lengthy overland flights for intelligence-gathering purposes. On 2 September 2006, 14 UK military personnel were killed when a Nimrod MR2 was destroyed in a midair explosion following an onboard fire over Afghanistan. It was the single greatest loss of British military lives since the Falklands War. The outbreak of the Iraq War in March 2003 saw the RAF's Nimrods being used for operations over Iraq, using the aircraft's sensors to detect hostile forces and to direct attacks by friendly coalition forces.

=== Search and rescue ===
While the Nimrod MR1/MR2 was in service, one aircraft from each of the squadrons on rotation was available for search and rescue operations at one-hour standby. The standby aircraft carried two sets of Lindholme Gear in the weapons bay. Usually one other Nimrod airborne on a training mission would also carry a set of Lindholme Gear. As well as using the aircraft sensors to find aircraft or ships in distress, it was used to find survivors in the water, with a capability to search areas of up to 20,000 square miles (52,000 km^{2}). The main role would normally be to act as on-scene rescue coordinator to control ships, fixed-wing aircraft, and helicopters in the search area.

The Nimrod was most often featured in the media in relation to its search-and-rescue role, such as in the reporting of major rescue incidents. In August 1979, several Nimrods were involved in locating yachting competitors during the disaster-stricken 1979 Fastnet race and coordinated with helicopters in searches for survivors from lost vessels. In March 1980, the Alexander L. Kielland, a Norwegian semi-submersible drilling rig, capsized whilst working in the Ekofisk oil field killing 123 people; six different Nimrods searched for survivors and took turns to provide rescue co-ordination, involving the control of 80 surface ships and 20 British and Norwegian helicopters. In an example of its search capabilities, in September 1977 when an attempted crossing of the North Atlantic in a Zodiac inflatable dinghy went wrong, a Nimrod found the collapsed dinghy and directed a ship to it.

=== Operation Tapestry ===
Nimrods at RAF Kinloss, 1999

The Nimrods were often used to enforce Operation Tapestry. Tapestry is a codeword for the activities by ships and aircraft that protect the United Kingdom's Sovereign Sea Areas, including the protection of fishing rights and oil and gas extraction. Following the establishment of a 200 nautical miles (230 mi; 370 km) Exclusive Economic Zone (EEZ) at the beginning of 1977 the Nimrod fleet was given the task of patrolling the 270,000 square miles (700,000 km^{2}) area. The aircraft would locate, identify, and photograph vessels operating in the EEZ. The whole area was routinely patrolled. In addition to surveillance, the aircraft would communicate with all oil and gas platforms. During the Icelandic Cod Wars of 1972 and 1975–1976, the Nimrod fleet closely cooperated with Royal Navy surface vessels to protect British civilian fishing ships.

== Variants ==
Type	Role	Number Built	Notes
HS.801	Prototype	2	Built using redundant Comet 4 airframes
MR.1	Anti-submarine Warfare	46	
R.1	Signals Intelligence	4	One converted from MR.2
MR.2	Anti-submarine warfare	35	Modernised MR.1 aircraft
AEW.3	Airborne early warning	11	Converted from redundant MR.1 aircraft; project cancelled
MRA.4	Anti-submarine warfare	5	Converted from MR.2; 21 planned; project cancelled

== Operators ==
United Kingdom

- Royal Air Force
  - 38 (R) Squadron – 1970–1992, "shadow" squadron identity assigned to 236 OCU, formed from the Maritime Operational Training Unit at RAF St Mawgan, England in 1970 with the MR.1, training role transferred to 42 (Reserve) Squadron in 1992.
  - 42 Squadron – 1971–2010, converted to the MR.1 from the Shackleton MR.3 at RAF St Mawgan, England in 1971, converted to the MR.2 1983–84, withdrawn as an operational squadron in 1992 it became the Operational Conversion Unit for the Nimrod at RAF Kinloss. The squadron MR.2 aircraft were withdrawn in 2010 and the squadron prepared to train crews for the MRA.4, following the decision to scrap the MRA.4 the squadron disbanded in 2011.
  - 51 Squadron – 1971–2011, R.1s added to fleet in 1971 at RAF Wyton, England to supplement the Comet C.2(R) which were withdrawn in 1975. Moved to RAF Waddington in 1995, the R.1s were the last flying Nimrods when they were withdrawn in 2011.
  - 120 Squadron – 1970–2010, converted to MR.1 from the Shackleton MR.3 at RAF Kinloss, Scotland in 1970, converted to the MR.2 1981–82, disbanded in 2010 following the withdrawal of the MR.2 from service.
  - 201 Squadron – 1970–2010, converted to MR.1 from the Shackleton MR.3 at RAF Kinloss, Scotland in 1970, converted to the MR.2 1982–83, disbanded in 2010 following the withdrawal of the MR.2 from service.
  - 203 Squadron – 1971–1977, converted to MR.1 from the Shackleton MR.3 at RAF Luqa, Malta in 1971, disbanded in 1977 following the decision to withdraw British forces from Malta.
  - 206 Squadron – 1971–2005, converted to MR.1 from the Shackleton MR.3 at RAF Kinloss, Scotland in 1970, converted to MR.2 1980–81, disbanded in 2005.
  - Nimrod AEW Joint Trials Unit – 1984–1987, trials unit for the AEW.3 based at RAF Waddington.

== Accidents and incidents ==
Five Nimrods were lost in accidents during the type's service with the RAF:

- On 17 November 1980, Nimrod MR2 XV256 crashed near RAF Kinloss after three engines failed following multiple birdstrikes. Both pilots were killed but the remaining crew survived.
- On 3 June 1984, Nimrod MR2 XV257 stationed at RAF St Mawgan suffered extensive damage when a reconnaissance flare ignited in the bomb bay during flight. The aircraft successfully returned to base but was subsequently written off due to fire damage. There were no casualties.
- On 16 May 1995, Nimrod R1 XW666 ditched in the Moray Firth 4.5 miles (7.2 km) from Lossiemouth after an engine caught fire during a post-servicing test flight from RAF Kinloss. The Ministry of Defence (MoD) inquiry identified a number of technical issues as the cause. There were no casualties.
- On 2 September 1995, Nimrod MR2 XV239 crashed into Lake Ontario while participating in the Canadian International Air Show, killing the seven crew members.
- On 2 September 2006, Nimrod MR2 XV230 crashed near Kandahar in Afghanistan, killing all 14 servicemen on board – the largest loss of UK military personnel in a single event since the Falklands War. This was the first Nimrod to enter service, originally as an MR1 but upgraded to MR2 standard in the 1980s. On 23 February 2007, the Ministry of Defence grounded all Nimrod MR2s while fuel pumps were inspected, but stressed that the inspection was not necessarily related to this crash.
- On 5 November 2007, XV235 was involved in a midair incident over Afghanistan when the crew noticed a fuel leak during air-to-air refuelling. After transmitting a mayday call, the crew landed the aircraft successfully. The incident came only a month before the issue of the report of a Board of Enquiry into 2 September 2006 fatal accident to XV230 in (likely) similar circumstances. The RAF subsequently suspended air-to-air refuelling operations for this type.

== Aircraft on display ==
External videos
- Nimrod arriving at Manchester Airport aviation viewing park
- Nimrod conducts flyover prior to landing at Coventry Airport
- Nimrod MR2 take-off from RAF Kinloss

MR2

- XV226 – Bruntingthorpe Aerodrome
- XV231 – Manchester Airport aviation viewing park
- XV232 – Coventry airport
- XV244 – Morayvia
- XV250 – Yorkshire Air Museum
- XV255 – City of Norwich Aviation Museum

R1

- XV249 – Royal Air Force Museum Midlands
- XW664 – East Midlands Aeropark

== Specifications (MR.2) ==
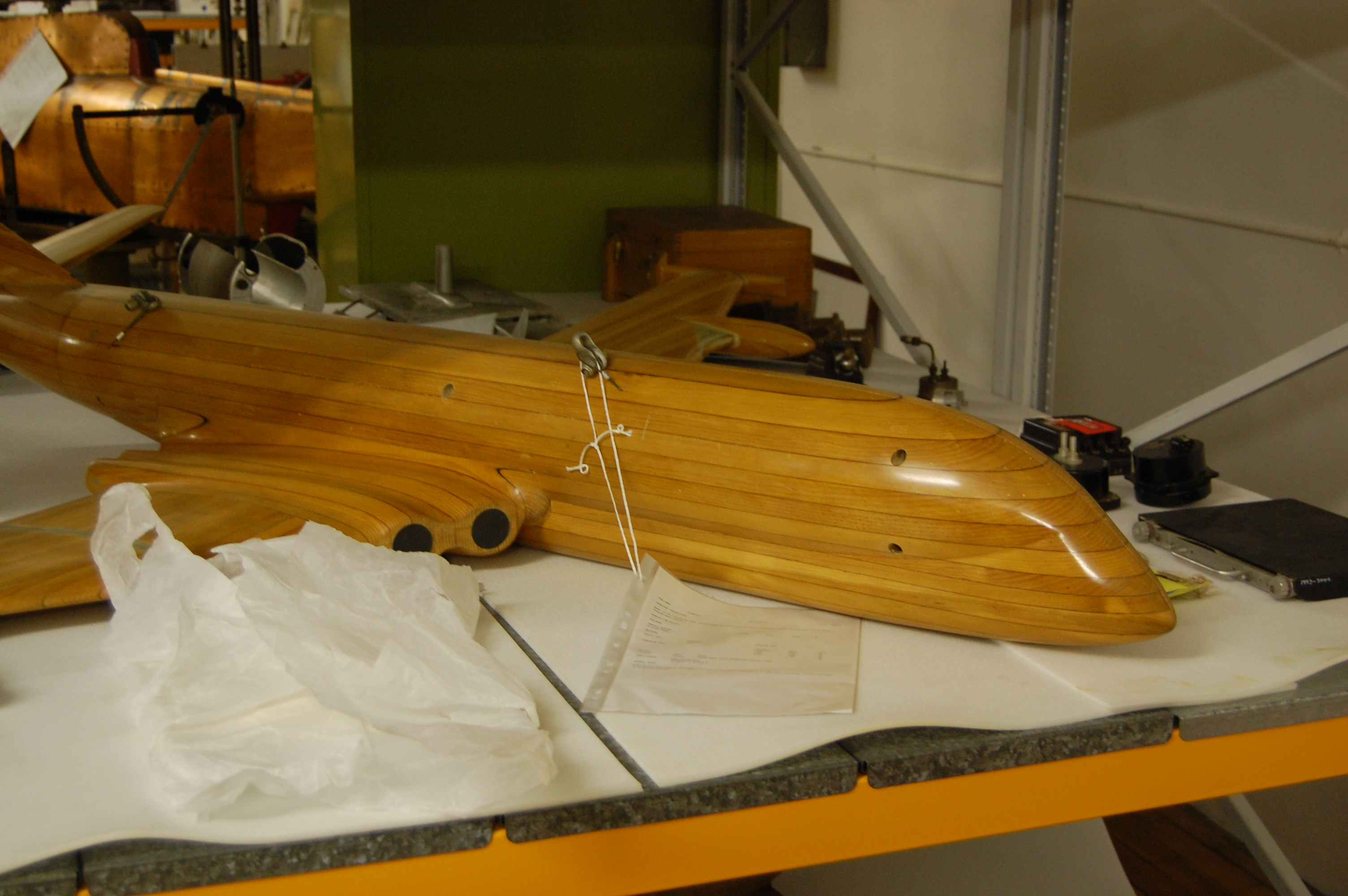
Wooden Nimrod model used for aerodynamic wind tunnel testing

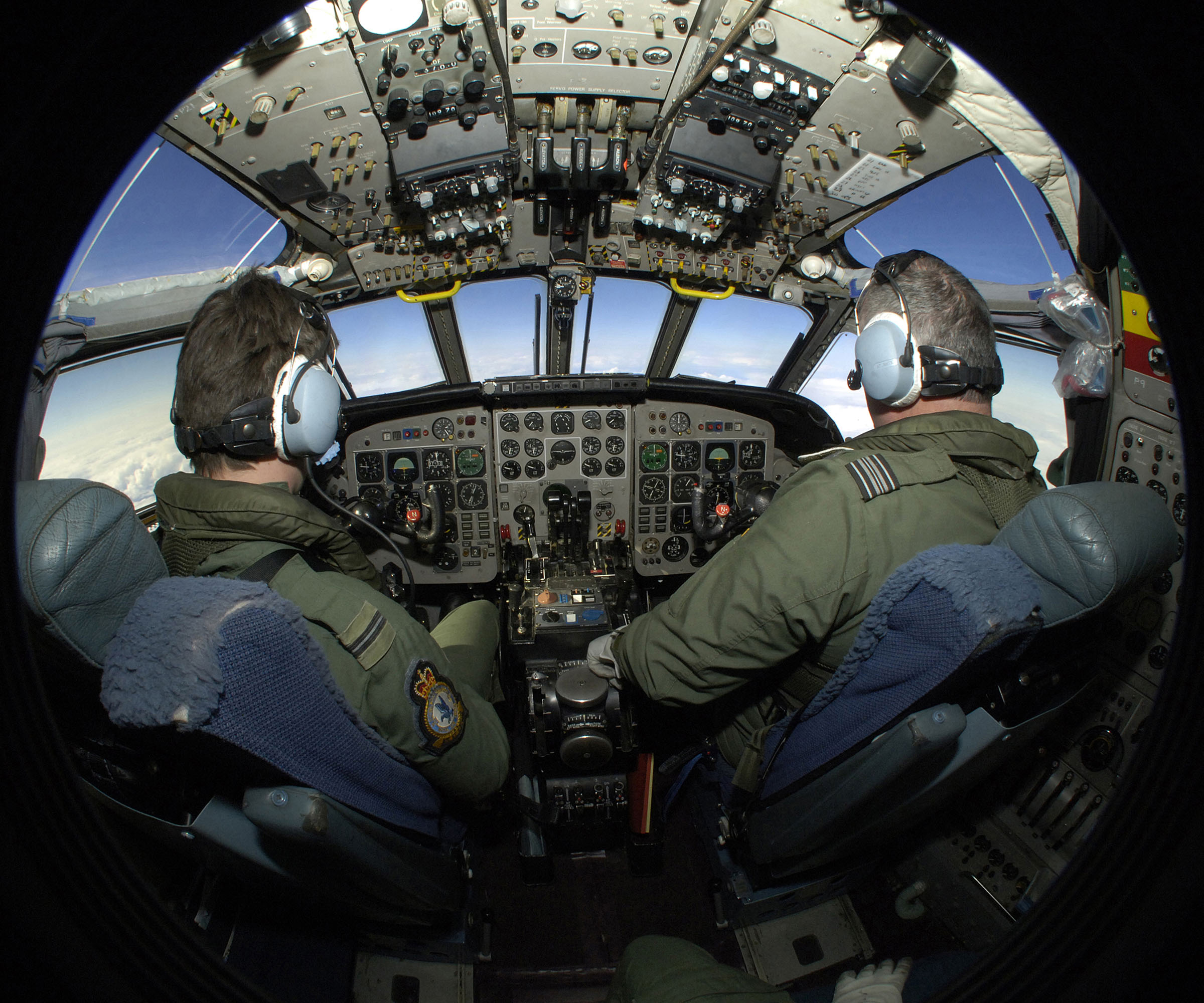
Flight deck of a Nimrod, 2006

External image
- Cutaway of Nimrod MR1 XV230 retouched by Flight Global in 2006

Data from Wilson

General characteristics

- Crew: 13
- Capacity: 13,500 lb (6,123 kg)
- Length: 126 ft 9 in (38.63 m)
- Wingspan: 114 ft 10 in (35.00 m)
- Height: 31 ft (9.4 m)
- Wing area: 2,121.03 sq ft (197.050 m^{2})
- Empty weight: 86,000 lb (39,009 kg)
- Max takeoff weight: 192,000 lb (87,090 kg)
- Fuel capacity: 85,840 lb (38,936 kg)
- Powerplant: 4 × Rolls-Royce Spey turbofan engines, 12,160 lbf (54.1 kN) thrust each

Performance

- Maximum speed: 500 kn (580 mph, 930 km/h)
- Cruise speed: 426 kn (490 mph, 789 km/h)
- Range: 4,501–5,001 nmi (5,180–5,755 mi, 8,336–9,262 km) Ferry range with all four engines operating. During low-altitude anti-submarine loiter missions with the outer pair engines shut down for maximum fuel efficiency, the theoretical maximum range is extended up to 5,659 nmi (6,512 mi; 10,480 km).
- Service ceiling: 43,999 ft (13,411 m)

Armament

- Hardpoints: 2× under-wing pylon stations and an internal bomb bay with a capacity of 20,000 lb (9,100 kg), with provisions to carry combinations of:
  - Missiles:
    - Air-to-air missile:
      - 2× AIM-9 Sidewinder (non-standard in RAF service, only mounted on the MR2 during the Falklands War)
    - Air-to-surface missile:
      - Nord AS.12
      - Martel missile
      - AGM-65 Maverick
      - AGM-84 Harpoon
  - Bombs:
    - Depth charges:
      - 2x US-owned B57 nuclear depth bombs (until 1992)
  - Other:
    - Air-dropped Mk.46 torpedoes
    - Sting Ray torpedoes
    - Naval mines
    - Sonobuoys

== See also ==
Related development

- de Havilland Comet
- Hawker Siddeley Nimrod R1
- British Aerospace Nimrod AEW3
- BAE Systems Nimrod MRA4

Aircraft of comparable role, configuration, and era

- Breguet Atlantic
- Ilyushin Il-38
- Lockheed P-3 Orion
- Lockheed CP-140 Aurora
- Tupolev Tu-142
