= Lindholme Gear =

British air-dropped sea rescue equipment

Lindholme Gear (also known as Air Sea Rescue Apparatus Mk 4) was a British air-dropped rescue equipment designed during the Second World War to aid survivors in the water and was still in use in the 21st century.

== Design and development ==
The Lindholme Gear was developed at RAF Lindholme by Group Captain Waring during the 1940s to provide a simpler rescue system than the air-dropped lifeboats then in use. The Lindholme Gear is five cylinder-shaped containers joined together by lengths of floating rope. The centre container would house a nine-man inflatable dinghy with the other containers housing survival equipment such as emergency rations and clothing. The containers were discarded containers from the tail-units of 500lb and 250lb bombs.

== Operation ==
The Gear would be carried in the weapons bay of the aircraft and dropped in a long line up-wind of the survivors. The Dinghy would inflate on impact and then drift towards the survivors. The survivors could then use the dinghy, haul in the containers of equipment, and await rescue.

The Lindholme Gear was originally designed to be carried by Handley Page Hampden aircraft but was mainly carried by Royal Air Force maritime patrol aircraft like the Vickers Warwick and later the Avro Lancaster, Avro Shackleton and Hawker Siddeley Nimrod. The Gear was also used by the Royal Canadian Air Force and the South African Air Force Avro Shackleton. Lindholme gear was also carried in the bomb bay by the Royal Australian Air Force maritime patrol aircraft Lockheed P-3B & P-3C Orions, consisting of two 10-man liferafts and two stores containers; this equipment was later replaced by ASRK (Air Sea Rescue Kits).

== See also ==
- Index of aviation articles
- CLE Canister air dropped container for various supplies
