= Hawker Siddeley Nimrod R1 =

British reconnaissance aircraft

Nimrod R1
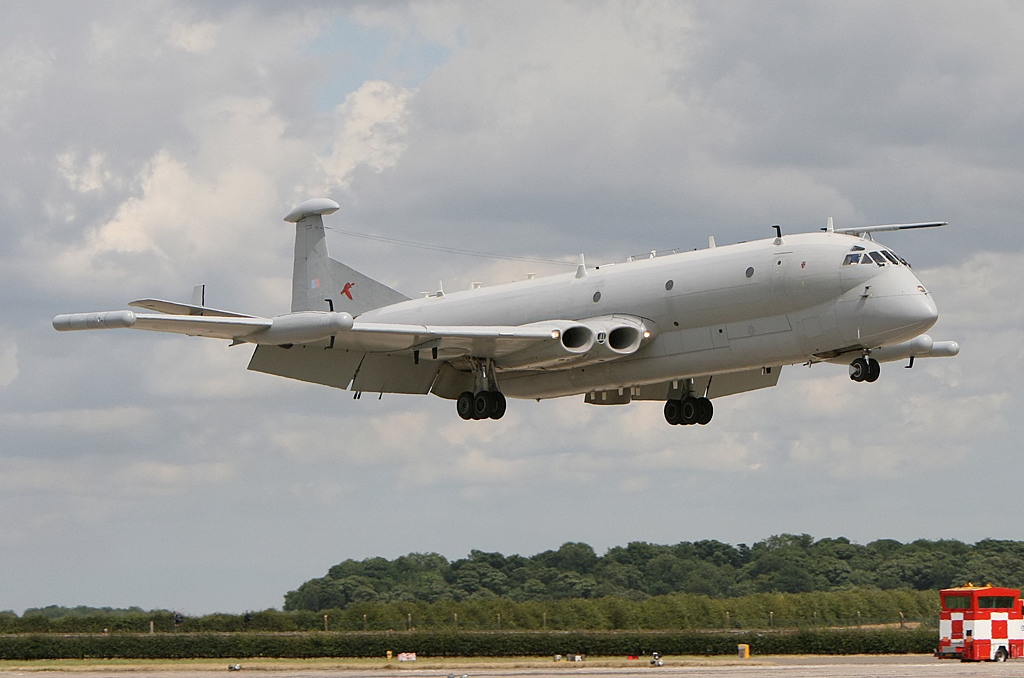
- Nimrod R1 landing

General information
- Role: Signals intelligence
- National origin: United Kingdom
- Manufacturer: Hawker Siddeley
- Status: Retired
- Primary user: Royal Air Force
- Number built: 4

History
- Introduction date: May 1974
- First flight: 21 October 1973
- Retired: June 2011
- Developed from: Hawker Siddeley Nimrod

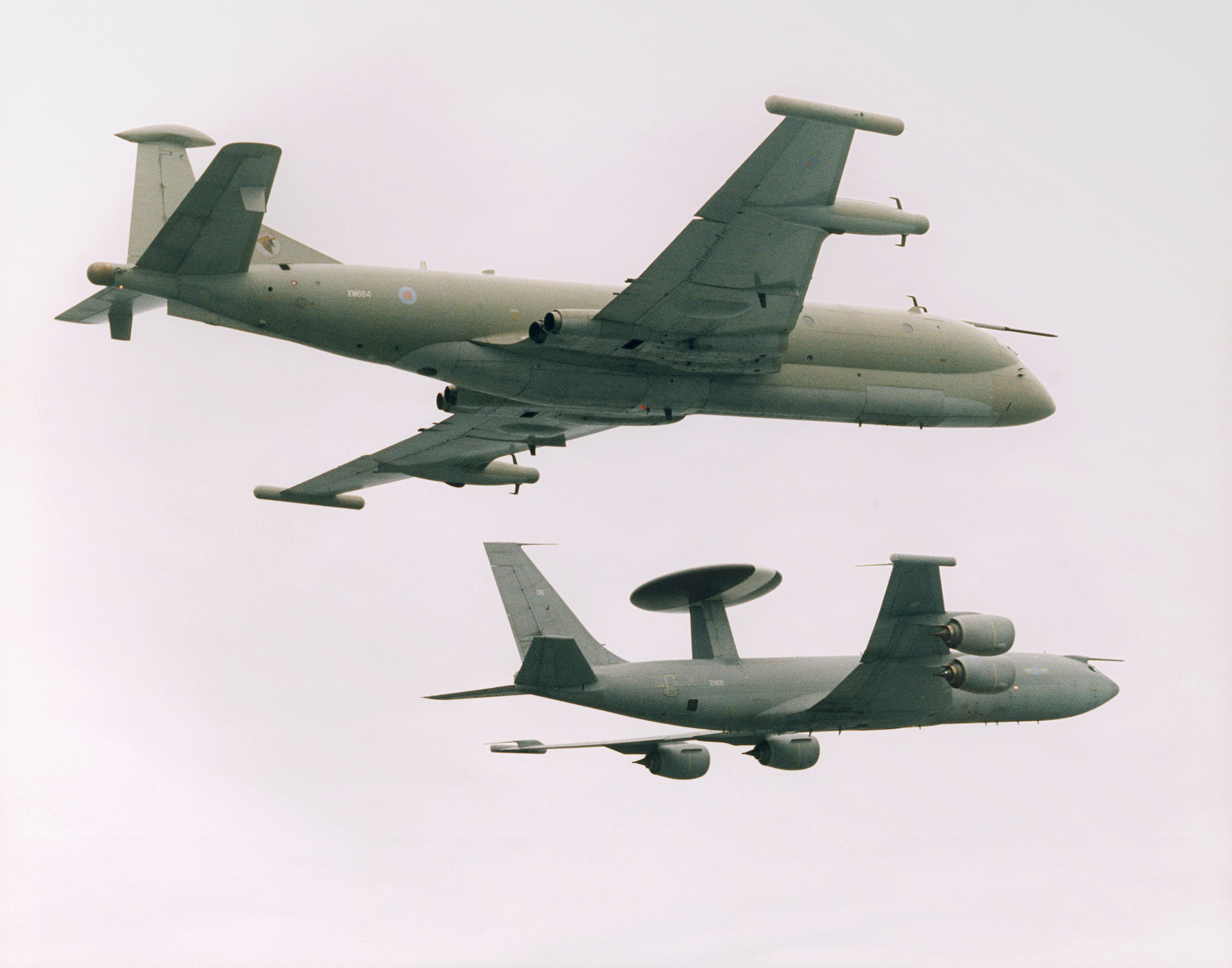
Nimrod R1 alongside a Sentry AEW1 - in 1995, the Nimrods were transferred to RAF Waddington alongside the RAF's Sentry fleet

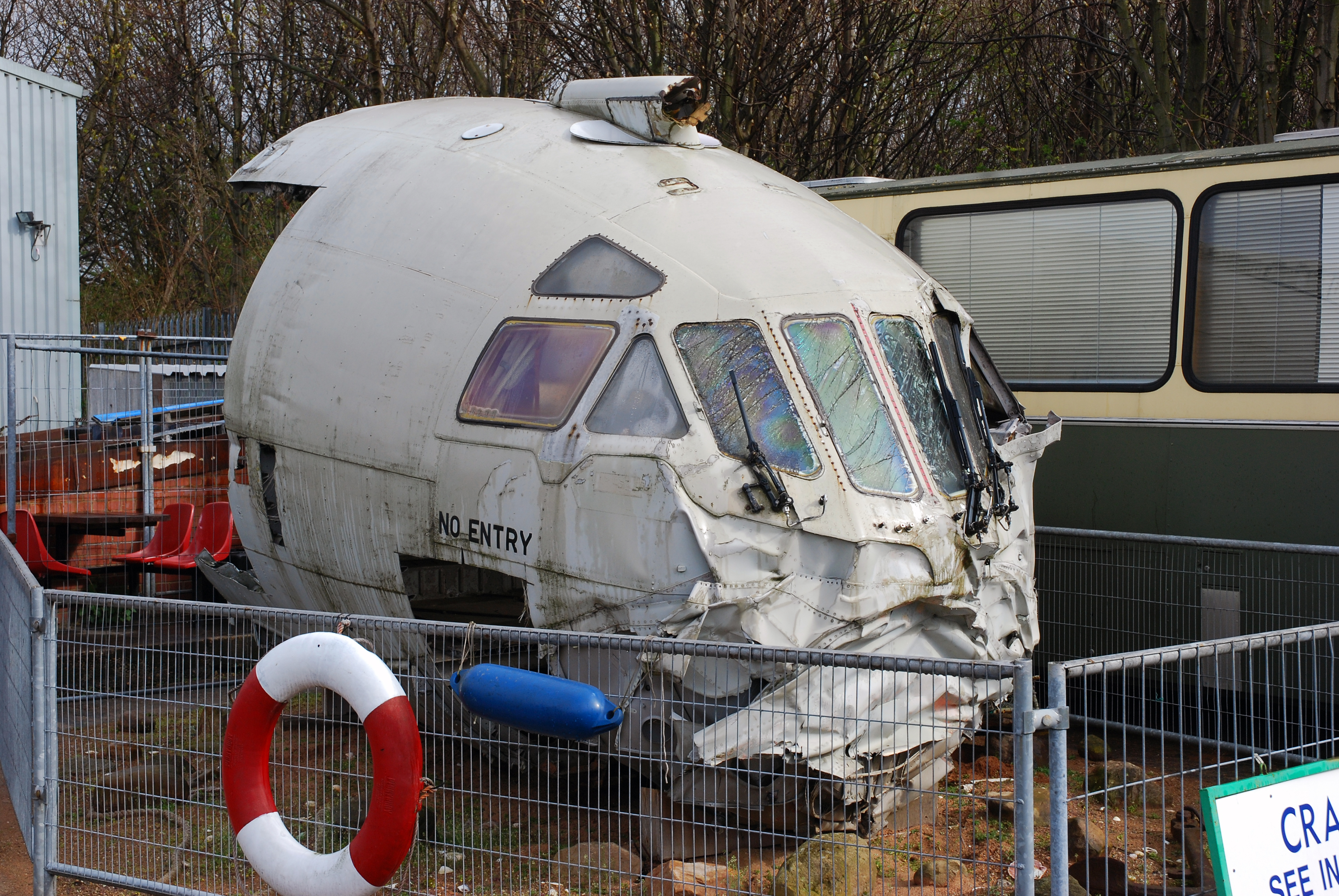
The salvaged cockpit of XW666

The Hawker Siddeley Nimrod R1 is a signals intelligence (reconnaissance) aircraft formerly operated by the Royal Air Force. The aircraft was a conversion of the existing Nimrod maritime patrol aircraft, with all of the previous avionics and armament (optimised for anti-submarine warfare, anti-ship warfare, and search and rescue) replaced by equipment for gathering communications and electronic intelligence.

== History ==
=== Background ===
In 1958, 192 Squadron took delivery of a pair of Comet R2 aircraft, converted for use in the signals intelligence (SIGINT) gathering role, to replace the Avro Lincoln and Boeing Washington aircraft being used in the role. At the same time, the squadron was renumbered as 51 Squadron.

Almost as soon as the aircraft entered service, attention was placed on working on the specifications for a replacement aircraft, as it was envisaged that the Comet would reach the end of its useful life by the early 1970s. The decision to proceed with a new SIGINT aircraft was taken in 1964 by the London Signals Intelligence Committee, which determined that the usefulness of retaining an airborne intelligence gathering capability justified the significant cost of replacing the Comet. In comparing the cost of potential aircraft to undertake this role, including a variant of the Boeing 707 (which the USAF had at the time ordered as the RC-135), the cheapest option was decided to be a variant of the Nimrod maritime patrol aircraft then in development for the Royal Air Force.

Although the Nimrod option was identified as the cheapest, the cost of procuring and modifying three aircraft was still estimated at £14m, a significant proportion of the budget for SIGINT operations. As a consequence of this, in 1967, Sir Burke Trend, the Cabinet Secretary, recommended that the aircraft be declared part of the United Kingdom's nuclear weapons programme, using the rationale that the intelligence gathered by the aircraft would be used to providing data for targeting. This allowed the cost to become part of the overall budget for RAF Strike Command, tying SIGINT in with the RAF's operations of nuclear weapons.

In 1969, a total of three Nimrods were ordered for conversion to SIGINT aircraft, which were designated as R1 to differentiate them from the MR1 maritime reconnaissance version. Three airframes were constructed as part of the overall Nimrod production line before being delivered to the RAF with no equipment fitted. This was owing to the highly secret nature of the equipment intended for use on the aircraft - instead, they were fitted out at RAF Wyton, the home base of 51 Squadron. The first aircraft was delivered in July 1971, and was eventually completed more than two years later, making its first training flight in 21 October 1973, before being formally accepted into service in May 1974. The acceptance of the two remaining aircraft in late 1974 allowed for the withdrawal of the Comets and supporting Canberras.

=== Operations ===
The secrecy of the Nimrod's intended missions led to them being described as "radar calibration" aircraft from their entry into service. The major rationale for the Nimrod in a war situation, as provided by GCHQ, the UK's main SIGINT organisation, and the major consumer of the intelligence gathered by the Nimrod, was to assume the duties of the ground-based SIGINT units based in Berlin, which, it was expected, would be overrun. The intention was for the Nimrod to fly approximately 50 miles from the forward edge of battle area, collecting intelligence and, with the use of on-board operators with ground experience and knowledge of the enemy order of battle, transmit the information directly to ground commanders. The main peacetime use of the Nimrod was largely similar; the ability of the Nimrod to make a high speed transit to its operational area, and then loiter for an extended period, meant that missions would usually involve sitting off the edge of the Soviet sphere of influence receiving and recording signals, which would subsequently be analysed by GCHQ.

Following the end of the Cold War, the RAF became more open about the role of 51 Squadron and the Nimrod R1, particularly when the unit moved from RAF Wyton to RAF Waddington, co-locating the bulk of its ISTAR assets. The aircraft undertook its mission in various post-Cold War operations, including the Former Yugoslavia, Iraq and Afghanistan.

=== Ditching ===
On 16 May 1995, on a test following a major service at RAF Kinloss, one of the three Nimrod R1s suffered a double engine fire and was forced to ditch in the Moray Firth. Following this, a decision was taken to replace the aircraft. In 1992, four Nimrod MR2 aircraft had been stored as part of the Options for Change defence review. One of these was selected for conversion to an R1, under a project code-named Project Anneka, after the BBC series Challenge Anneka. Conversion work of the MR2 began just over a month after the crash, with work completed and the aircraft accepted by the RAF in April 1997.

=== Replacement ===
The Nimrod R1 fleet, owing to its significantly reduced level of usage compared to the MR2, was originally intended to remain in service for an extended period into the 2010s, with a major systems upgrade codenamed Project HELIX. This would have seen the aircraft's own systems, ground stations and training facilities improved, with work starting in 2007. However, in October 2008, the UK Government made a request into the possibility of procuring new aircraft for the SIGINT mission, specifically the RC-135 Rivet Joint, under a new project codenamed Airseeker. In 2009, with the plan for the Rivet Joint making progress, one of 51 Squadron's three Nimrods was withdrawn from service to be used as a spares source for the remaining two. The purchase of three RC-135 aircraft was confirmed in March 2010, with the Nimrod intended to be withdrawn immediately. This was postponed due to the requirement for SIGINT during Operation Ellamy. The Nimrod was finally withdrawn from service in June 2011.

== Design ==
The Nimrod R1 was primarily based around the standard Nimrod MR1 airframe, with the only significant visual differences being the absence of the MAD boom projection from the aircraft's tail, and the presence of radomes on the front of the external wing fuel tanks and on the tailcone. The bulk of the aircraft's detection equipment was installed in the weapons bay, with a total crew of 25, plus five flight crew.

The exact nature of the aircraft's intelligence gathering equipment was highly classified, with very little detail released. The first time that the interior of the aircraft was permitted to be photographed was upon its withdrawal from service in 2011. At this point, it was revealed that the aircraft had a total of 13 side-facing consoles along the length of the main cabin, with three forward facing consoles.

In the 1990s, the Nimrod R1 fleet began to be fitted with a major systems package upgrade called Starwindow. Details of this were not confirmed, but believed to feature new search receivers; a wideband, digital direction-finder; a cluster of digital intercept receivers; and in-flight analysis equipment, including a recording and playback suite, multi-channel digital data demodulator, and pulsed signal processing.

== Operators ==
United Kingdom

- Royal Air Force
  - 51 Squadron

== Aircraft on display ==
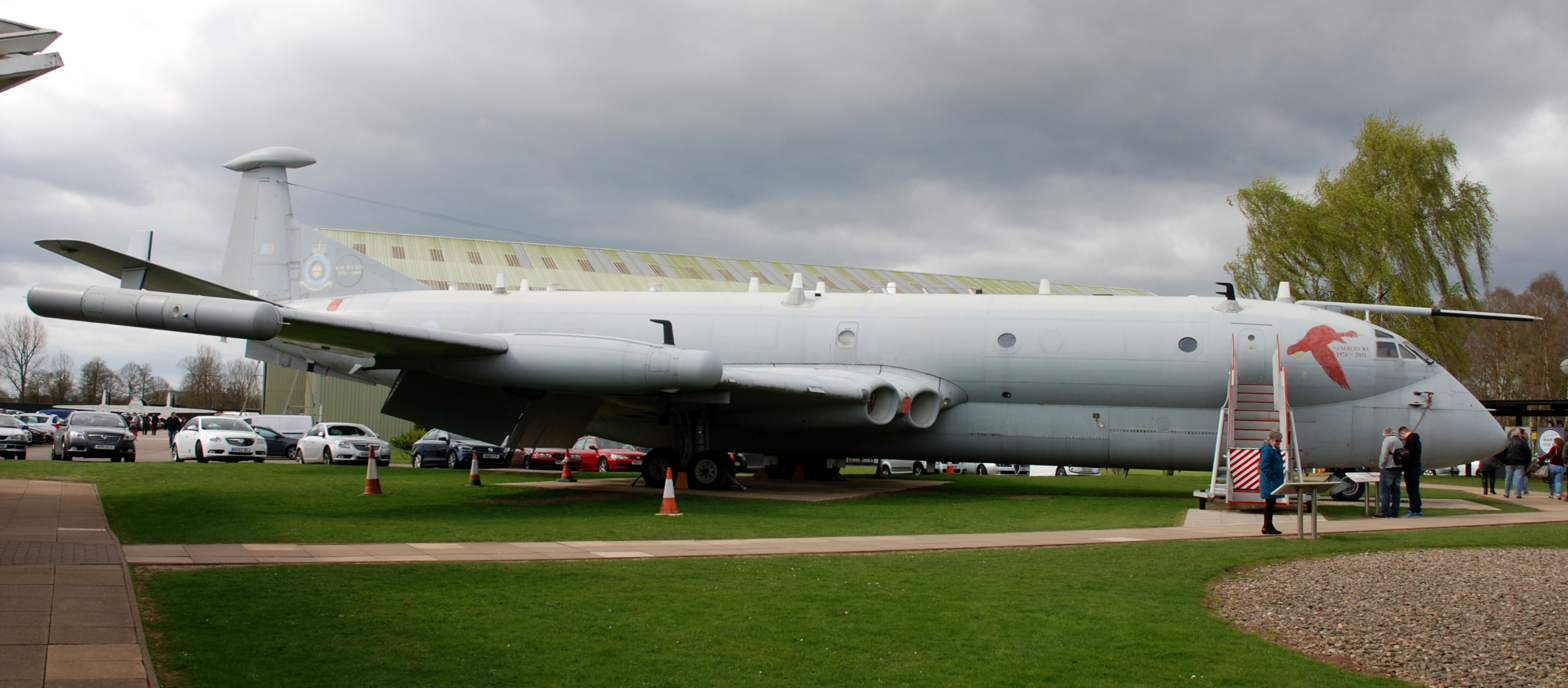
XV249 at RAF Museum Cosford in 2015

Of the four Nimrod R1s constructed in total, two have survived and are on public display:

- XV249 – Royal Air Force Museum Midlands
- XW664 – East Midlands Aeropark

Of the remaining two, the nose of XW665 was transported for display to the Auto & Technik Museum in Sinsheim, while the salvaged nose of XW666 is at the South Yorkshire Aircraft Museum in Doncaster.

== Specifications ==
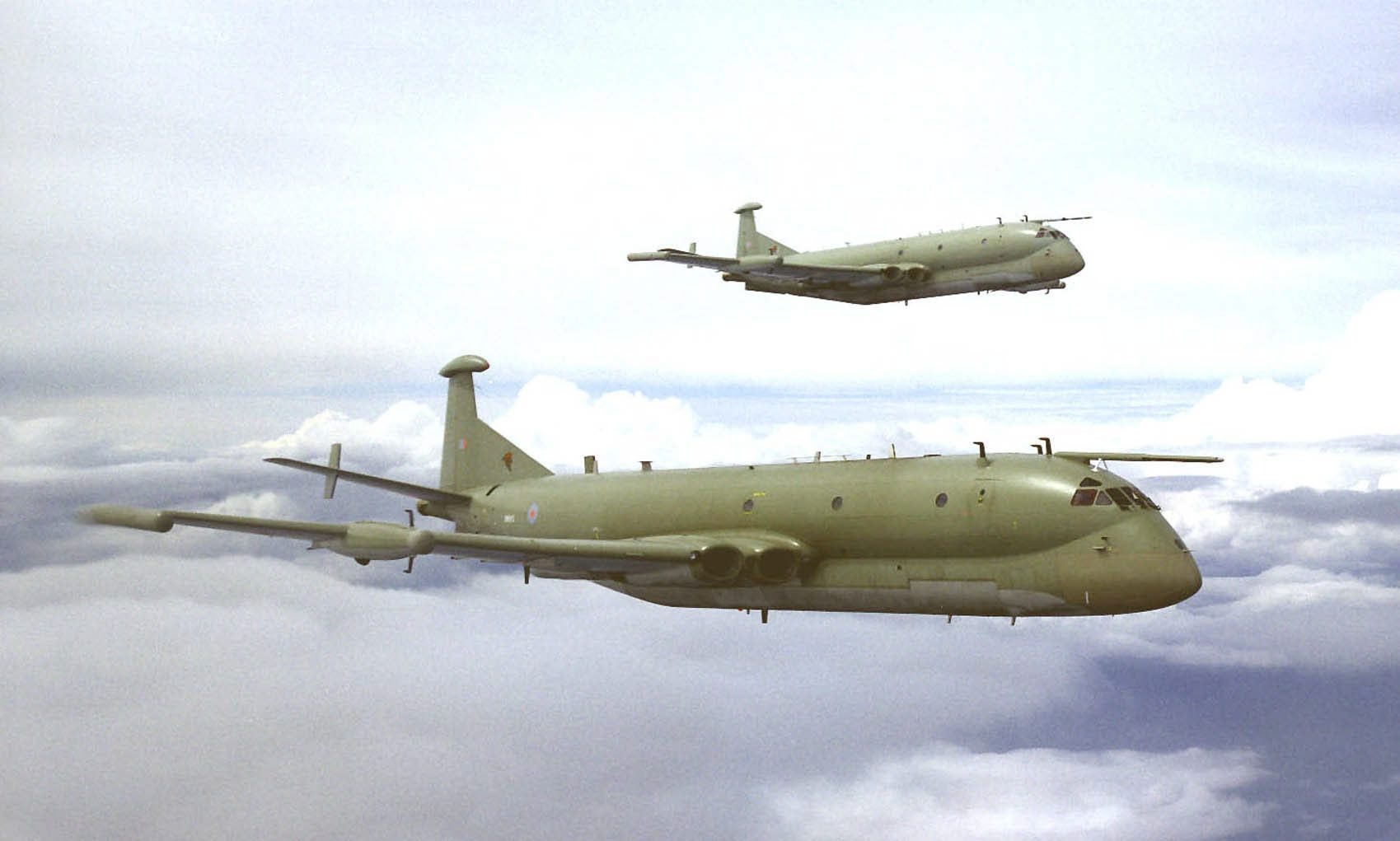
A pair of Nimrod R1s in formation

Data from

General characteristics

- Crew: 29
- Length: 118 ft 0 in (35.97 m)
- Wingspan: 114 ft 10 in (35.00 m)
- Height: 29 ft 9 in (9.07 m)
- Airfoil: root: NACA 63A116 mod; tip: NACA 63A112 mod
- Powerplant: 4 × Rolls-Royce Spey turbofan engines, 12,160 lbf (54.1 kN) thrust each

Performance

- Maximum speed: 500 kn (580 mph, 930 km/h)
- Cruise speed: 426 kn (490 mph, 789 km/h)
- Range: 4,501–5,001 nmi (5,180–5,755 mi, 8,336–9,262 km)
- Service ceiling: 44,000 ft (13,000 m)

Avionics

- EKCO E.290 Radar
- Delco AN/ASN-119 Carousel Inertial Navigation System
- SRIM 6113 Starwindow SIGINT Suite
