= Hawker Siddeley P.139B =

Proposed airborne early warning aircraft

P.139B
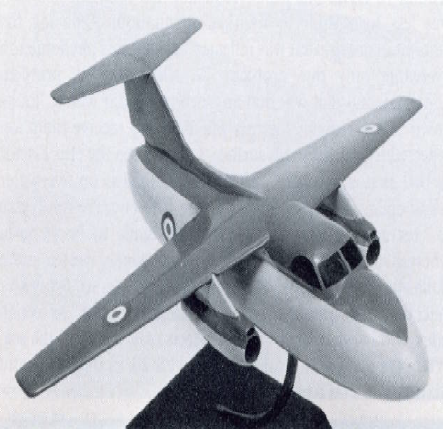
- Model of P.139B

General information
- Type: AEW and COD aircraft
- National origin: United Kingdom
- Manufacturer: Hawker Siddeley
- Status: Cancelled 1966
- Primary user: Royal Navy (Intended)

The Hawker Siddeley P.139B was a proposed airborne early warning aircraft intended to operate from aircraft carriers of the Royal Navy. The P.139B formed part of the a major equipment procurement plan for the RN in the 1960s intended to give the service a force of new, modern carriers capable of operating air groups consisting of equally modern aircraft. However, cuts in defence spending by the British government in the mid-1960s meant that these proposals never came to fruition.

== Background ==
The early 1960s was the zenith of carrier operation for the Royal Navy, as it operated five aircraft carriers, all with air groups consisting of the most modern carrier aircraft available. Despite modernisation, the speed of aircraft development, which led to carrier based aircraft increasing in size, was such that the Royal Navy carrier fleet could not keep up. Owing to the relatively small size of Royal Navy aircraft carriers, with HMS Eagle the largest at 812 feet (247 m), it became necessary for the RN to consider a new generation of aircraft carriers - the CVA-01 - capable of operating new modern aircraft in sufficient numbers to be viable as capable units. The Fleet Air Arm planned the procurement of new aircraft to go with new aircraft carriers. The plan involved three separate areas:

- Air Defence
- Strike
- Airborne Early Warning

=== Airborne Early Warning requirement ===
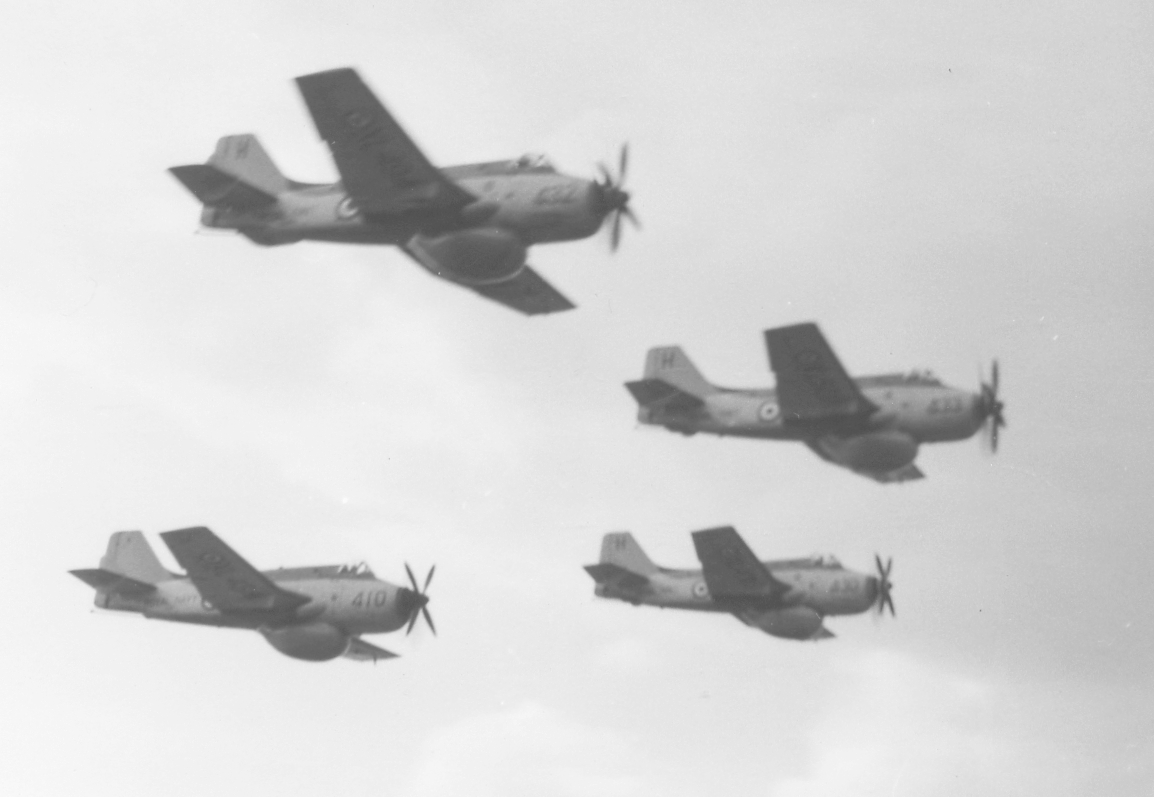
The Gannet AEW.3 was intended as a stop-gap, fitted with the equipment from the obsolete Skyraider, until a purpose built AEW platform could be introduced

In 1959, the FAA had begun to replace the obsolete Douglas Skyraider AEW.1 with a version of the Fairey Gannet antisubmarine aircraft that had been modified into an AEW aircraft as the Fairey Gannet AEW.3. This was intended only as a stop-gap, as it saw the AN/APS-20 S band radar and associated equipment transplanted from the Skyraider to the Gannet. By the time the Gannet was entering service, the AN/APS-20 had been in use for 15 years, having first been developed during the Second World War. By the start of the 1960s it had begun to be superseded by more advanced systems, with the US Navy by then operating the Grumman E-1 Tracer with the AN/APS-82 radar, a development of the APS-20 that was ground stabilised and through its moveable antenna, could determine target height. Even this though was seen as an interim solution, the Grumman E-2 Hawkeye a new, purpose built aircraft with an advanced Pulse-Doppler radar was already in development.

As the Gannet was intended to have a similarly "interim" status to the E-1 Tracer, the Fleet Air Arm entered into a procurement process for an "AEW (Replacement)" platform to eventually supersede the Gannet. The development of the E-2 Hawkeye was a spur to the Royal Navy to begin the development of an equivalent British system as capable as the Hawkeye was expected to be. British aerospace and electronics companies were ordered to begin work on a new British AEW aircraft in 1962.

== Design ==
The P.139B was the result of design work from the former Blackburn Aircraft design team. In 1962, when they set out on the AEW project, they looked primarily at three scanner configurations - a ventral radome, as with the Skyraider and Gannet; a dorsal radome like the E-1 Tracer; and a Fore Aft Scanner System (FASS) that used a pair of radar scanners mounted at the front and rear of the airframe. Having studied all three in detail, it was determined that the FASS was the one that gave the best performance. This led, in 1963, to the P.139 proposal. The P.139 design was not dissimilar to the Lockheed S-3 Viking in being a relatively short, high-wing monoplane with a pair of high-bypass turbofan engines under the wings; the wings were planned to be hinged so that they would fold next to the engines. To accommodate the FASS system, the design had a tailplane initially planned as cruciform tail, before eventually graduating to a full t-tail plan. The plan was for the Frequency Modulated Interrupted Continuous Wave (FMICW) radar system to be installed with a scanner in the nose and one in the tail, giving it a bulbous appearance, which ended up being suspect in wind tunnel tests. The aircraft was also considered for the Carrier Onboard Delivery role, which would have seen the scanners removed, and the nose faired in, while the tail scanner was removed and replaced with a cone shaped freight door to give access to the internal space for freight or passengers.

== Cancellation ==
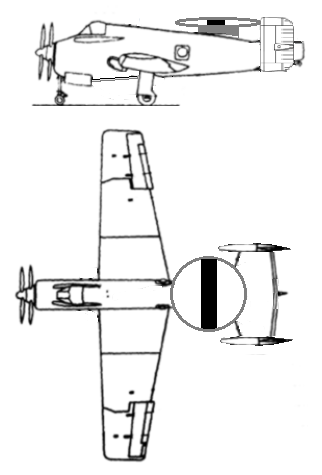
The proposed Gannet AEW.7 would have had a dorsal rotodome and twin tail arrangement.

Owing to the cuts in defence spending that took place during the mid-1960s, it was eventually determined that the development of an entirely British AEW platform for aircraft carriers from scratch was too expensive, and the P.139 project was cancelled in 1964 while the aircraft was still on the drawing board, with the intention of using an existing aircraft design. One proposal was to use the HS.125 with a fixed dorsal radome, similar to that of the E-1 Tracer, while another was to update the Gannet with a new radar system involving a similar configuration to the E-2 Hawkeye. However, the eventual cancellation of the CVA-01 aircraft carrier also led to the cancellation of any kind of new AEW aircraft, leaving the Gannet as the only AEW platform available to the Fleet Air Arm until the final withdrawal of conventional aircraft carriers in 1978.

Following the cancellation of the P.139 project, development of the Fore Aft Scanner System and FMICW radar system was continued to provide the RAF with an AEW capability, as the system was proposed to be installed on the new Nimrod maritime patrol aircraft. Airborne Early Warning capability in the Royal Navy eventually had to pass to helicopters following the final decommissioning of HMS Ark Royal in 1978, as the subsequent Invincible class was incapable of operating conventional fixed wing aircraft.

== Specifications ==
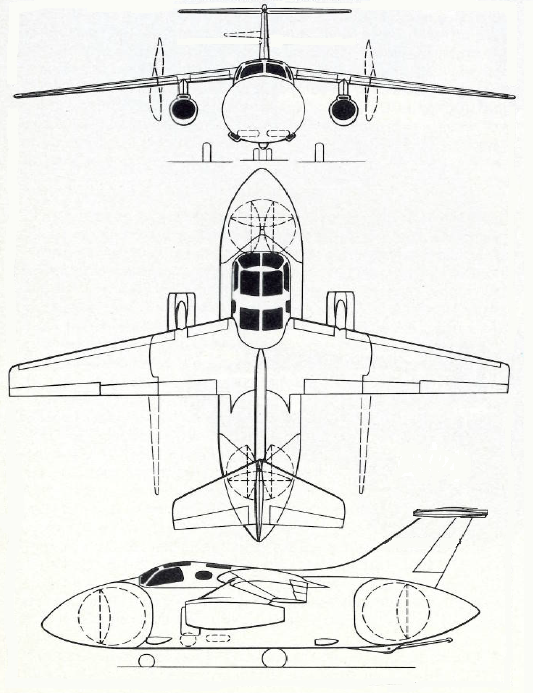
Three way view of P.139B

Data from Aircraft of the Royal Navy Since 1945

General characteristics

- Crew: 4
- Length: 45 ft (14 m)
- Wingspan: 50 ft (15 m)
- Gross weight: 45,000 lb (20,412 kg)
- Powerplant: 2 × turbofan engines

Performance

- Maximum speed: 460 mph (740 km/h, 400 kn)

== See also ==
Aircraft of comparable role, configuration, and era

- Fairey Gannet AEW.3
- Grumman C-2 Greyhound
- Grumman E-2 Hawkeye
