= HMS Centaur (R06) =

1953 Centaur-class light fleet carrier of the Royal Navy

- HMS Centaur on the river Elbe near Hamburg in the 1960s

History

United Kingdom
- Name: HMS Centaur
- Builder: Harland and Wolff
- Laid down: 30 May 1944
- Launched: 22 April 1947
- Commissioned: 1 September 1953
- Decommissioned: 1965
- Home port: HMNB Portsmouth
- Identification: Pennant number: R06
- Fate: Scrapped in 1972-73

General characteristics
- Class & type: Centaur-class aircraft carrier
- Displacement: 22,000 tons standard, 27,000 full load
- Length: 737.75 ft (224.87 m)
- Beam: 123 ft (37 m)
- Draught: 27.8 ft (8.5 m)
- Installed power: 76,000 shp (57,000 kW)
- Propulsion: 4 Admiralty 3-drum boilers, 2 shafts, Parsons geared turbines
- Speed: 28 kn (52 km/h)
- Range: 7,000 nmi (13,000 km) at 18 kn (33 km/h)
- Complement: 1,390 (including air group)
- Sensors & processing systems: Radars, Types 960/965(AW) 982(2 sets) 983 978 293.
- Armament: 2 sextuple Bofors 40 mm anti-aircraft guns; 8 twin Bofors 40 mm; 4 single Bofors 40 mm; 4 single 3-pounder saluting guns
- Armour: 1–2 in (25–51 mm) on flight deck
- Aircraft carried: 42 (decreased to 26 with jet fighters). 1958-60 Sea Hawk & Sea Venom, 1961-63 Sea Vixen FAW1 & Supermarine Scimitar, 1963-65 12 Sea Vixen

HMS Centaur was the first of the four Centaur-class light fleet carriers of the Royal Navy. She was the only ship of her class to be completed with the original design configuration of a straight axial flight deck, rather than the newly invented angled flight decks of her three later sister ships. She was laid down in 1944 in Belfast, with the contract being awarded to Harland and Wolff, but not launched until 22 April 1947 due to delays relating to the end of the war. She was commissioned on 1 September 1953, almost nine years from when she was laid down in 1944.

Centaur saw service throughout the 1950s and early 1960s. Due to budgetary issues Centaur was not converted to a commando carrier like two of her sister ships. Centaur was withdrawn from service in August 1965 and sold for scrapping in 1972.

== Completion ==
Centaur was completed with an axial flight deck, marked by a broken white line running down the middle of the entire length of the flight deck. She began her contractor's sea trials in March 1953 and commissioned on 17 September 1953. Her aviation facilities as completed included 2 x BH5 30,000 lb (14,000 kg) hydraulic catapults at the bow, six 30,000 lb (14,000 kg) arrestor wires, two 35,000 lb (16,000 kg) capacity aircraft lifts, measuring 54 ft × 44 ft (16 m × 13 m) forward and aft. Her single hangar measured 329 by 62 by 17.5 ft (100.3 by 18.9 by 5.3 m), and she had stowage for 349,000 imp gal (1,590,000 L) of AVCAT and Avgas aviation fuel.

Following the completion of her sea and machinery trials in October 1953 she was taken in hand at Portsmouth Dockyard, to be fitted with an interim 5.5-degree angled deck, which was already being added to her as yet uncompleted sister ships, Albion and Bulwark. This required cutting down the port sheerstrake, re-siting the walkways and removing three twin Bofors guns and their directors. Upon completion of this work in April 1954 she was finally able to join the fleet as the first angled-deck carrier in the Royal Navy and undertook her initial flying trials in the English Channel from May to July 1954.

== Operational history ==
=== First commission ===
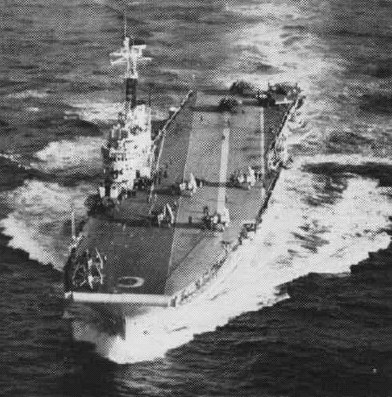
Centaur in 1955

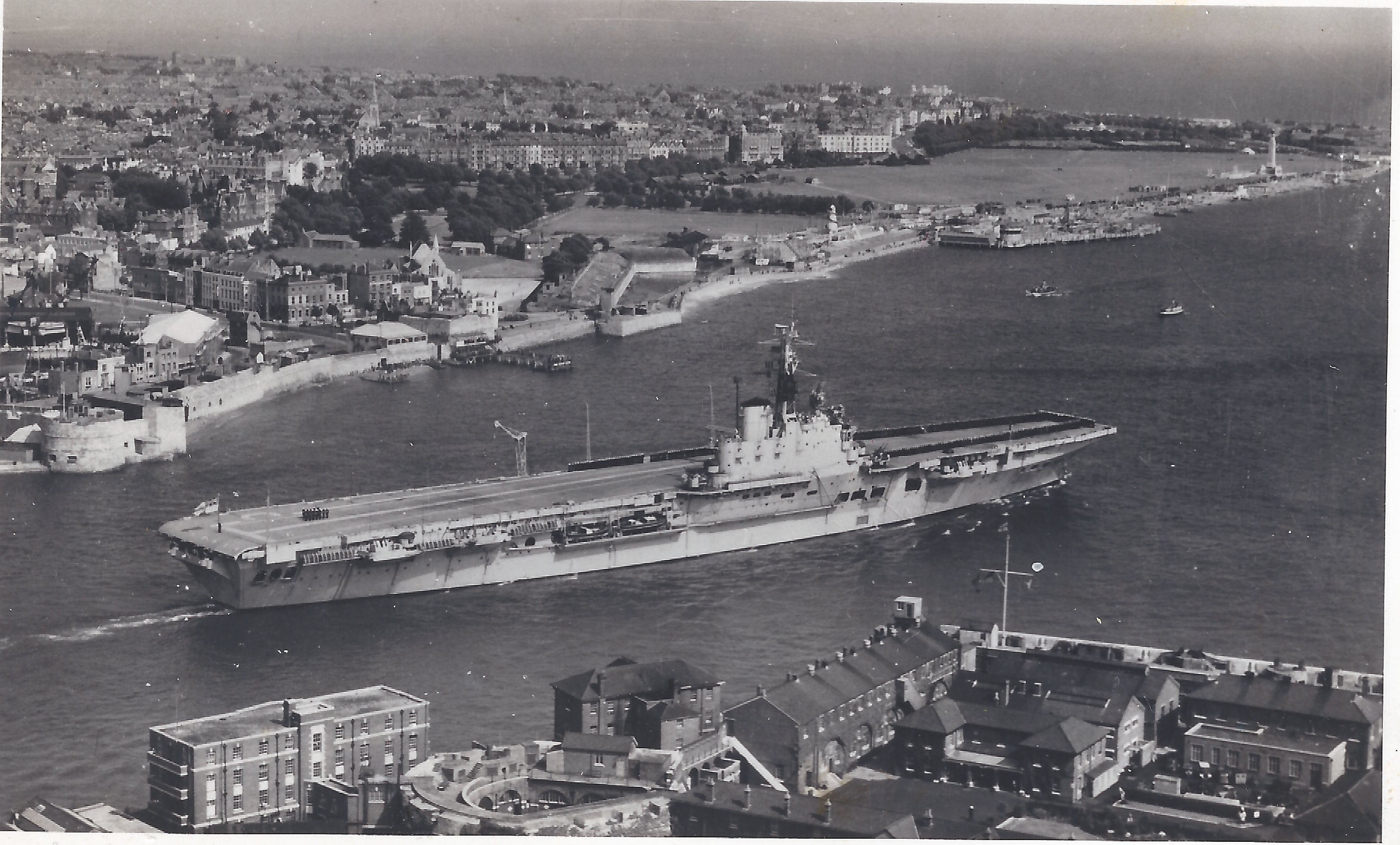
HMS Centaur leaving Portsmouth on July 19th 1954 heading to the Mediterranean.

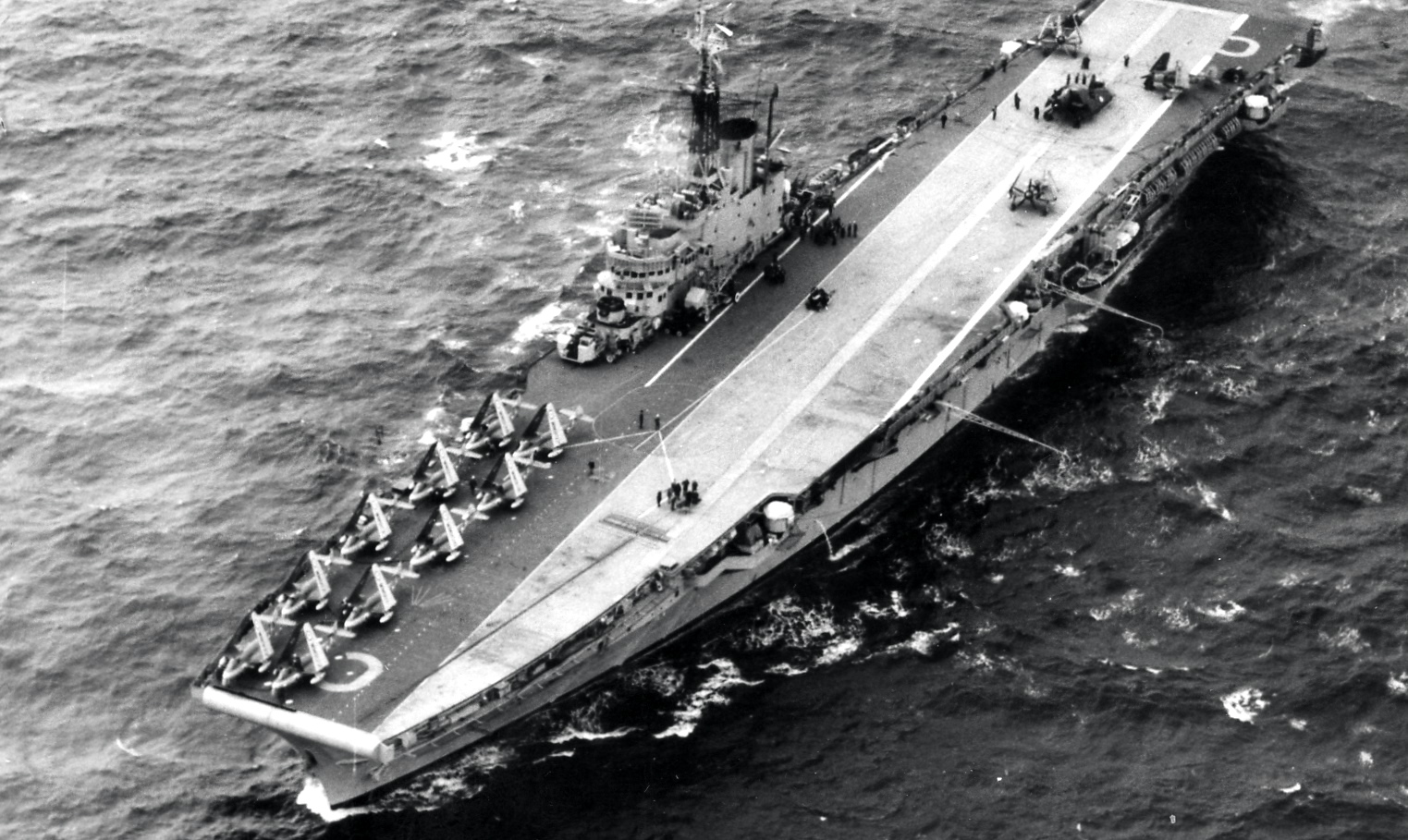
HMS Centaur in the Mediterranean sea September 10, 1954

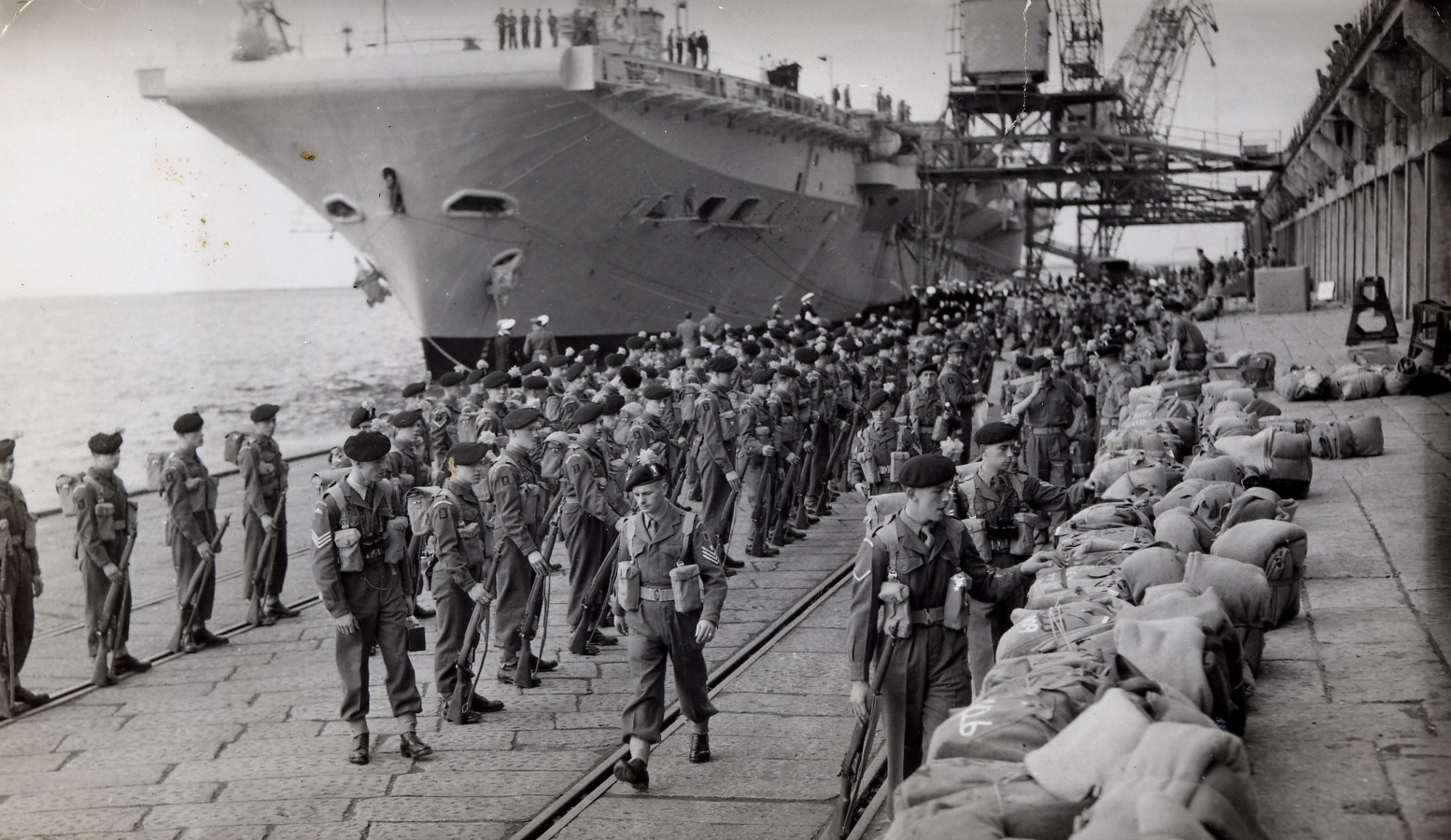
British troops embarking on Centaur in Trieste.

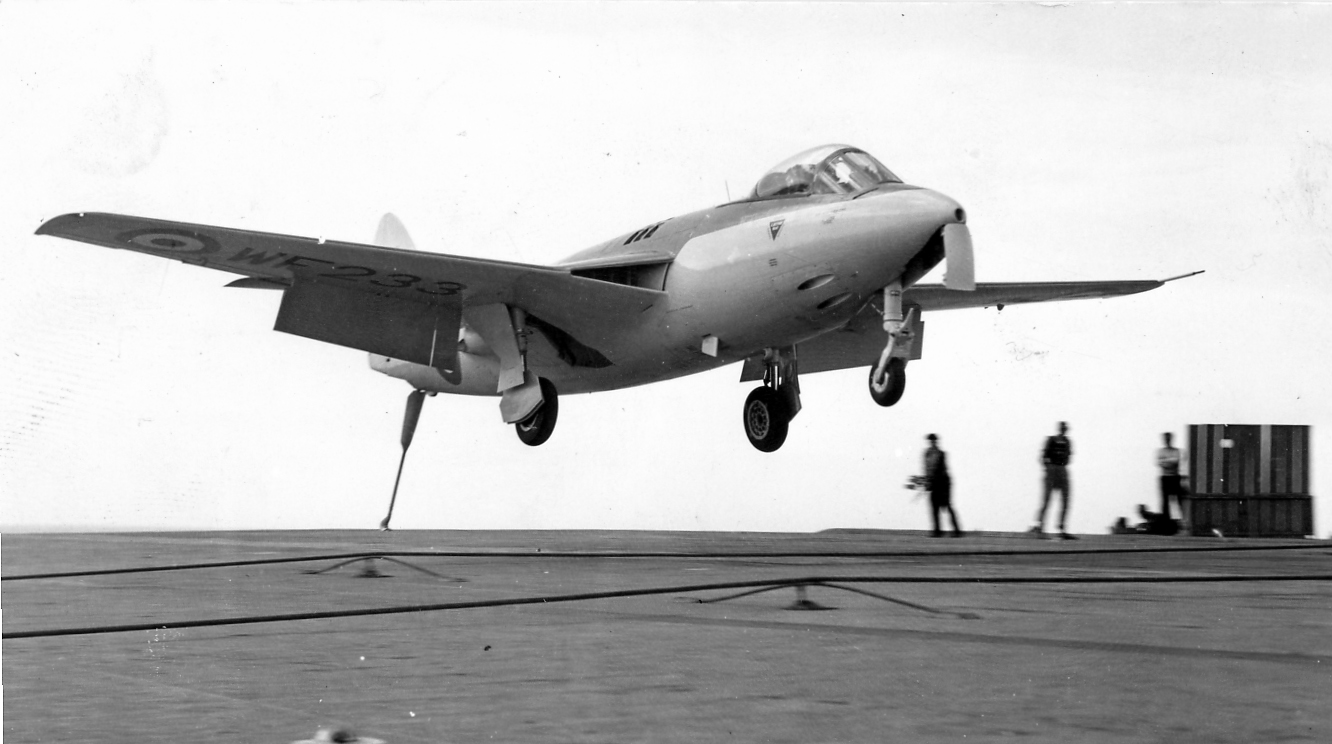
Sea Hawk landing on Centaur

Centaur's initial air group of 25 aircraft, as embarked in July 1954, consisted of nine Hawker Sea Hawk FGA6 of 806 Squadron, nine Hawker Sea Fury FB11 of 810 Squadron, six Grumman Avenger AS anti-submarine aircraft of 820 Squadron and one Westland Dragonfly HR5 of the ship's flight. Centaur was initially intended to join the Mediterranean Fleet for a period of four months, before heading east of Suez to relieve Warrior as the duty carrier in the Far East. As events transpired however, she was to remain in the Mediterranean until June 1955. Her activities during this period included exercises in company with her sister ship Albion and NATO allies, embarking British troops during the withdrawal from Trieste in October 1954, escorting the royal yacht Britannia during a Royal Tour and numerous visits to friendly ports. Whilst at Malta in February 1955 the Sea Furys of 810 Squadron were disembarked and the squadron later flew back to the UK to be disbanded; they were replaced by nine Sea Hawks of 803 Squadron which were transferred from Albion in March 1955. The Avenger AS4s of 820 Squadron were similarly replaced by six Avenger AS5s of 814 Squadron.

From June 1955 until January 1956 Centaur was based in home waters and undertook a range of visits and exercises with other carriers of the fleet. After two months spent in Portsmouth from November 1955 she left for the Far East on 10 January 1956, in company with Albion. Further changes to her air-group saw the Avengers of 814 Squadron replaced by the re-formed 820 Squadron, with six Fairey Gannet AS4s. After passing through the Suez Canal she visited Aden in February to undertake flying exercises with RAF Venoms based at RAF Khormaksar. This was followed by a visit to India, where the two carriers provided flying demonstrations for the Indian government, who were at that time interested in acquiring an aircraft carrier for the Indian Navy. This eventually resulted in the purchase, the following year, of the incomplete Majestic-class aircraft carrier Hercules, completed in 1961 to an updated design as INS Vikrant. Further exercises were carried out in the Indian Ocean, before heading east to visit Hong Kong and Singapore. She crossed the line for the first time on 26 April en route back from Singapore to Devonport via Suez and Malta, arriving on 15 May 1956.

=== Modernisation ===
In the mid-1950s Government Defence Policy was to maintain a fleet of four active aircraft carriers to meet both NATO and Imperial commitments. In practice this meant a total fleet of five to six ships, allowing for refits, modernisation and training. The rapid advances in naval aviation technology during this period, such as the angled deck, steam catapults and mirror landing sight, coupled with the planned introduction of the new, heavier second-generation jet fighters such as the Supermarine Scimitar and De Havilland Sea Vixen, rendered the existing carrier fleet obsolescent. Only Ark Royal (completed in 1955), the rebuilt Victorious, and under-construction Hermes, due to join the fleet in 1958 and 1959 respectively, had the capability to operate the new aircraft. Thus it was decided to rebuild Eagle from 1959 to 1964 to the same standard as Victorious and Hermes, followed by a similar upgrade to Ark Royal. This left a potential period of five years between 1959 and 1964 when a maximum of three carriers would be available. The Admiralty therefore searched for an interim solution to bridge this feared gap.

The design limitations of the three Centaur-class carriers completed in 1953-4 meant that a rebuild to the standard adopted for the other carriers would be difficult, if not impossible. A particular problem was the lack of hangar deck strength, which when the ships were ordered in 1943, was specified to handle 30,000 lb (14,000 kg) aircraft. A fully loaded Sea Vixen FAW1 could weigh up to 35,000 lb (16,000 kg) and the Scimitar up to 34,200 lb (15,500 kg). This would mean that in operation these aircraft would have to be armed and fuelled on the flight deck. Nonetheless, no other hulls were available, and given the potential "gap", a quick solution was needed. It was therefore decided that one Centaur-class would be given a limited modernisation, to give her the minimum capability to operate these aircraft. Centaur herself was selected for this purpose in May 1956.

Between June 1956 and August 1958 Centaur underwent her partial modernisation at Devonport Dockyard. This involved the installation of two 139-foot (42 m) BS4 40,000 lb (18,000 kg) steam catapults forward, the removal of the Bofors guns on the flight deck, improved air operations facilities and the addition of a Type 963 blind-landing radome at the rear of the island. Some work was also done on a further slight extension on the port side, to enable a six-degree angled flight deck to be used. Her arrestor cables were not upgraded at this stage, however. This was rectified in her 1960–1961 refit, when five 35,000 lb (16,000 kg) arrestor wires were fitted.

=== Second commission ===
Centaur recommissioned at Devonport on 3 September 1958, under the command of Captain Horace Law. Following the completion of post-refit ship trials in the Channel and South-West Approaches in November, she embarked her air group in preparation for her flying trials, which included visits from both Sea Vixens and Scimitars as well as two Gannet AEW3s. In January 1959 she embarked her full air-group, consisting of fourteen Hawker Sea Hawk FGA6s of 801 Squadron, eight Sea Venom FAW22s of 891 Squadron, eight Westland Whirlwind HS7s of 845 Squadron and four Douglas Skyraider AEW1s of D Flight 849 Squadron.

From January to March she operated with the Mediterranean Fleet based in Malta, before proceeding to the North Atlantic to take part in Exercise Dawn Breeze IV, in company with Eagle and the recently rebuilt and re-commissioned Victorious. During March the Whirlwind helicopters of 845 Squadron were landed due to technical problems with their engines and she re-embarked Dragonflies to carry out search and rescue duties. Six Gannet AS4s of 810 NAS were also embarked from June 1959, to provide anti-submarine capability.

In April 1959 Centaur was used during the making of the film Sink the Bismarck! to depict flight operations from both Royal Navy aircraft carriers Victorious and Ark Royal; (her post-war pennant number R06 is clear in both scenes). Three surviving Fairey Swordfish biplanes were restored and flown from her decks, and scenes were also shot on the bridge of the carrier and in the aircrew briefing room. One of the Swordfish was piloted by the test pilot Peter Twiss.

After her brief spell in the limelight, Centaur spent a few weeks in home waters, carrying out flying operations, and paid visits to Copenhagen, Denmark and Brest, France, before departing for the Mediterranean via Lisbon and Gibraltar. Whilst at Gibraltar, further changes to her air-group were made as the Skyraiders of 849D Squadron were disembarked, whilst the Gannets of 810 Squadron rejoined the ship. Following a transit through the Suez Canal in late June she operated in the Indian Ocean with visits to Kuwait, Aden and Trincomalee, Ceylon (now Sri Lanka), where she was visited by the prime minister, Solomon Bandaranaike, shortly before his assassination in September 1959. After a month-long maintenance period in Singapore, she operated in Pacific waters for the next three and a half months, including joint exercises with USS Lexington off the Philippines and a visit to Australia, before returning to Singapore. Further operations in the Indian Ocean, including a visit to East Africa, followed before she left to return home, being replaced as the east of Suez carrier by Albion. She arrived back at Devonport on 26 April, having steamed 80,916 nautical miles (149,856 km) and carried out 7,805 catapult launches, for the loss of one Sea Hawk, two Sea Venoms and a Dragonfly helicopter of the ship's flight.

=== Third commission ===
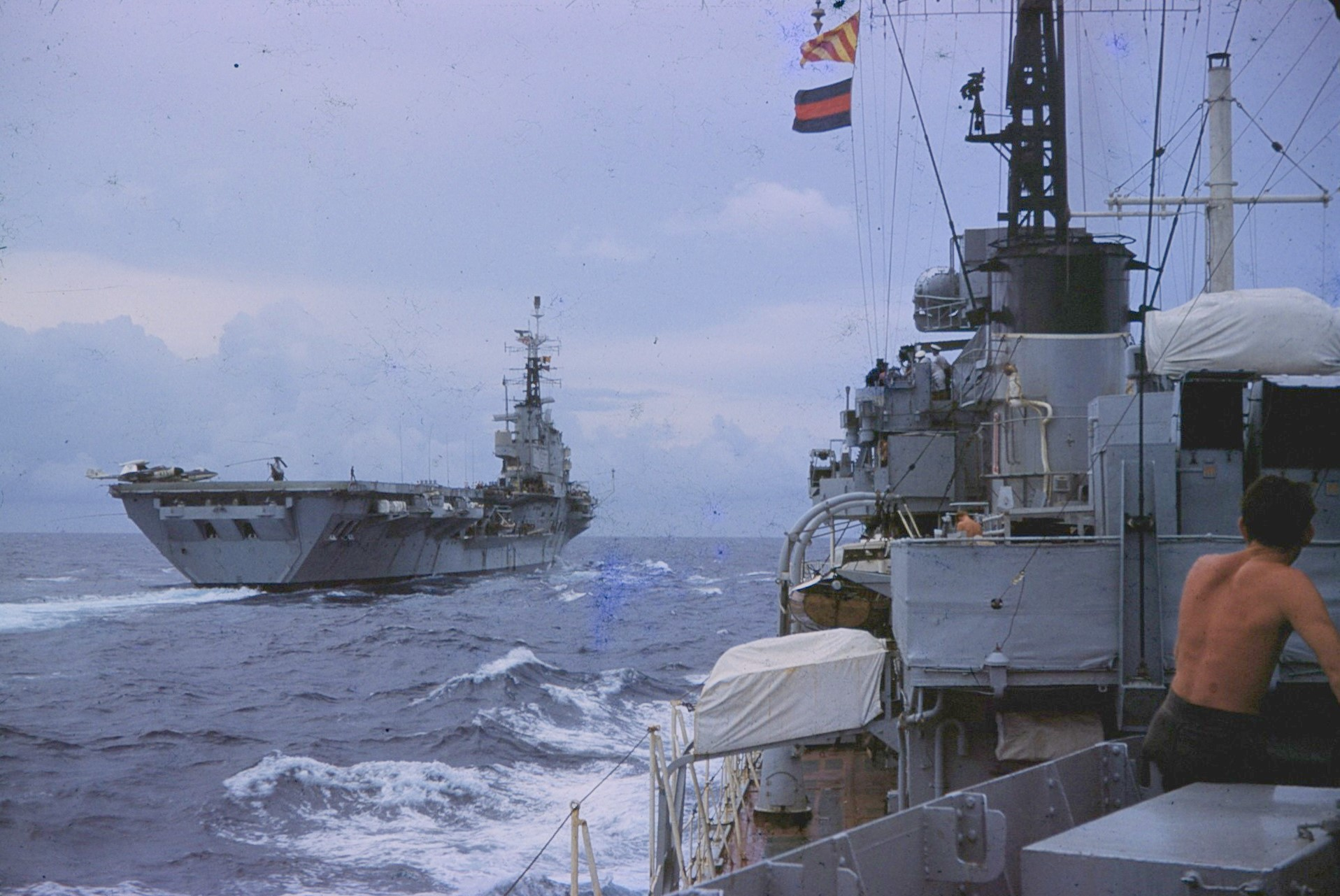
Centaur in 1961, en route from Aden to Ceylon. Photographed from HMS Solebay

Centaur was refitted at Portsmouth from September 1960 until March 1961, during which the upgraded arrestor wires were fitted and additional air-conditioning units installed. Following sea-trials off Portland in March, she embarked her new air group during April, consisting of between six and eight Scimitar F1 of 807 Squadron, between six and nine Sea Vixen FAW1 of 893 Squadron, four Fairey Gannet AEW3 of 849 Squadron, A Flight, and eight Whirlwind HAS7 of 824 Squadron.

During April she sailed for the Mediterranean to continue flying exercises with her new air-group and met Hermes for the first time at Gibraltar. Although she was originally scheduled to cross the North Atlantic for a visit to the US and Canada, events in the Middle East were to lead to a rapid change of plans.

In June 1961 President Abd al-Karim Qasim of Iraq announced that Kuwait would be annexed by Iraq; the Emir of Kuwait requested assistance from the United Kingdom and Saudi Arabia. The UK activated Operation Vantage and immediately sent Victorious and accompanying vessels. Bulwark landed a company of 42 Commando, Royal Marines at Kuwait airport. Centaur arrived from Malta in July to relieve Victorious on patrol in the Gulf. Iraq recognised Kuwaiti sovereignty in 1963, after Kassim had been killed in a coup.

With a reduction in tension following the decisive action of the Royal Navy to deter the would-be aggressor, Centaur was ordered to return to station off Aden, and subsequently returned home to Devonport in September, for a six-week maintenance period. During October she re-embarked her air-group and headed back through the Mediterranean to the Indian Ocean, to once again relieve Victorious as the duty carrier East of Suez in December. This duty saw visits to Mombasa (Kenya), Aden, Singapore and Hong Kong. In early December she was engaged in flood relief work in Kenya, where the Tana River had burst its banks. Her Whirlwinds helped to ferry essential supplies to the cut-off areas and temporary camps. There was also a brief return to the Gulf in December 1961 when President Kassim of Iraq resumed threats against Kuwait, before backing down again. Centaur was relieved as the duty carrier by Ark Royal at the end of March and began her journey home.

During May 1962 her air group was disembarked as she entered a short maintenance period in Portsmouth Dockyard. 807 squadron was disbanded at this time, following a decision to phase out the Scimitar in favour of the Blackburn Buccaneer. Centaur lacked the capacity to operate the Buccaneer; however, the removal of the Scimitar Squadron did enable her to operate an enlarged squadron of twelve Sea Vixens instead.

On 18 June 1962 a new commanding officer, Captain Philip G Sharp, took over the ship, before she sailed to take part in exercises in the North Sea, following which she departed for Gibraltar. The rest of the summer was spent in the Mediterranean, including a three-week refit in Gibraltar, before she returned to home waters in October. On 19 November, whilst exercising in the Irish Sea, there was a sudden loss of pressure in "A" Boiler Room, which in turn led to a loss of power on the port engine and tripped lighting and radar circuits. This was caused by the burst of a main steam-pipe in the boiler room and superheated steam at 700 °F (371 °C) and at a pressure of up to 500 psi (3,400 kPa) escaping and killing, instantly, the five crew members on duty at the time in the boiler room. Engineering staff isolated the affected boiler, and later that morning a rescue team wearing asbestos suits were able to recover the bodies of their ship-mates. Later that day their coffins, wrapped in Union Jacks, were flown off to RAF Valley, and a memorial service was held. Centaur returned to Portsmouth on 27 November for repairs that lasted until 22 January.

After working up with her air-group in the Channel, during which a Sea Vixen of 893 Squadron was lost with her crew, Centaur took part in further emergency relief work, this time at home, carrying supplies for isolated communities in Wales and Northern Ireland, cut off by the severe blizzards of the Winter of 1963. On 13 February 1963 she was ordered to proceed east of Suez to provide cover for Hermes, which had been detailed to provide support for forces loyal to the Sultan of Brunei, following the Indonesian backed revolt, thus starting what became known as the Indonesian confrontation. She passed through the Suez Canal on 1 March and spent the next two months in the Indian Ocean, during a period of high tension following the February coup in Iraq, which had resulted in the removal of President Kassim. Centaur was finally ordered to return home, arriving in Portsmouth on 22 May.

There had been speculation during this period that Centaur would be converted to a Commando Carrier, similar to her sister-ships, as the MacMillan government had originally only planned to keep her in service until Eagle rejoined the fleet in 1963/64. However, the decision to keep 2 carriers available for service east of Suez meant that she would serve longer than originally intended in the fixed-wing role.

=== Fourth commission ===
Centaur was refitted in Portsmouth Dockyard between June and November 1963, during which she was fitted with a large Mirror Landing Sight on a sponson on the port-side of the flight deck and a Type 965 air search radar was installed on a lattice foremast (taken from the Air Direction Destroyer Battleaxe, which had been earmarked for disposal, after being badly damaged in a collision the previous year) at the front of her island. More air-conditioning units were also installed and further improvements were made to her Operations Room. Whilst alongside in Portsmouth in October she sustained slight damage to her bow, when the submarine HMS Porpoise collided with her after being caught by the ebb tide.

She re-commissioned on 15 November 1963. Her final, twenty-two strong, air-group was embarked shortly afterwards, consisting of twelve Sea Vixen FAW1 of 892 Squadron, four Gannet AEW3 of 849 Squadron, A Flight, and the ships flight of one Whirlwind. She also occasionally embarked small detachments of Scimitars seconded from other squadrons. She was destined to be sent to the Far East, however before departing she undertook an emergency mission from 23 to 24 December, to assist the Greek cruise liner TSMS Lakonia, which had caught fire near Madeira. Centaur's helicopter helped to recover the victims of the tragedy, which claimed the lives of 128 passengers and crew; their bodies were disembarked on the ships lighter at Gibraltar on Christmas Day 1963 .

After a quick passage through the Mediterranean and the Suez Canal, she arrived off Aden in January to continue her work-up, during which time she embarked the six Wessex helicopters of 815 Squadron from RAF Khormaksar to complete her air-group. She was also engaged in providing air support for Operations Damon and Nutcracker, an attempt to put down a rebellion in the Radfan region of Aden.

In January 1964 a mutiny occurred in Tanganyika. The 1st Tanganyika Rifles, who were based near the capital Dar-es-Salaam, had mutinied against their British officers, as well as seizing the British High Commissioner and taking over the airport. Britain decided, after urgent appeals for help from President Julius Nyerere, to deploy Centaur accompanied by 815 Naval Air Squadron along with 45 Commando of the Royal Marines. When Centaur arrived at Dar-es-Salaam, a company of Royal Marines was landed by helicopter on a football field next to the barracks of the mutineers. The company assaulted the barracks with full force in a chaotic but swift attack. After a call for the mutinous soldiers to surrender failed, the company demolished the front of the guardroom with a shot from an anti-tank rocket launcher, which resulted in a large number of distressed soldiers pouring out into the open. Later, four Sea Vixens from Centaur provided cover for more Royal Marines, who were landed on an air strip. The operation was a success and the rest of the mutineers surrendered, with the main culprits being arrested. Many Tanganyikans were jubilant when the country was restored to a stable and peaceful condition. The Royal Marine Band displayed the British forces appreciation of the friendly welcome they had received from the Tanganyikans while restoring the country to stability, by taking part in a heavy schedule of parades through the streets of Tanganyika. Centaur left on 29 January, nine days after originally sailing for what was then a country in crisis.

Centaur completed her work-up during February in the South China Sea. and spent the next three months in the region, which included a high-profile visit to Singapore to deter threatened Indonesian aggression against Singapore and the newly formed Malaysian Federation. During May Centaur was ordered to return to the Indian Ocean to provide further support in Aden, where the Radfan rebellion was escalating into a major conflict. Her Wessex helicopters were used to replace RAF Belvedere's suffering from engine failures.

During the summer her Sea Vixens undertook air strikes against the rebel forces in Radfan, helping to bring the campaign to a successful conclusion. Whilst exercising off Penang on 11 July, one of her Sea Vixen's and its crew were lost. A Gannet sent to search for the missing fighter was also lost although its crew were rescued. From 26 July she participated in exercise FOTEX 64 with other units of the fleet in the South China Seas, later joining with the Royal Australian Navy aircraft carrier, HMAS Melbourne in Exercise Stopwatch during August. During September she became directly involved in what became known as the Indonesian Confrontation, when Indonesian troops were parachuted near the town of Labis, and sea-landings were made on the west coast of the Malayan peninsula. The invaders were quickly captured, however Centaur took station to prevent any further incursions in that area. She remained in the far-east until 25 November when she began the journey home for Christmas.

During a refit that lasted until March 1965 it was announced that Centaur would be withdrawn from service later that year, the first of the Royal Navy's modern carrier fleet to be withdrawn. A deployment to the Mediterranean during April, May and June included a number of high-profile port visits and exercises with the fleet, as well as close encounters with the Soviet Black Sea Fleet. She returned to the UK during July and undertook a series of farewell visits to various ports and participated in a Royal Review of the Home Fleet in the Clyde during August. She returned to Portsmouth on 24 August 1965 and was open for visits by the public during Navy Days, before paying off for the last time on 27 September 1965.

=== Final years ===
Pressures on the Defence Budget meant that there was no money available to further modernise Centaur nor convert her to a Commando Carrier; such funds and resources as might have been available, were already committed to converting the Tiger Class Cruisers to become rudimentary Helicopter Carriers. Her use to the Navy was not quite over however, as she was consigned to the role of an accommodation ship for the crew of Victorious while the latter ship undertook a refit. In 1966, Centaur was towed to Devonport and was again used as an accommodation ship, this time for the aircraft carrier Eagle, while that ship was also refitted. In 1967 she was used as a tender for the RN Barracks, HMS Drake at Devonport, and was towed back to Portsmouth later that year, to act as an accommodation ship for Hermes during the latter ships' refit. In 1970, she was towed to Devonport, where after another spell as an accommodation ship, and with her condition now deteriorating significantly, she was put on the disposal list. She was sold on 11 August 1972 to Queenborough Shipbreaking Company, and shortly afterwards she was towed to Cairnryan and broken up.

== See also ==
- Fleet Air Arm

== Publications ==
- Askins, Simon (2008). From the Cockpit No. 7: Fairey Gannet. Ad Hoc Publications.
- Colledge, J. J.; Warlow, Ben (2006) [1969]. Ships of the Royal Navy: The Complete Record of All Fighting Ships of the Royal Navy from the 15th Century to the Present (3rd Rev ed.). London: Chatham Publishing. ISBN 978-1-86176-281-8. OCLC 67375475.
- Friedman, Norman (1988). British Carrier Aviation: The Evolution of the Ships and Their Aircraft. Naval Institute Press.
- Hobbs, David (2013). British Aircraft Carriers: Design, Development and Service Histories. Seaforth Publishing. ("Hobbs BAC")
- Hobbs, David (2015). The British Carrier Strike Fleet after 1945. Seaforth Publishing. ("Hobbs BCS")
- Janes Fighting Ships 1958-59.
- McCart, Neil (1997). HMS Centaur, 1943-1972. Fan Publications.
- Sturtivant, Ray; Battle, Theo (1984). The Squadrons of the Fleet Air Arm. Air-Britain Publications.
- Thetford, Owen (1982). British Naval Aircraft Since 1912. Putnam.
- Walton, A.C. "Royal Navy Aircraft Carriers, Part 3". Archived from the original on 11 October 2012.
