= Fairey Gannet AEW.3 =

British airborne early warning aircraft

Gannet AEW.3
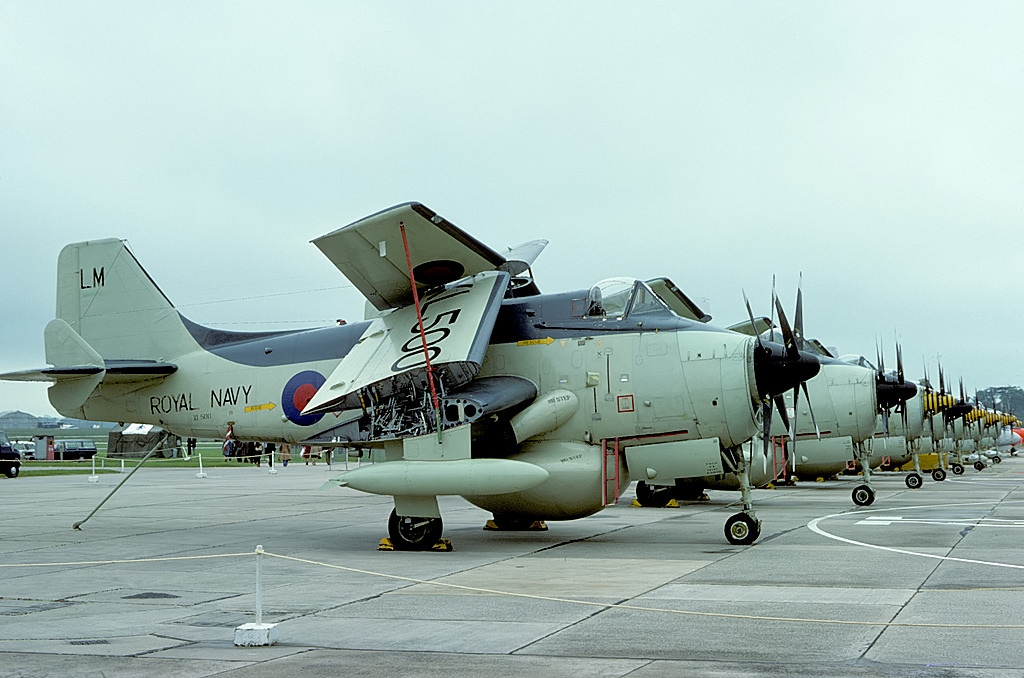
- Gannets lined up on the apron at RAF Lossiemouth in 1977

General information
- Type: Airborne early warning aircraft
- National origin: United Kingdom
- Manufacturer: Fairey Aviation Company
- Primary user: Royal Navy
- Number built: 44

History
- Manufactured: 1958–1963
- Introduction date: August 1959
- First flight: 20 August 1958
- Retired: 15 December 1978 (Note: 849 Naval Air Squadron flying Gannet COD.4 aircraft from Ark Royal and RAF Lossiemouth)
- Developed from: Fairey Gannet

The Fairey Gannet AEW.3 is a variant of the Fairey Gannet anti-submarine warfare aircraft intended to be used in the airborne early warning (AEW) role on aircraft carriers of the Royal Navy. It was introduced to service in 1959 to replace the obsolete Douglas Skyraider, and was intended as an interim solution until the planned introduction of a new, purpose built AEW platform for use on the planned CVA-01 aircraft carriers. Neither the new aircraft carriers nor the new AEW aircraft were proceeded with, and the Gannet AEW.3 remained in service until the last aircraft carrier that could operate it was retired in 1978.

== Design and development ==
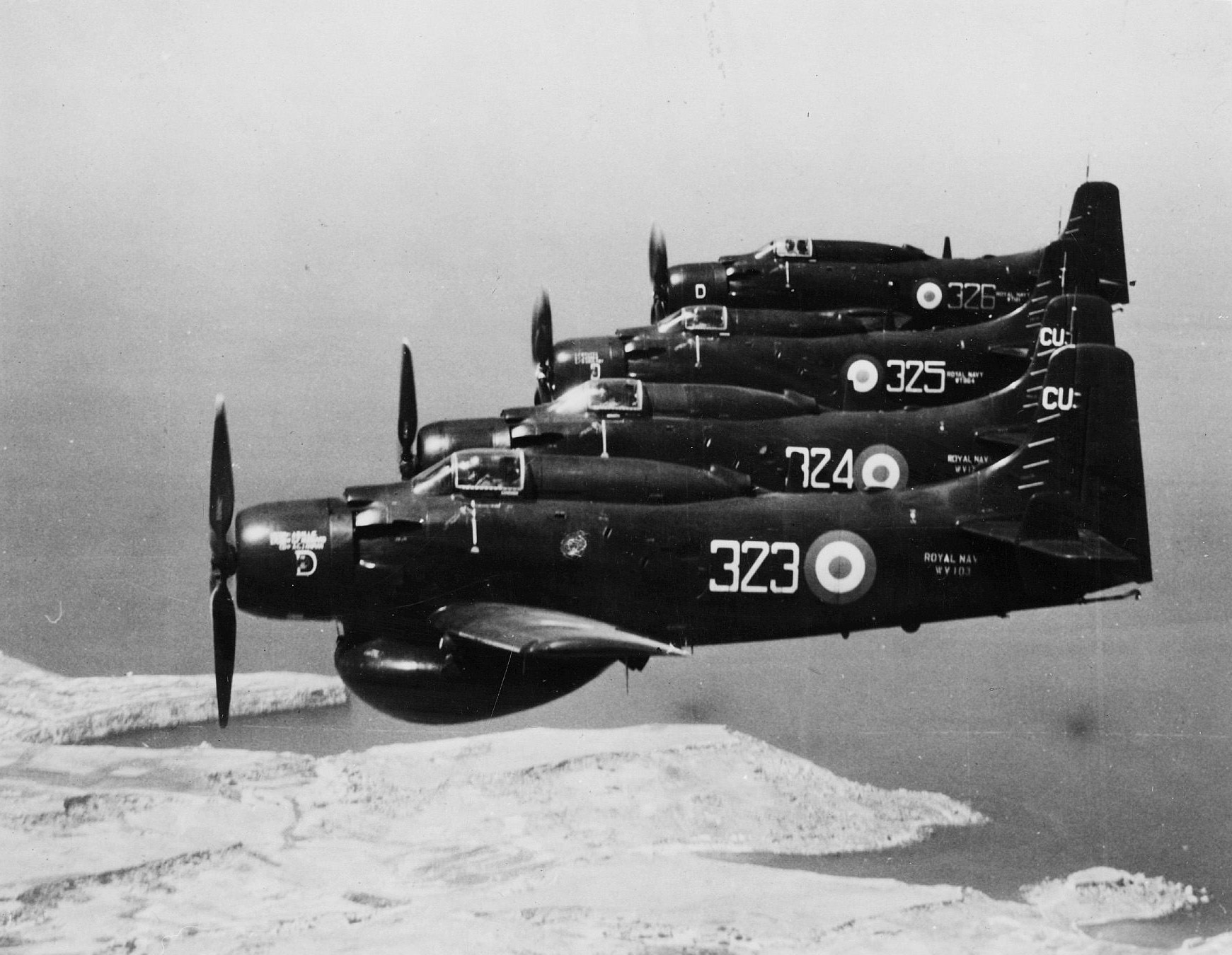
The Douglas Skyraider had been in service since the early 1950s, but was rapidly becoming obsolete

In the late 1950s, the Royal Navy operated the piston-engined Douglas A-1 Skyraider from its aircraft carriers in the AEW role. However, the Skyraider was a design that originated during the Second World War. It entered service with the RN in 1951 but, owing to its World War II vintage, would be considered obsolete by the late 50s. As a consequence, the Royal Navy issued its directive AEW.154 to begin planning for a replacement for the Skyraider. The aircraft considered most suitable for this were seen as those already under development for the Navy's GR.17/45 Specification for a new anti-submarine aircraft, of which the front runners were the Blackburn B-54/B-88 and the Fairey Type Q/17. In this competition, it was the Fairey Aviation aircraft that proved the winner, eventually entering service as the Gannet.

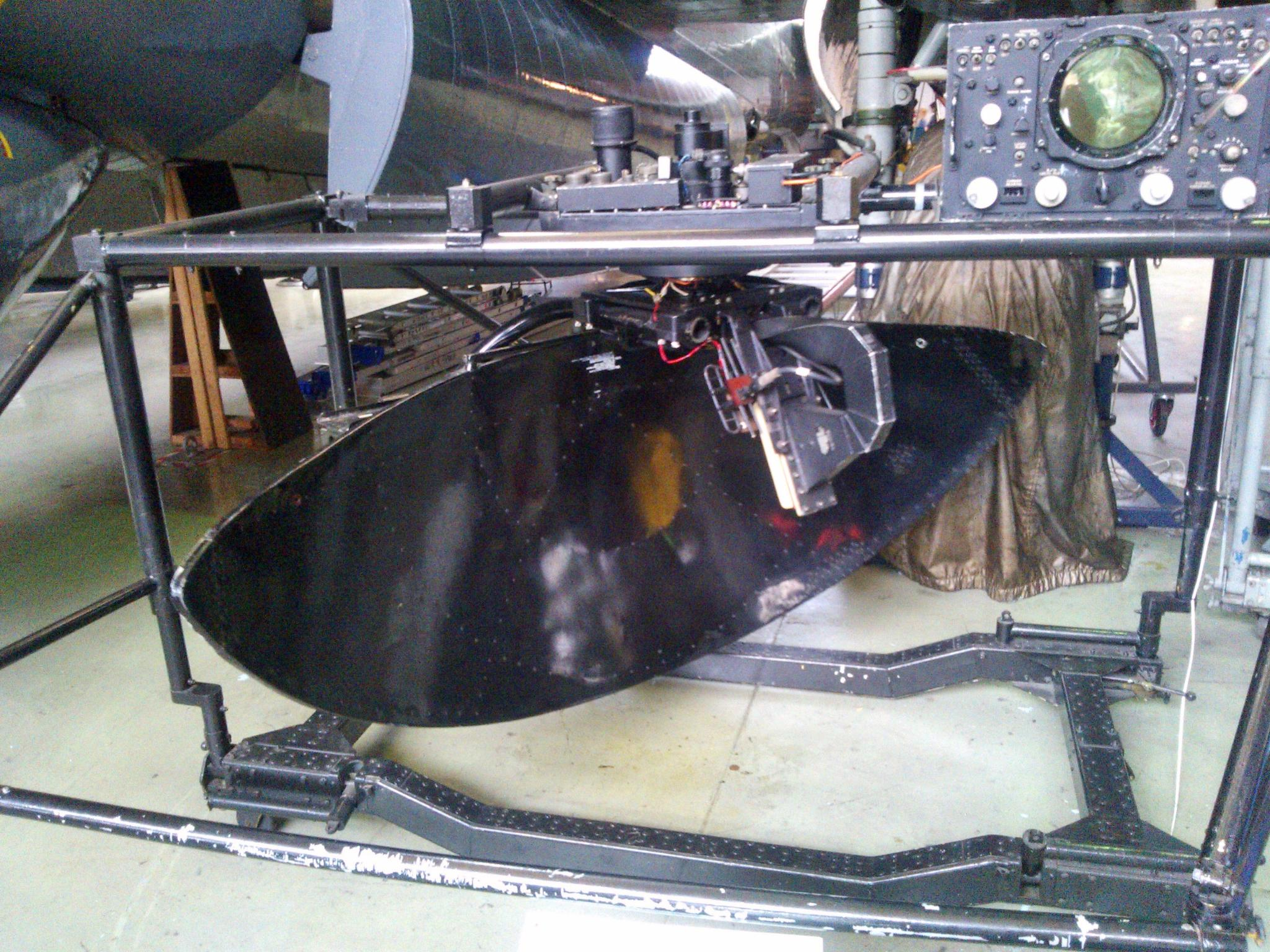
AN/APS-20 Radar Scanner

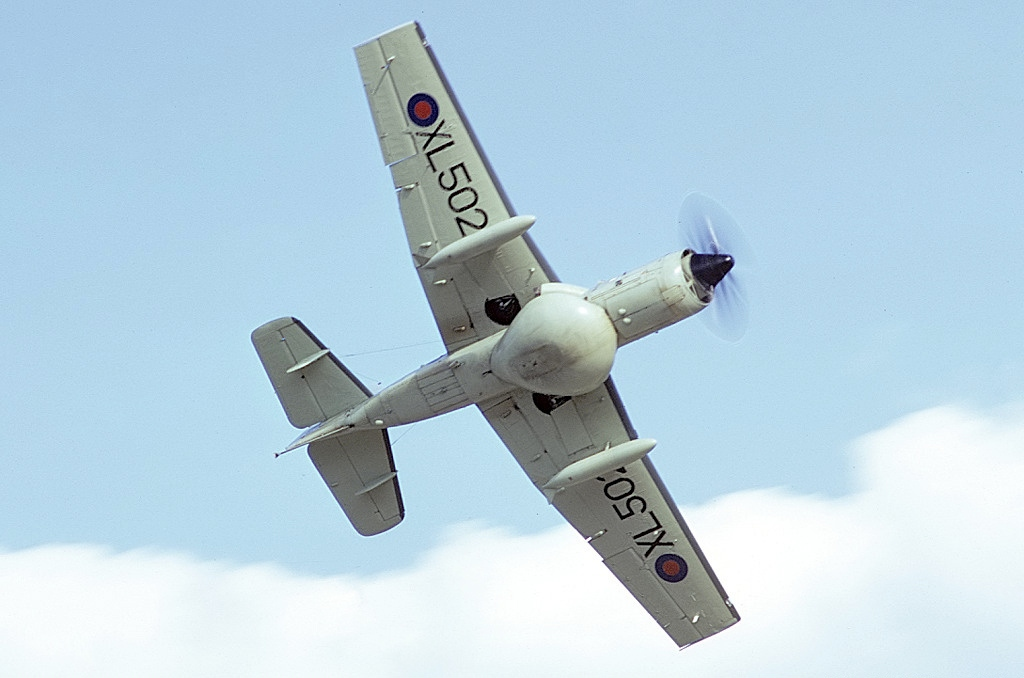
The large size of the Gannet's radome can be seen

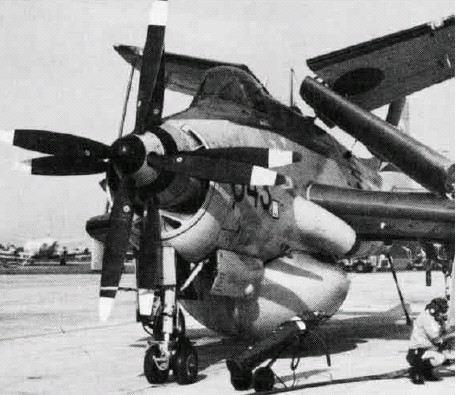
No. 849 Squadron Gannet AEW.3 showing wing folding system.

The intention was to use the Gannet as a stop-gap measure prior to the acquisition of a new, purpose built system intended to be used on the planned new generation of aircraft carriers. As a consequence, it was intended to undertake as little in the way of modification as possible – the AN/APS-20 radar from the Skyraider would be mounted in a radome under the fuselage of an ordinary Gannet AS.1, with the associated electronics and space for two operators inside. However, the size of the radome meant that the existing airframe was too close to the ground to accommodate the radar, and so a significant modification to the fuselage was required. This involved removing the observer's cockpits and creating a new cabin within the fuselage; this was accessed via a pair of hatches next to the trailing edge of the wing, which also meant that the exhausts had to be moved from this position to the leading edge; increasing the total area of the vertical stabiliser to compensate for the instability caused by the radome; and extending the length of the undercarriage to increase the clearance for the radome, which consequently increased the aircraft's overall height by 3 ft (1 m), and gave the aircraft a more level stance than the anti-submarine version. Such were the extensive modifications required that, in December 1954, it was suggested that the AEW version be renamed as the Fairey Albatross, as it was to all intents and purposes a completely different aircraft from its ASW predecessor. As it was, by the time the Gannet AEW was entering service, the ASW version was in the process of being replaced, avoiding any potential confusion.

The prototype Gannet AEW.3 first flew in August 1958, with carrier trials taking place using HMS Centaur in November, and the first production aircraft delivered in December. By August 1959, 700G Naval Air Squadron was formed as the Trials Unit for the new Gannet. This unit put the aircraft through an intensive test programme to make it ready for operation service, a process that lasted until January 1960, at which point the unit was renamed as 'A' Flight of 849 Naval Air Squadron. 849A Flight was then declared operational and was embarked for the first time in HMS Ark Royal. A total of 44 Gannets were ordered for the Royal Navy to replace the Skyraider.

Standard and Airborne Early Warning versions compared
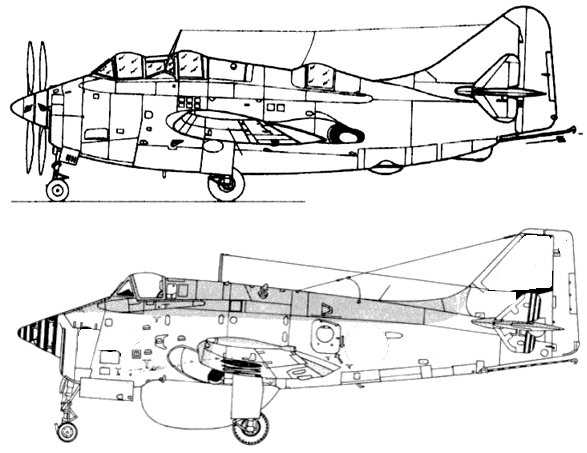
ASW and AEW variants

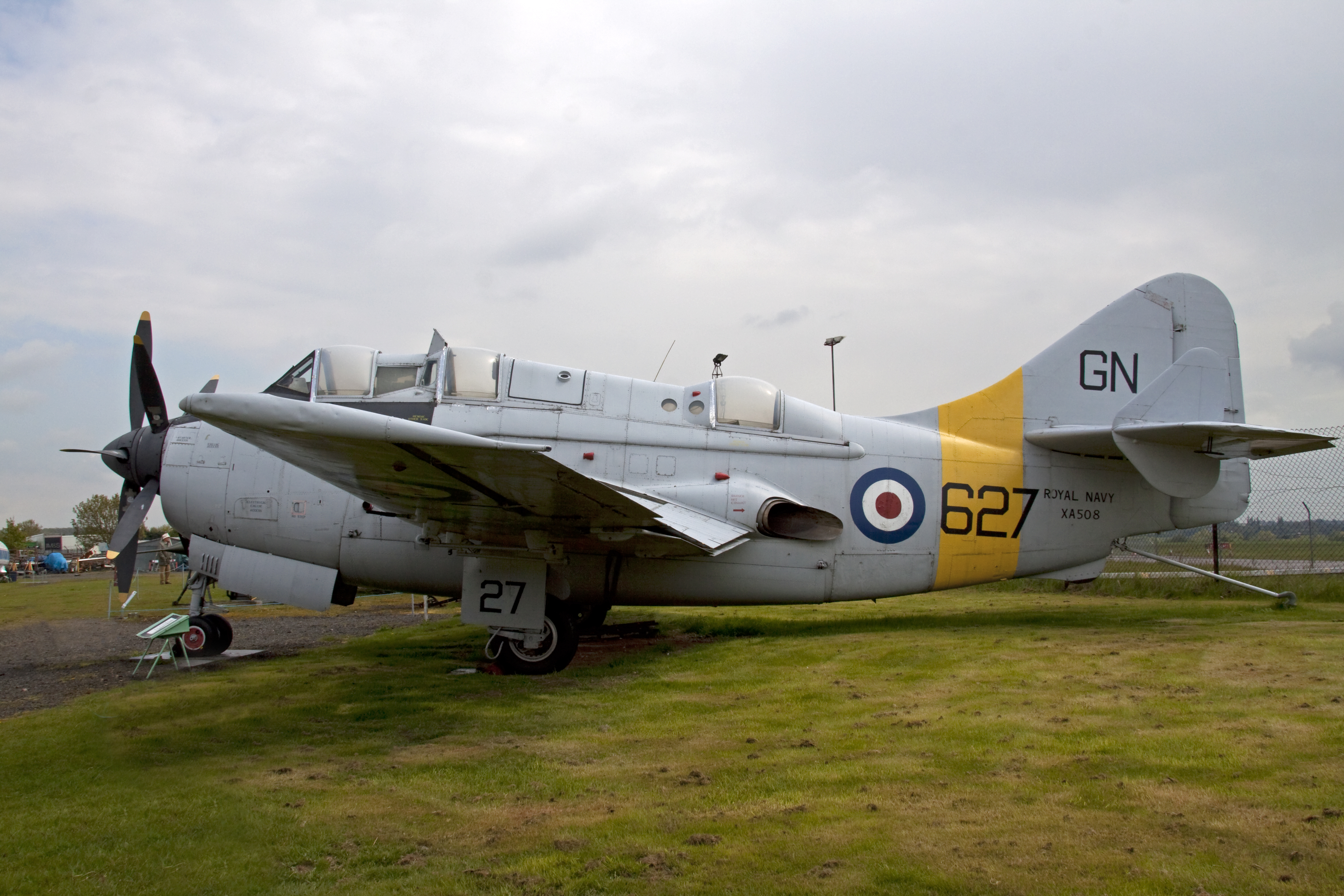
Gannet T.2; three cockpits, nose high stance, exhausts next to wing trailing edge, rounded off tailfin

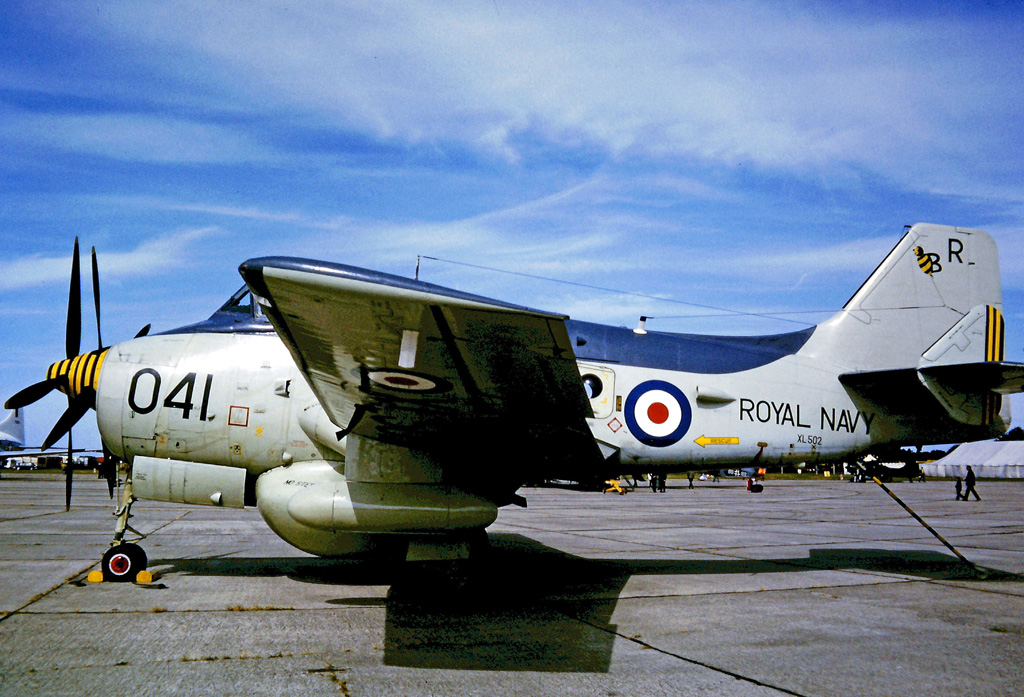
Gannet AEW.3; ventral radome, level stance, no engine exhaust at wing trailing edge, squared off tailfin

=== AEW Mk. 7 ===
Drawing of proposed Gannet AEW7

The AN/APS-20 radar was initially developed during the Second World War and had significant limitations to its capability, in terms of its performance at low level over water (such that it had difficulty differentiating between sea clutter and actual targets), and short-range. As a consequence, there were attempts to develop an updated AEW system for use on Royal Navy carriers. One of these, which came from the set of proposals from BAC, was an updated Gannet – in this, BAC proposed two separate schemes:

- A minimum change version of the existing AEW.3 with updated radar and systems.
- A stripped down and rebuilt version with all new systems, which became known as the AEW.7.

The AEW.7 version would have seen the ventral radome containing the AN/APS-20 radar removed and replaced with a dorsal rotating dome or 'rotodome', similar to that used on the US Grumman E-2 Hawkeye, carrying a newly developed FMICW radar system. To accommodate a new installation of the size of the rotodome, together with its position right at the rear of the aircraft, the intention was to rebuild the rear fuselage with the single tailfin being substituted by a twin tail arrangement, as well as the wingspan being increased to 60 ft (18.3m). The rotodome was designed to be moveable on its installation, able to tip backwards to allow the radar beam to operate clear of interference from the Gannet's propellers, negating the need to replace the Double Mamba with a turbofan engine assembly. In the end, this proposal was not proceeded with.

== Operational history ==
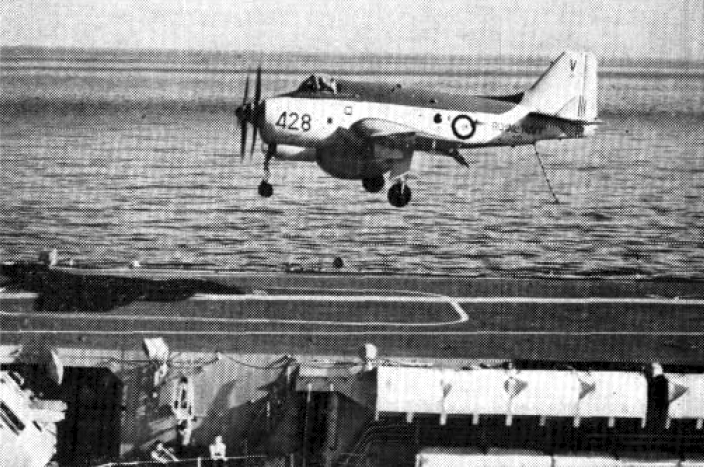
A Gannet of 849B Flight recovers aboard Victorious in 1961

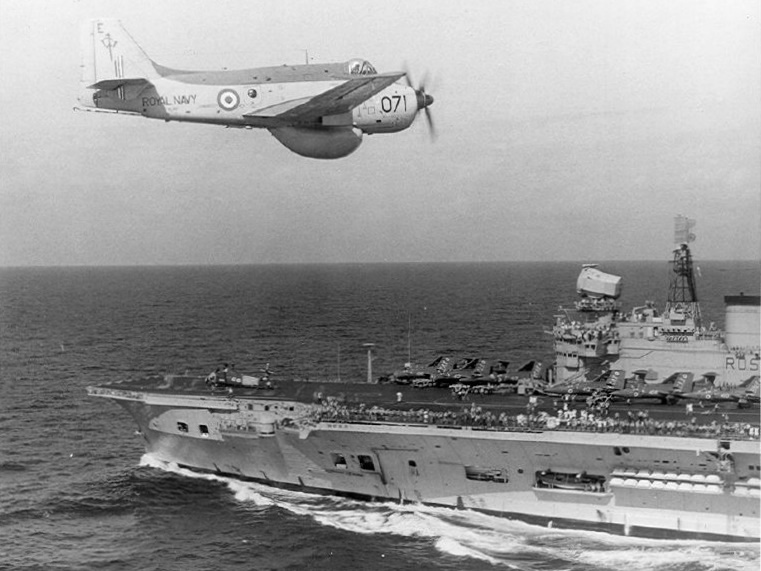
A Gannet of 849D Flight overflies Eagle in the early 1970s

The Royal Navy developed its airborne early warning tactics in the Skyraider, and then evolved them with the increased capabilities of the Gannet, which had observers trained to interpret the information coming in from the onboard radar. They could use it to control the combat air patrol to intercept incoming strike aircraft, or alternatively direct its own aircraft to strike and attack a target.

However, due to the quality of the equipment, the Gannet had limited command and control capability, built as it was around the AN/APS-20 S-Band search radar and AN/APX-7 IFF set, connected to the AN/ART-28 Bellhop datalink. The datalink would transmit the information received through the Gannet's onboard systems to the operations room on the aircraft carrier (or whichever ship was charged with directing the Gannet's operations), which would then act accordingly to any threat presented. However, the Gannet had no onboard computer or processing equipment (unlike the contemporary E-2B Hawkeye), which meant that the observers had to interpret the raw radar signal.

The Gannet had a three-person crew, consisting of the pilot, located in the cockpit at the front of the aircraft, and a pair of observers in the cabin in the fuselage, accessible via a hatch next to the trailing edge of the wing. The aircraft had a typical endurance of 5–6 hours and a maximum altitude of 25,000 ft (7,600 m). The Gannet tended to cruise on just one engine of the Double Mamba powerplant; alternating between the two engines every half an hour.

The sole operational Gannet squadron, 849 NAS had over the course of its time operating the aircraft a total of four operational flights plus the HQ flight. The HQ flight was stationed at three Fleet Air Arm air stations over the period of Gannet operation, while the majority of the operational flights were assigned to more than one aircraft carrier over the course of the Fleet Air Arm's use of the aircraft, with five RN carriers operating Gannet AEW flights.

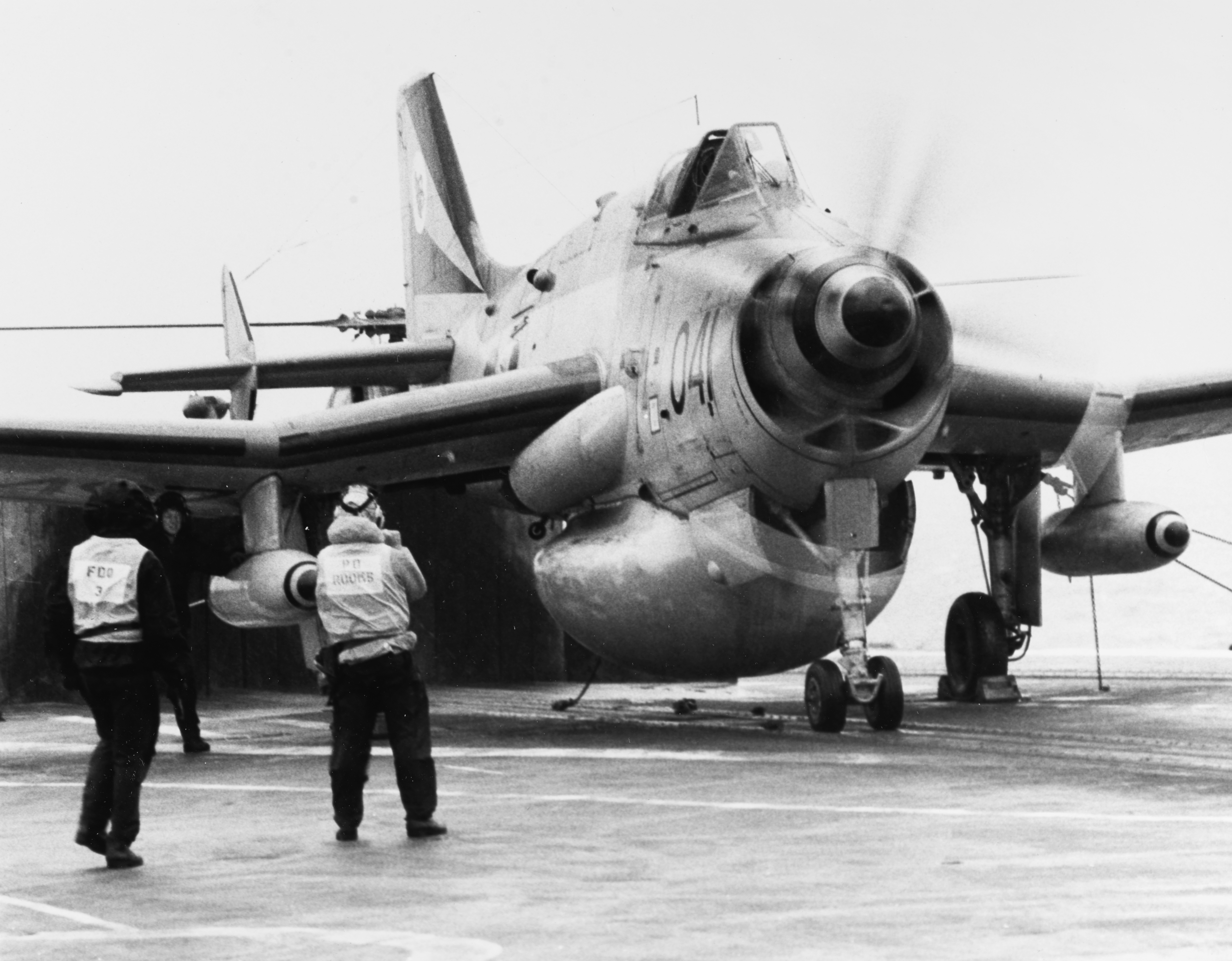
A Gannet on the catapult of HMS Ark Royal in September 1978

- HQ Flight – RNAS Culdrose (1960–1965); RNAS Brawdy (1965–1970); RNAS Lossiemouth (1970–1978)
- A Flight – HMS Ark Royal (1960); HMS Centaur (1961–1963); HMS Victorious (1963–1967); HMS Hermes (1968–1970)
- B Flight – HMS Victorious (1960–1962); HMS Hermes (1962–1967); HMS Ark Royal (1970–1978)
- C Flight – HMS Hermes (1960–1962); HMS Ark Royal (1962–1966)
- D Flight – HMS Eagle (1964–1971)

Each flight operated four AEW aircraft with a Gannet COD.4 for ship-to-shore communications. These flights were regularly deployed from the large aircraft carriers then in service with the Royal Navy. Additionally, it was intended that the Gannet would initially be deployed from the planned CVA-01 aircraft carrier, until the entry into service of a purpose-built AEW aircraft. However, in the mid-1960s the British government brought in a series of defence cuts that led to the new carriers and their AEW aircraft being cancelled, and the phased withdrawal of fixed wing aviation in the Royal Navy. 849C Flight was disbanded in 1966 following the reduction of the carrier fleet to four ships with the withdrawal of Centaur for conversion to a commando carrier (which did not take place) and the decommissioning of Ark Royal for her major, three-year reconstruction to accommodate the McDonnell Douglas Phantom. Subsequent carrier withdrawals led to the disbanding of 'A' Flight in 1970 (when Hermes was withdrawn for conversion to a commando carrier) and 'D' Flight in 1972 (when Eagle was decommissioned). The final operational Gannets were operated by 'B' Flight aboard Ark Royal following that ship's major refit and recommissioning in 1970. The Gannet continued in service until the final decommissioning of Ark Royal in 1978 – a Gannet of 849B Flight was the last aircraft to be recovered by the ship on Saturday 18 November 1978. The withdrawal of Ark Royal meant that there was no longer a platform available in the Royal Navy to operate the Gannet, and hence 849 Naval Air Squadron was disbanded in December 1978, leaving the Royal Navy without embedded airborne early warning.

=== Subsequent AEW in the Royal Navy ===
The phased withdrawal of the Gannet AEW, as part of the draw-down of fixed-wing aviation in the Fleet Air Arm, led to a need for the Royal Air Force to take over the provision of Airborne Early Warning for the UK Air Defence Region. As an interim solution until a purpose-built system could be procured, the radar and electronic systems from redundant Gannets were fitted to similarly redundant Avro Shackletons; the Shackleton was a maritime patrol aircraft then in the process of being replaced. However, this still meant that the Royal Navy, then in the process of introducing a new type of small aircraft carrier incapable of operating conventional fixed-wing aircraft, lacked an embedded AEW platform that could be used as part of the carrier task group. This lack of organic AEW capability following the withdrawal of the Gannet was seen as misguided, particularly following the experience of the Falklands War, in which the Royal Navy lost four ships due to the Task Force being reliant on shipborne air search. As a consequence, the Westland Sea King helicopter was modified to incorporate the Searchwater radar system for use in the AEW role from the Invincible class. The work to convert the first aircraft for this role, from the project being proposed, to a pair of aircraft being deployed as part of the air group aboard HMS Illustrious on her deployment to the Falklands, took 11 weeks.

The size of the Invincible class, combined with it being capable of operating only helicopters and V/STOL fixed-wing aircraft, limited the types of aircraft it could potentially carry in the AEW mission. Despite the Sea King's limitations in operating altitude and endurance, it remained the only feasible option from its introduction, in spite of efforts to design a platform more suitable – one such attempt came when BAe undertook a private study into the use of the proposed P.1216 advanced STOVL aircraft as an AEW platform, with a straight form wing and podded radar system. However, this proposal would have had a span of more than 60 ft, which was deemed the upper limit for operation aboard Ark Royal, and thus would have been difficult to accommodate on a ship the size of Invincible.

To coincide with the introduction of the new Queen Elizabeth class, a new AEW system was sought – initially a number of proposals were raised, as it was unclear what type of ship the new carrier would be. Once it was confirmed that Queen Elizabeth would be a STOVL type ship, it was clear that either a new helicopter based system, or a system based around a STOVL fixed-wing aircraft, such as the V-22 Osprey, would be required. It was eventually decided that a new, palletised system named "Crowsnest" would be operated from the Royal Navy's existing Merlin helicopters, to be operational by 2019.

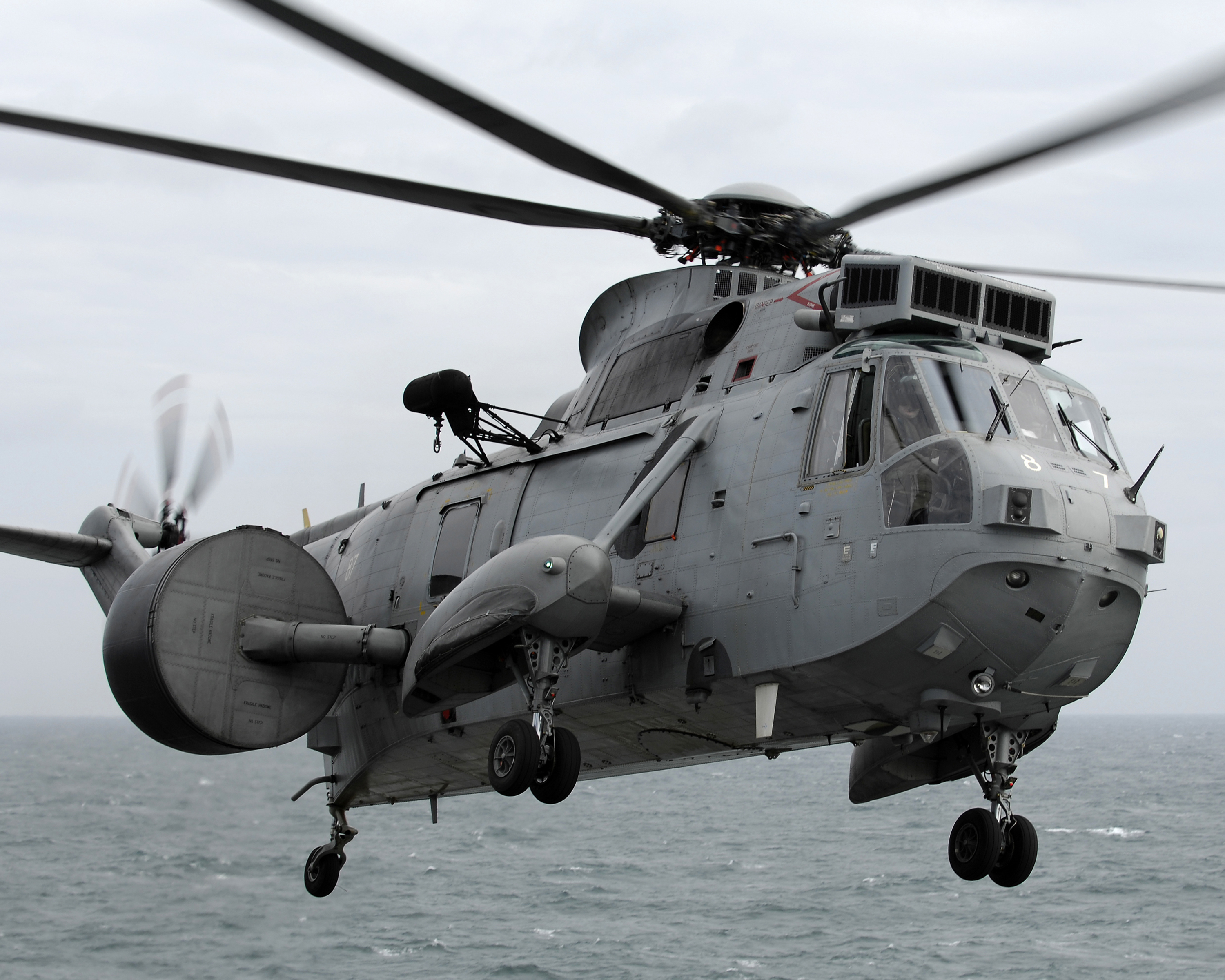
The Falklands War showed a need for AEW as part of the air group, leading to the Westland Sea King being modified to undertake the role

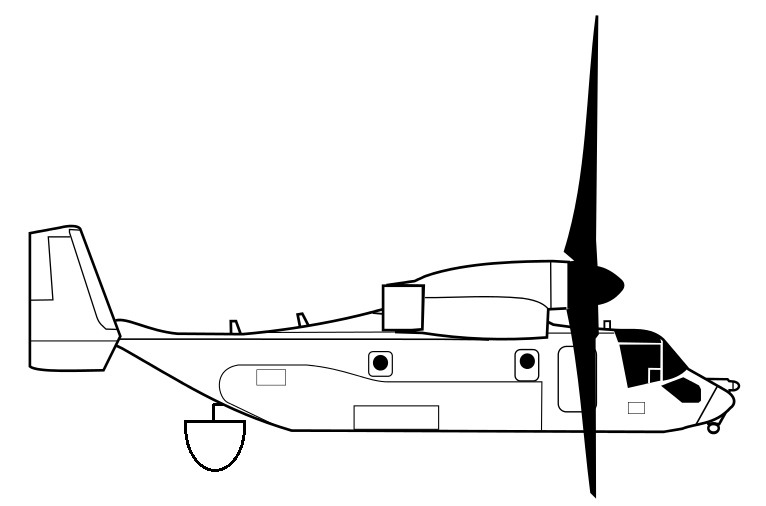
One of the proposals for an AEW platform in the Queen Elizabeth class was to use the V-22 Osprey tiltrotor aircraft, with a radome similar to that of the Sea King mounted on the tail ramp

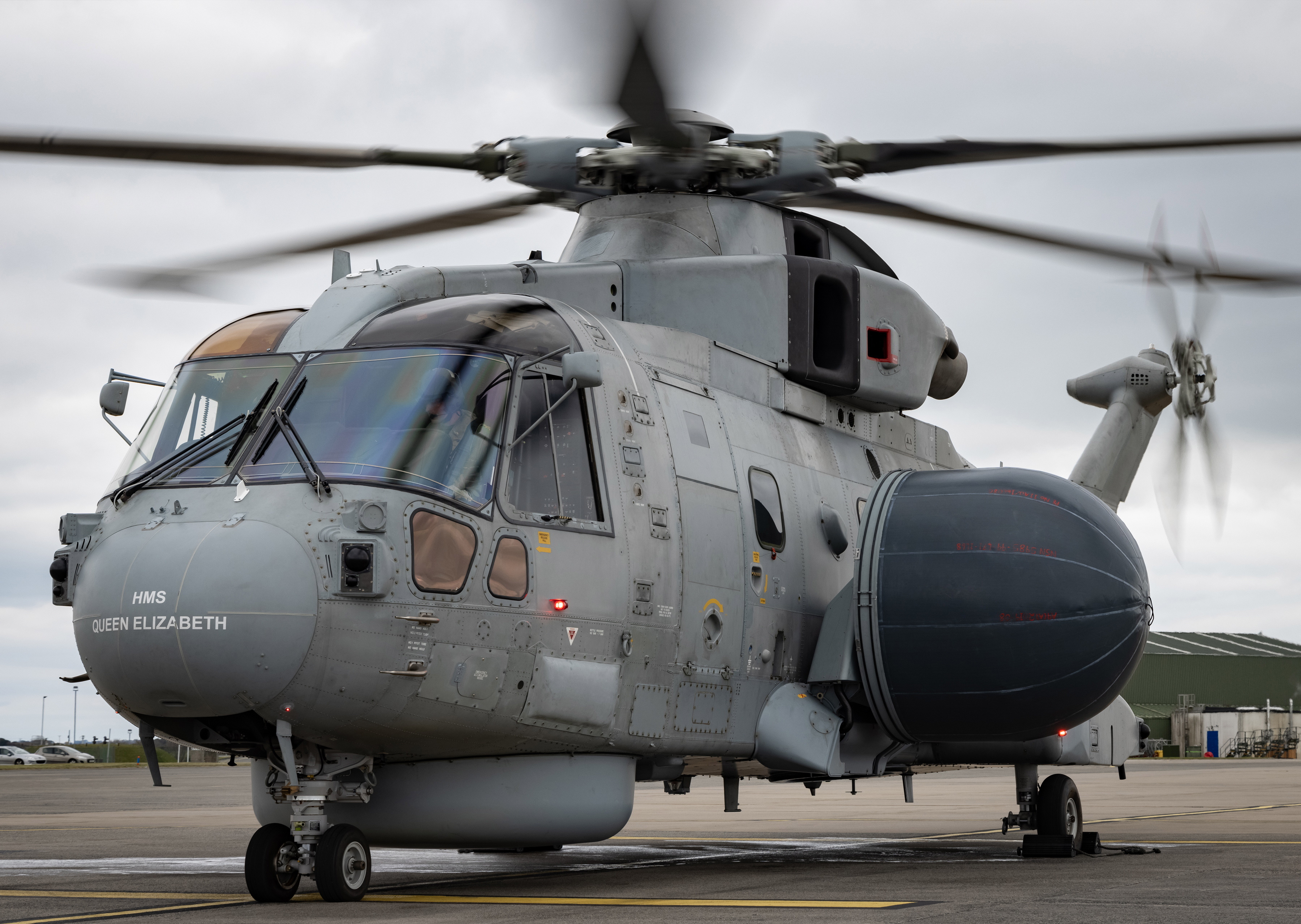
In 2021, the first AgustaWestland Merlins to be fitted for the AEW mission were deployed aboard a Royal Navy carrier

== Variants ==
Gannet AEW.3
Standard AEW version, developed from the anti-submarine version; entered service in 1960, 44 built
Gannet AEW.7
Proposed update with new dorsal rotodome similar to that used on the Grumman E-2 Hawkeye, radar and electronic systems and twin tail assembly; never produced

== Production ==
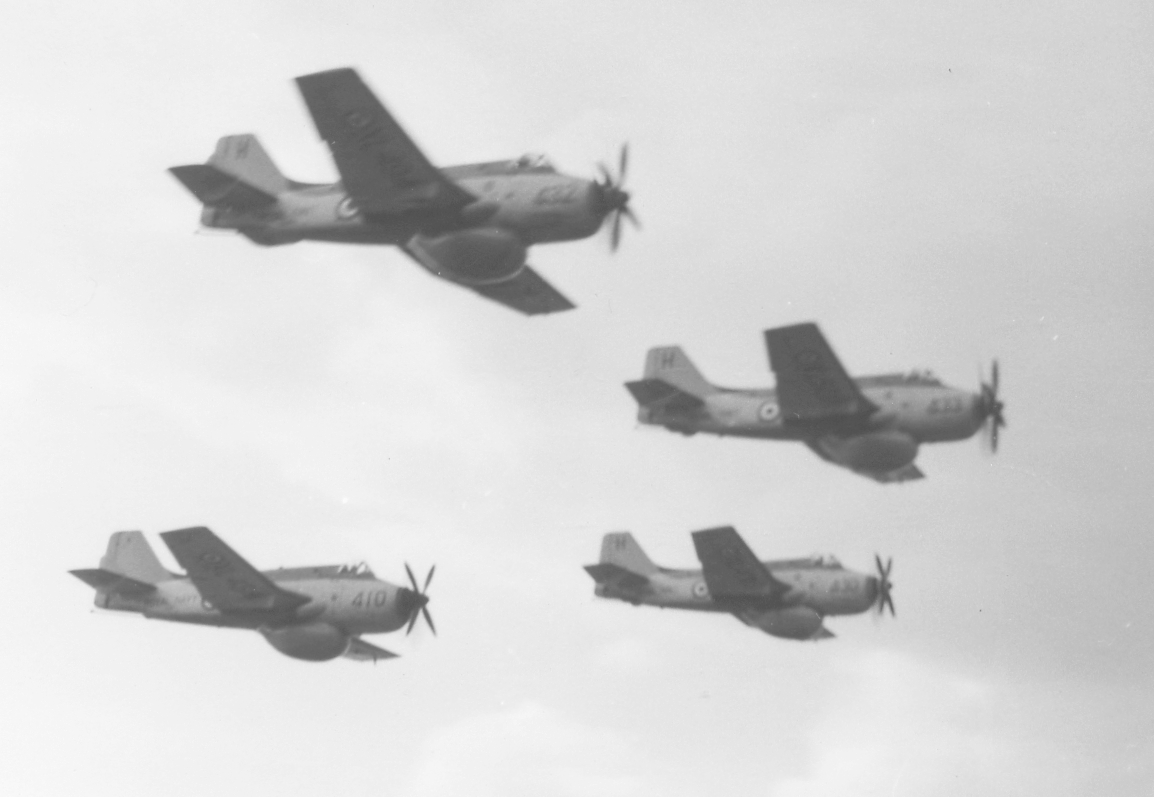
A section of four Gannets during the 1961 Farnborough Airshow.

All 44 Gannet AEW.3s were built at the Fairey factory at Hayes; the prototype and first two production aircraft were then transported by road to RAF Northolt for their first flight. The remainder of the aircraft first flew at White Waltham Airfield. One prototype (serial number XJ440) to be built at Hayes was ordered on 14 December 1954 against specification AEW.154D and first flown at RAF Northolt on 20 August 1958. The production aircraft were ordered as specification AEW.154P in three separate batches:

- 31 ordered 25 February 1956; first aircraft flown from RAF Northolt on 2 December 1958.
- 9 ordered 7 November 1959; first aircraft flown on 19 July 1961.
- 3 ordered 17 February 1961; first aircraft flown on 19 February 1963.

The final AEW.3 built was delivered to the Royal Navy on 6 June 1963.

== Operators ==
United Kingdom

- Fleet Air Arm
  - 700G Naval Air Squadron – intensive trials unit
  - 849 Naval Air Squadron – sole operational squadron; provided flights of 3–4 aircraft to carrier air groups

== Surviving aircraft ==
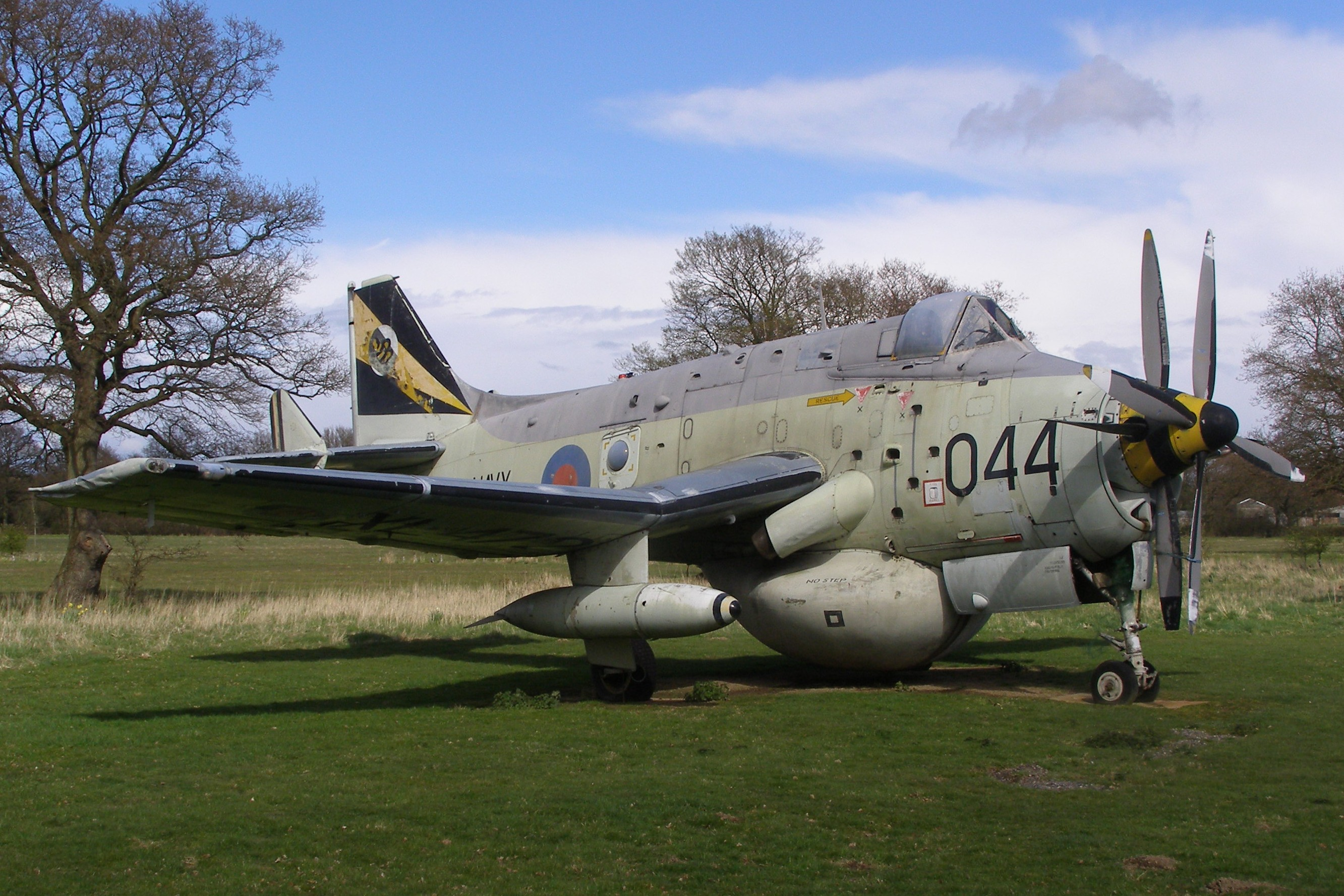
Gannet AEW.3 XL472 at Gatwick Aviation Museum

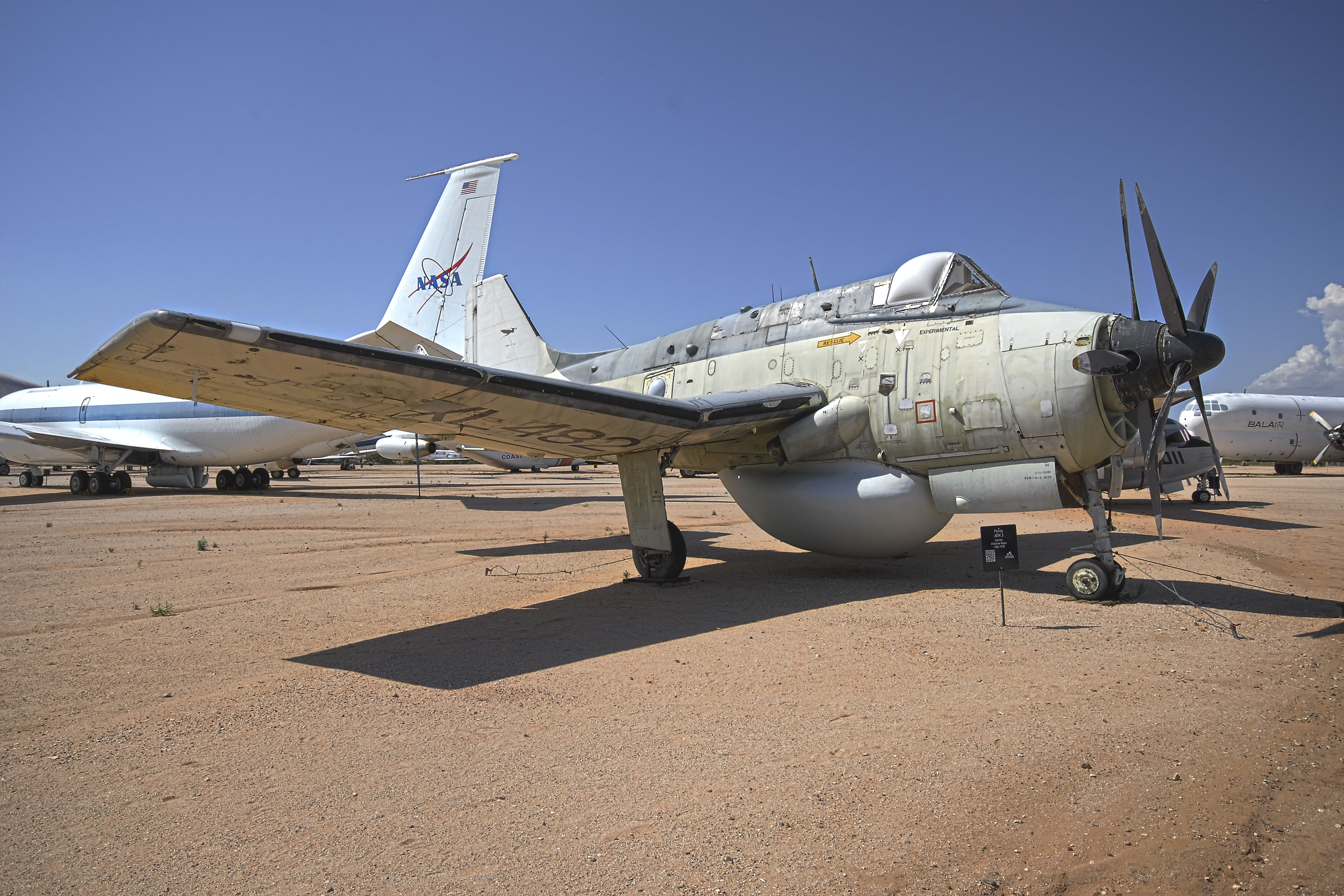
Gannet AEW.3 XL482 is displayed at the Pima Air & Space Museum, Arizona

The majority of Royal Navy Gannets were scrapped following withdrawal. The drawdown of the Gannet force in the late 1960s and early 1970s however led to a significant amount of electronic equipment being removed from the Gannet airframes for installation in Avro Shackleton aircraft of the Royal Air Force, which allowed the RAF to undertake its own AEW operations. In addition, a handful continued flying operations in the hands of civilian operators into the 1980s – one was used by Hamilton Standard in the United States for propeller vibration trials, while another was used by Dowty Rotol for propeller development purposes. In addition, a further AEW3 was used as a private display aircraft at airshows until the late 1980s. As of 2012, one aircraft (XL500 civil registered as G-KAEW), which was once flown by Charles III, was undergoing comprehensive restoration to airworthy condition by Hunter Flying.

Germany

- Gannet AEW.3 XL450, is displayed at the Flugausstellung Hermeskeil in Germany

United Kingdom

Five aircraft are on display:

- Gannet AEW.3 XL472 at the Gatwick Aviation Museum, Surrey, England
- Gannet AEW.3 XL497 at the Dumfries and Galloway Aviation Museum, Scotland
- Gannet AEW.3 XL502 at Yorkshire Air Museum, England
- Gannet AEW.3 XL503 at the Fleet Air Arm Museum, Yeovilton
- Gannet AEW.3 XP226 at the Newark Air Museum, England

United States

- Gannet AEW.3 XL482 is displayed at the Pima Air & Space Museum, Arizona

== Specifications ==
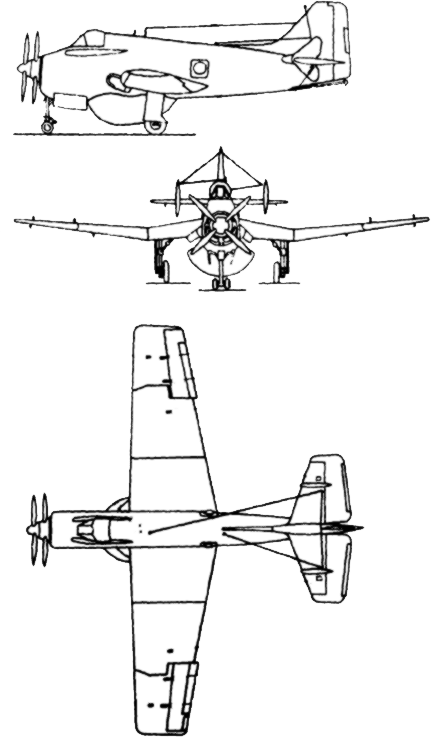
Fairey Gannet AEW.3 drawing

Data from British Naval Aircraft since 1912

General characteristics

- Crew: 3
- Length: 44 ft (13 m)
- Wingspan: 54 ft 4 in (16.56 m)
- Height: 16 ft 10 in (5.13 m)
- Wing area: 490 sq ft (46 m^{2})
- Airfoil: root: NACA 23018; tip: NACA 23010
- Gross weight: 25,000 lb (11,340 kg)
- Powerplant: 1 × Armstrong Siddeley ASMD.4 Double Mamba coupled turboprop engine, 3,875 shp (2,890 kW)
- Propellers: 8-bladed contra-rotating propeller

Performance

- Maximum speed: 250 mph (400 km/h, 220 kn)
- Range: 700 mi (1,100 km, 610 nmi)
- Endurance: 5–6 hours
- Service ceiling: 25,000 ft (7,600 m)

Avionics

- AN/APS-20 S Band air search radar
- AN/APX-7 IFF interrogator-responder
- AN/ART-28 Bellhop datalink

== See also ==
Related development

- Fairey Gannet

Aircraft of comparable role, configuration, and era

- Douglas AD-4W Skyraider
- Grumman E-1 Tracer
- Hawker Siddeley P.139B

Related lists

- List of aircraft of the Fleet Air Arm
