= AN/APS-20 =

Airborne search radar

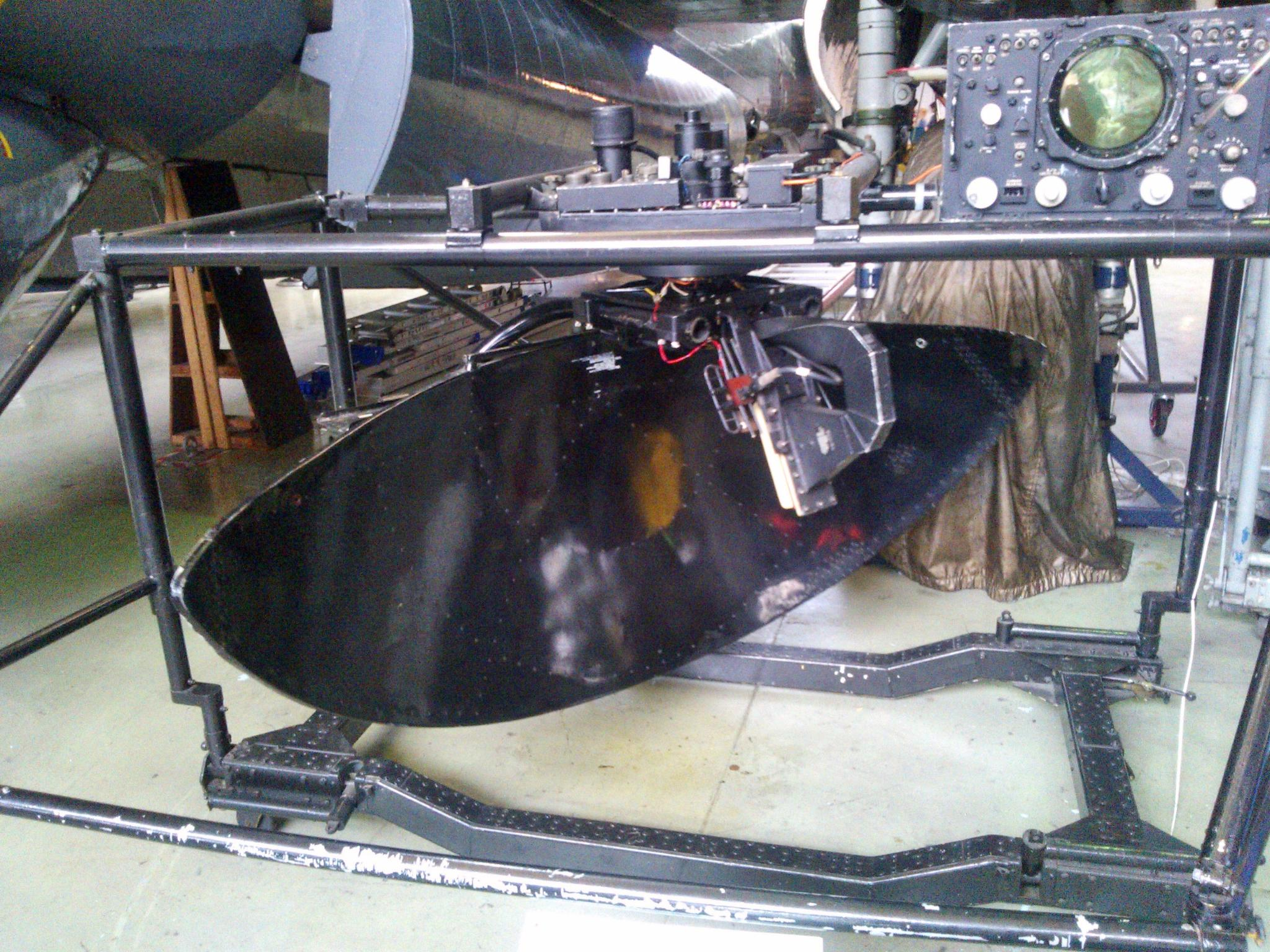
- AN/APS-20 at the Museum of Science and Industry in Manchester
- Country of origin: United States
- Manufacturer: General Electric; Hazeltine
- Designer: MIT Radiation Laboratory
- Introduced: 1945
- Type: Airborne early warning, maritime patrol, weather research
- Frequency: S Band (APS/AN-20A), plus L and X Band (AN/APS-20E)
- PRF: 300 Hz
- Beamwidth: 1.5° (horizontal), 6° (vertical)
- Pulsewidth: 2 μs
- RPM: 3 or 6
- Range: 200 nmi (370 km; 230 mi) against surface ships, 65 nmi (120 km; 75 mi) (APS/AN-20B)
- Diameter: 8 ft (2.4 m) (APS/AN-20A)
- Power: 1 MW (APS/AN-20A)

The AN/APS-20 was an airborne early warning, anti-submarine, maritime surveillance and weather radar developed in the United States in the 1940s. Entering service in 1945, it served for nearly half a century, finally being retired in 1991. Initially developed at MIT's Radiation Laboratory under Project Cadillac, the radar was developed to be carried by aircraft to extend the sensor range of ships by placing a radar at altitude. Although developed for carrier-borne operation, first being installed in the single-engine General Motors TBM-3W Avenger, it was also used in larger four-engine airframes, the last being a fleet of Avro Shackleton AEW.2 which were converted from maritime patrol aircraft.

The radar was used by the United States military and a large number of services in other countries. These included the French Navy, Japan Maritime Self-Defense Force (JMSDF), Royal Air Force (RAF) and Royal Canadian Air Force (RCAF). Although developed for detecting aircraft, it saw extensive service in anti-submarine and maritime patrol roles and was one of the first radars to be used in researching extreme weather like hurricanes by agencies like the Environmental Science Services Administration (ESSA). Early versions of the radar could see a low-flying aircraft at 65 nautical miles (120 km; 75 mi) and a ship at 200 nautical miles (370 km; 230 mi). This was improved, so that later versions had a range against aerial targets of 115 nautical miles (213 km; 132 mi).

== Background ==
From the early days of its development, radar had been used to detect aircraft. Early apparatus were large and required substantial power, and so could only be emplaced in fixed locations and ships. However, during World War II, increasingly smaller radar sets were developed that could be installed in smaller platforms like aircraft. At the same time, the United States Navy (USN) was aware that attacks from the aircraft of the Imperial Japanese Navy were the largest threat to their warships and protecting these ships became more dependent on aircraft carriers and their squadrons. There was especially a need to combat the increasing danger from Japanese Kamikaze attacks. Shipborne radar did not have sufficient range to identify attacking bombers in time to launch defensive interceptor aircraft due to the radar horizon. The solution lay in placing a radar in an aircraft. Night fighter radars proved inadequate for the task. Optimised for aerial combat, they were too short ranged to fulfil the necessary long-range aerial surveillance role.

== Design and development ==
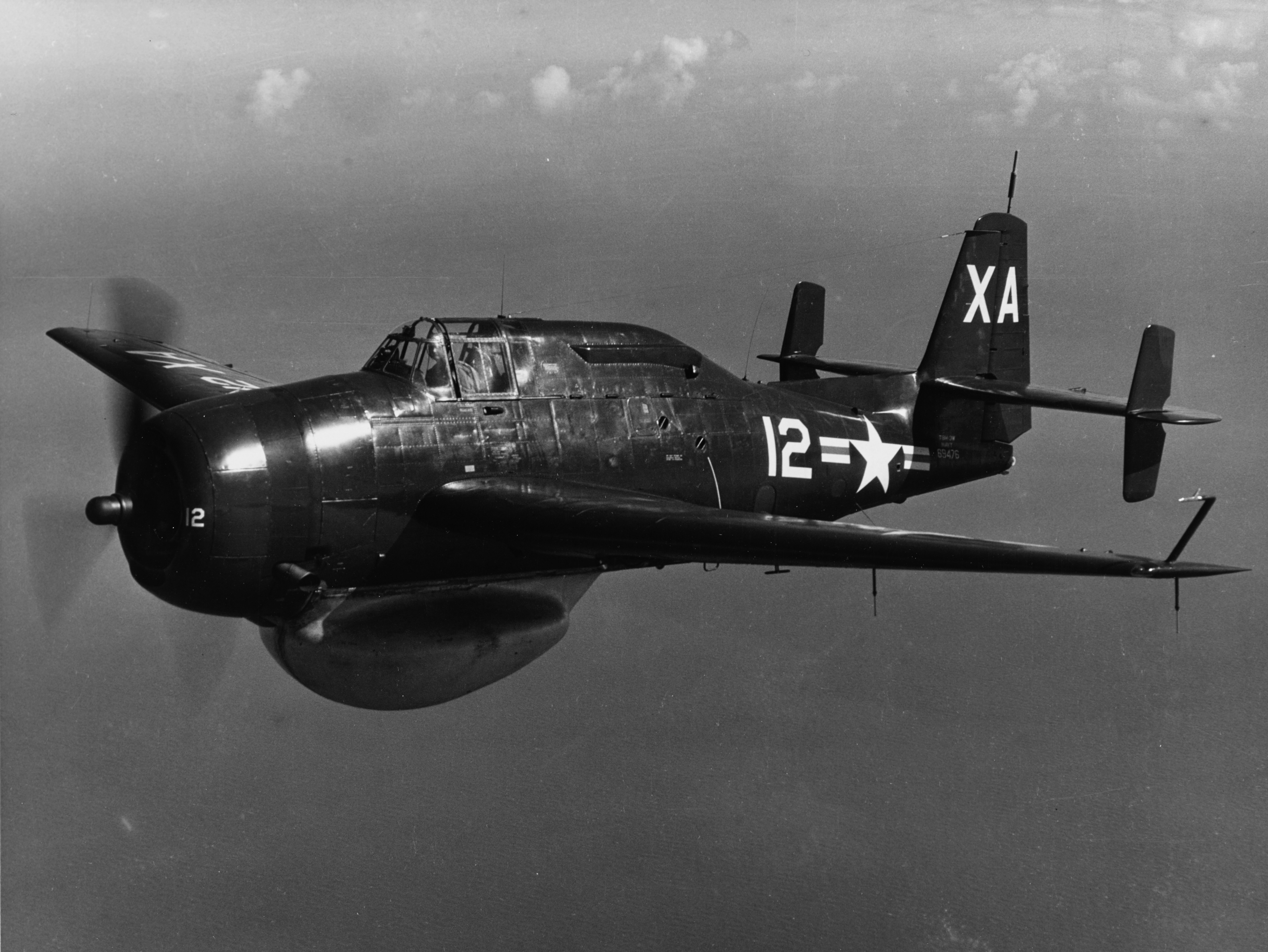
General Motors TBM-3W

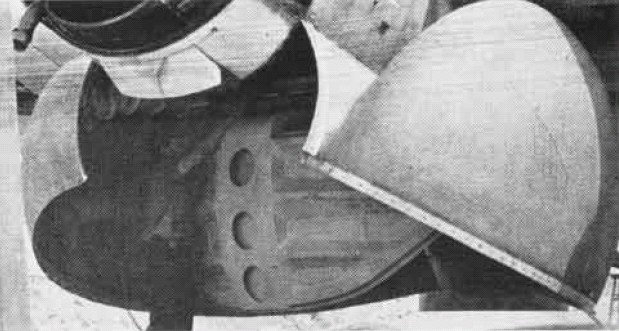
The radar in a TBM-3W

The solution to the problem of detecting objects beyond the horizon lay in developing a dedicated airborne early warning radar. On 2 February 1942, the USN commissioned the Radiation Laboratory at the Massachusetts Institute of Technology (MIT) to explore an airborne radar design dedicated to seeking aircraft under Project Cadillac, named after the Cadillac Mountain in Maine. The team grew rapidly from 37, including 10 officers, in May 1943 to 138 at the end of the War. The outcome of the development was an S-Band radar designated AN/APS-20. Development continued in two guises. Cadillac I, the initial platform, was to be carrier-based and the first radar was to be fitted to converted General Motors TBM-3 Avenger torpedo bombers. Simultaneously, the need for a version for larger land-based aircraft was recognised. Under the guise of Cadillac II, it was decided that the Boeing B-17G Flying Fortress heavy bomber was to be fitted with the radar.

The production radar was manufactured by General Electric and Hazeltine. The first version, the AN/APS-20A, had, initially, an 8-foot-4-inch (2.54 m) antenna and operated on a frequency of 2850 MHz in the S band. The radar featured large sidelobes. Later a slightly smaller 8 ft (2.4 m) antenna was used. The scanner had two speeds, 3 and 6 revolutions per minute. The radar worked at a Pulse Repetition Frequency (PRF) of 300 Hz, a pulse length of 2 μs. Peak power was 1 MW. The radar provided bearing but did not provide altitude, which meant its radar fix was two-dimensional. The AN/APS-20B, designed to be carried by larger aircraft, differed in size and capability. It had a peak power of 2 MW and a horizontal beam width of 1.5° and vertical of 6°. Pulse width remained 2 μs. Range was extended to 65 nautical miles (120 km; 75 mi) against low flying aircraft and 200 nautical miles (370 km; 230 mi) against shipping.

Later versions expanded the capability. The AN/APS-20F extended the range against aircraft to 80 nautical miles (150 km; 92 mi), while the larger AN/APS-20E could detect an aerial 1 m^{2} (11 sq ft) target at 115 nautical miles (213 km; 132 mi). Initially deployed in 1953, the E model operated in the L band, S band and X band, with a wide selection of PRFs and pulse widths in each band. It also included automatic target indication, three choices of heading reference and stabilization, selectable azimuth and elevation beam widths, selectable output and receiver radiated gain and automatic gain control amongst other features.

In accordance with the Joint Electronics Type Designation System (JETDS), the "AN/APS-20" designation represents the 20th design of an Army-Navy airborne electronic device for search radar equipment. The JETDS system also now is used to name all Department of Defense electronic systems.

== Service ==
=== Trials and initial use ===
The first aircraft equipped with the AN/APS-20 was a converted TBM-3 Avenger, designated XTBM-3W, which first flew on 5 August 1944. The radar was mounted in a radome under the forward fuselage. A series of aircraft were converted from existing TBM-3 airframes by the Naval Aircraft Modification Unit and designated TBM-3W, with initial training aboard the aircraft carrier Ranger starting in May 1945. The crew of the Avenger consisted of a single Radar Operator (RO) and the pilot. The radar picture was transmitted back to the aircraft carrier for processing. At the same time, 31 large Boeing PB-1W aircraft were converted from B-17G Flying Fortresses to become the first land-based aircraft equipped with the radar. The larger size of the PB-1W allowed for two ROs, an Electronics Technician and, critically, a Combat Information Center (CIC) Officer supported by two radio operators. The latter team was able to direct aircraft to the target, adding the ability of the aircraft to control fighter aircraft and enabling operation independent of shipboard or ground-based control. This capability was later developed into the Airborne Warning and Control System (AWACS). The war ended before either aircraft became operational.

Post-war, the USN quickly accelerated a program to get the radar into service. Between 24 February and 23 March 1953, PB-1W were used as an airborne command information centre, operating in a zone between 30 and 40 miles (48 and 64 km) from a naval task force. However, newer airframes were quickly introduced. AN/APS-20 radars were installed in the Douglas AD-3W Skyraider, which replaced the Avenger, and the Lockheed PO-2W Warning Star, later designated the EC-121 in 1962, a specialized platform developed from the Lockheed L-1049 Super Constellation airliner. Both also saw service outside the USN. The latter, which could carry up to 30 servicemen for long trips, so impressed the newly formed United States Air Force (USAF) that it ordered it into service as the RC-121 Warning Star. The radar was used to detect aircraft as they approached over water, although it struggled to identify low flying aircraft against a background of trees, topographical features or moving land vehicles. At the same time, the Royal Navy procured fifty examples of the AD-3W as the Skyraider AEW.1. This was the first use of the radar by a non-US operator. Meanwhile, in an attempt to extend endurance, in 1954 the USN ordered the installation of the radar in a blimp, the ZP2N-1W, later redesignated ZPG-2W and then, in 1962, EZ-1B. The last example retired in October 1962, not only ending the use of the radar in airships but also all lighter than air operations by the service.

=== Expanding capabilities ===
Alongside these developments, new uses of the radar were explored. One arena where the radar broke new ground was in weather research, particularly with the hurricane hunters that flew into tropical cyclones. The first trials of the radar took place in 1946 with a PB-1W and on 15 September 1953 the newly created weather squadron VJ2 flew the first aircraft equipped with an AN/APS-20 into a hurricane, Hurricane Dolly. Equipped with the dedicated Lockheed WV-3 Warning Star from 1956, the squadron frequently flew up to three times a week on tropical cyclone observation. At the same time, VW-1 was providing a similar service tracking typhoons in the Pacific. Other users of the radar included the Environmental Science Services Administration (ESSA) and its successor the National Oceanic and Atmospheric Administration (NOAA). Aircraft operated by these agencies were also made available to universities, and therefore the radar was also used as a tool for academic research where its attributes proved invaluable in the study of precipitation. It was used in a wide range of airframes, including converted Douglas DC-6 airliners and the dedicated Lockheed WP-3A Orion which served into the 1970s.

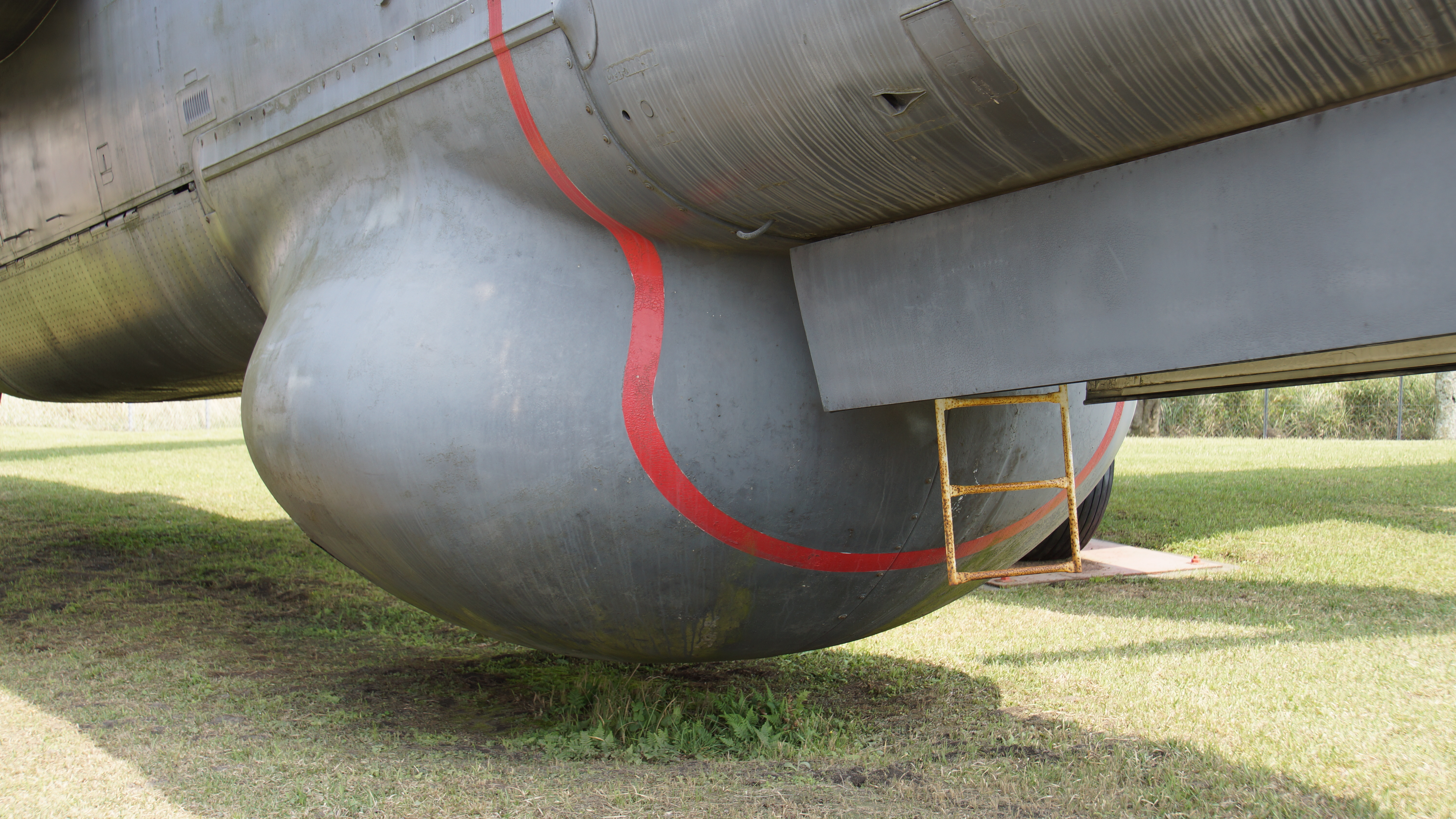
AN/APS-20E radome on a Japanese P2V-7

Meanwhile, in 1948, the UK evaluated a PB-1W equipped with AN/APS-20 against a Vickers Warwick V fitted with ASV.13 to see if the radar could also be used to identify surface ships, but the peak power was deemed too high and the pulse length too long for the application. Nonetheless, the Royal Canadian Air Force (RCAF) used the radar in their maritime surveillance Canadair Argus Mk.1. Of greater impact, however, was the subsequent use of the improved AN/APS-20E in the role aboard the Lockheed P2V Neptune. The radar first flew in the third airframe, designated P2V-2S, which was the first one developed for the anti-submarine role. Despite it being ineffectual when tracking periscopes, it proved effective at identifying large surface ships up to 200 nautical miles (370 km; 230 mi) away. Subsequently, the airframe was adopted by a range of operators in nine different countries, from the Argentine Navy to the Republic of China Air Force. The AN/APS-20E was also fitted to US Marine Sikorsky HR2S transport helicopters. Tests proved that fitting the radar to the airframe did not jeopardise flight characteristics but the radar components were damaged by the helicopter's high level of vibration.

The AN/APS-20 was also briefly used as part of the Space Race, supporting Project Mercury, where the radar's long range enabled it to be used in tracking and other tasks. It was particularly used to help find returning space capsules after splashdown. For example, the radar was installed aboard aircraft of VP-5 that were involved in the recovery of Commander Alan Shepard from Mercury-Redstone 3, Captain Gus Grissom from Mercury-Redstone 4 and Commander Wally Schirra from Mercury-Atlas 8.

Replacement of the radar took many decades. The USAF trialled the more advanced AN/APS-82, which provided target height data, in 1956 but waited until after 1962 before replacing the radar with the AN/APS-95 aboard their Warning Stars. In the meantime, the USN introduced the AN/APS-82 on board carriers in the airborne early warning role in 1959 as the design of the Grumman WF-1 equipped with the AN/APS-20 was superseded at the production stage by the Grumman WF-2 Tracer. The AN/APS-80, which offered similar capabilities to the AN/APS-20 but added continuous 360° area search coverage, replaced the radar in the anti-submarine role from 1961. The Canadians finally replaced their AN/APS-20 with AN/APS-115 in 1981. The last operator of the radar was the Royal Air Force (RAF), which had previously used it between 1952 and 1957. When the Royal Navy retired their last AN/APS-20, they were refurbished and fitted to retiring Avro Shackleton MR.2 maritime patrol aircraft. Re-entering service in 1972 with the RAF with the designation AEW.2, the aircraft continued to operate until July 1991 in the airborne early warning role.

== Variants ==
AN/APS-20A
Initial version developed for carrier-based aircraft with single 12 in (305 mm) CRT display.
AN/APS-20B
Initial version developed for land-based aircraft with additional command and control capability.
AN/APS-20C
Improved version to equip both large four-engine and carrier-borne single-engine aircraft.
AN/APS-20E
Larger antenna version optimised for maritime patrol.
AN/APS-20F
Version with smaller antenna and less range than the AN/APS-20E.

== Applications ==
=== Aircraft ===
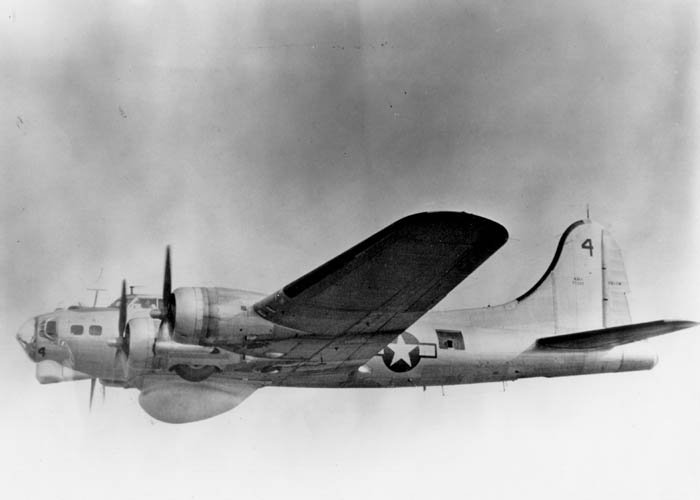
Boeing PB-1W

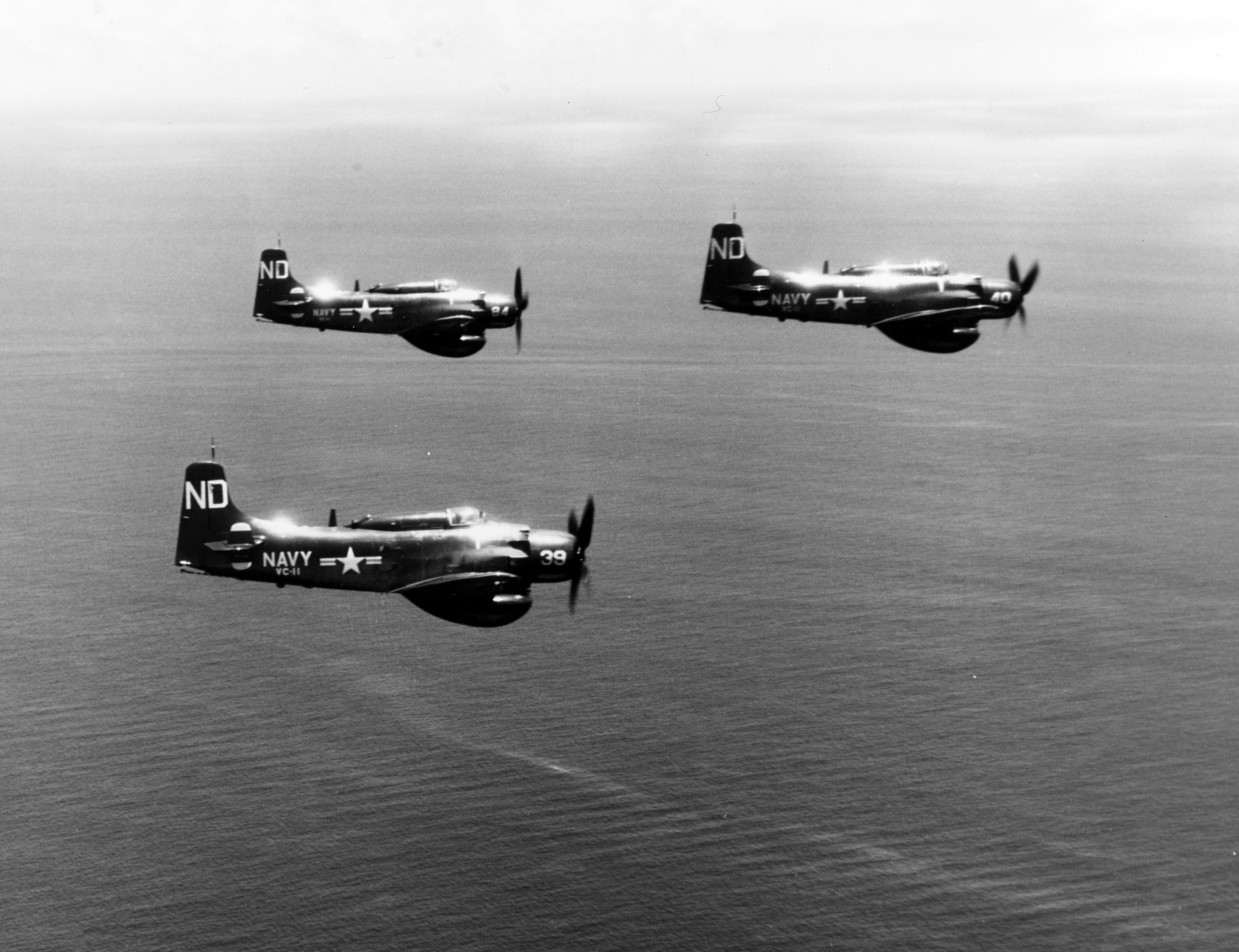
Douglas AD-3W Skyraiders

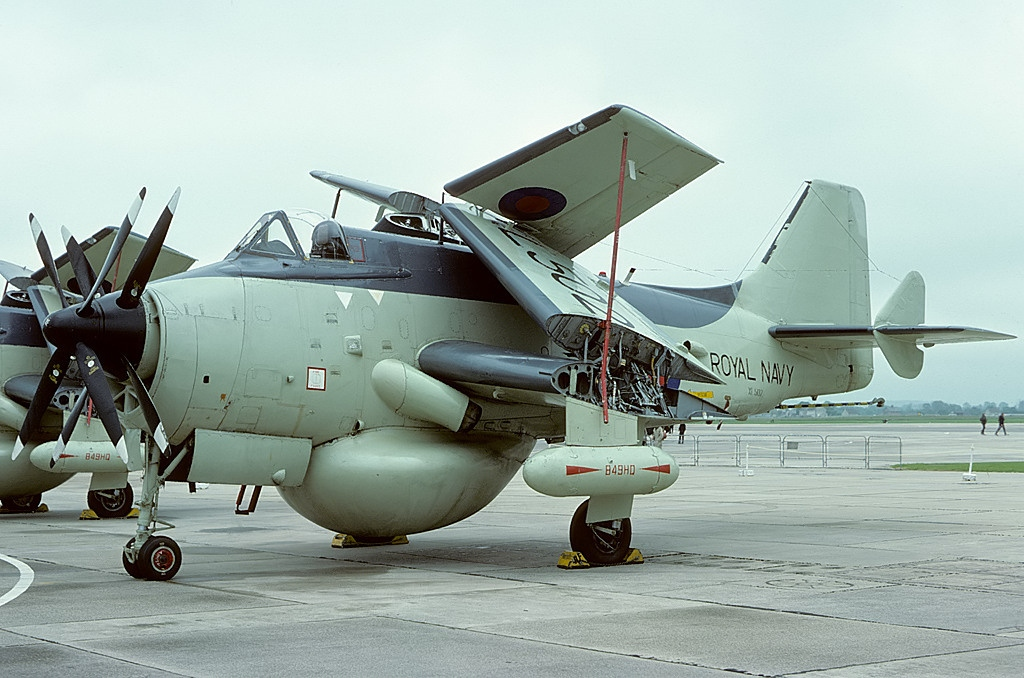
Fairey Gannet AEW.3

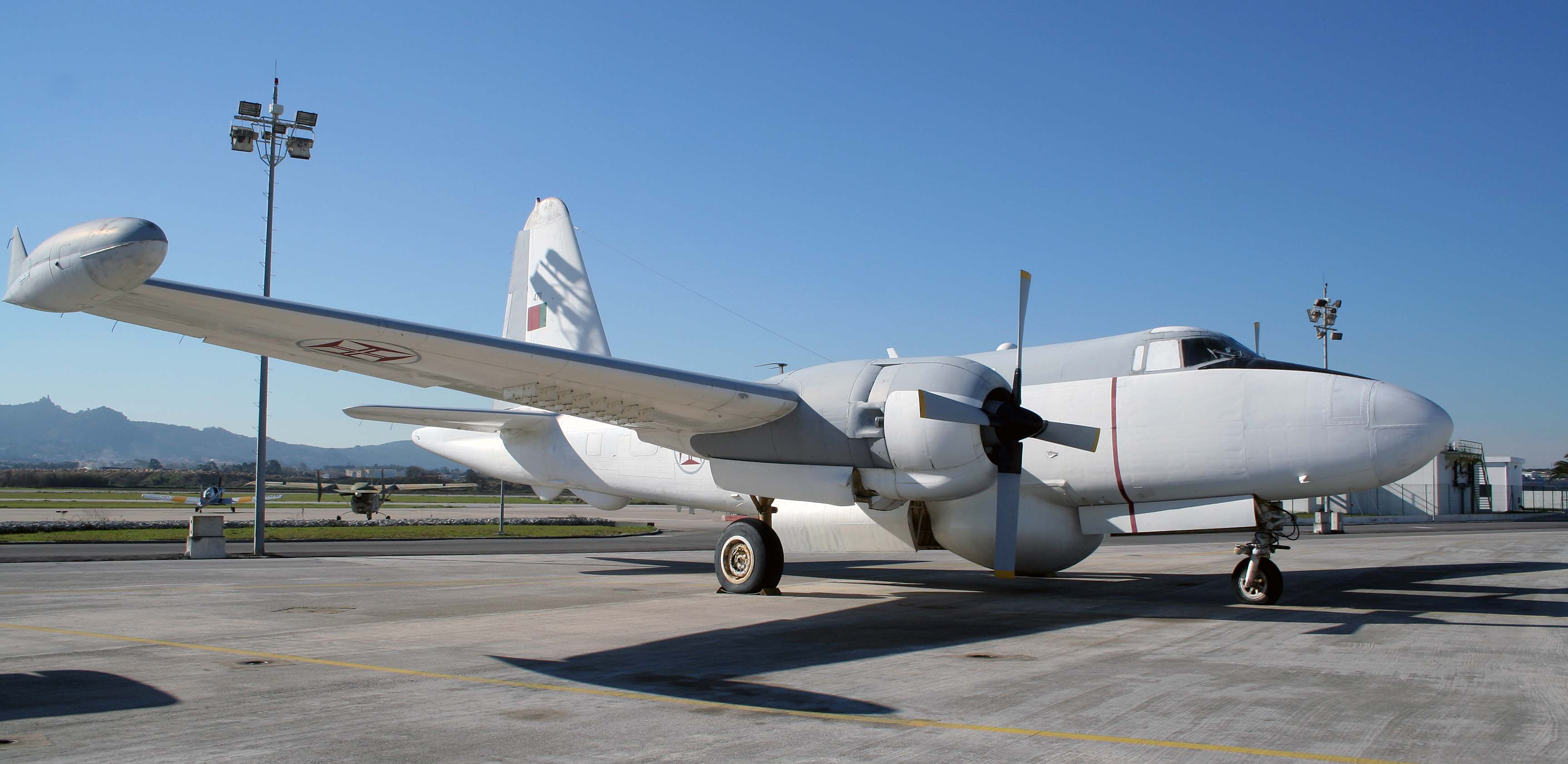
Lockheed P2V-5 Neptune

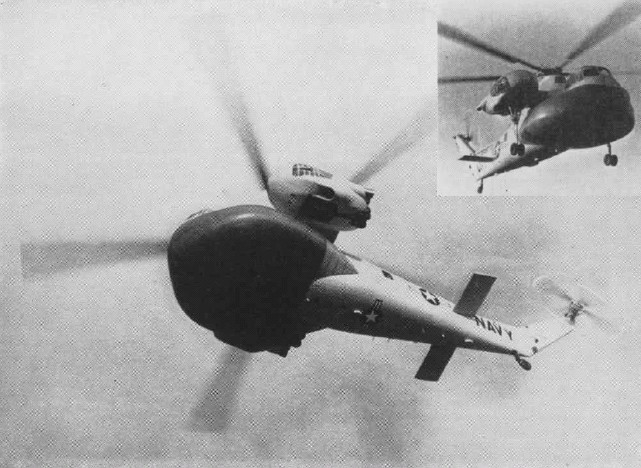
Sikorsky HR2S-1W

- Avro Shackleton AEW.2 – 12 converted.
- Boeing B-29 Superfortress – 3 converted.
- Boeing PB-1W – 32 converted.
- Canadair Argus Mk.1 – 13 built.
- Douglas AD-W / EA-1 Skyraider – 367 built, including one XAD-1W prototype.
- Douglas Skyraider AEW.1 – 50 built.
- Douglas DC-6 – 2 converted.
- Fairey Gannet AEW.3 – 44 built.
- Goodyear ZPG-2W – 5 built.
- General Motors TBM-3W Avenger – 27 converted.
- Grumman Avenger Mk.3W2 – 8 delivered.
- Grumman TB3F-1S / AF-2W Guardian – 156 built, including one XTB3F-1S prototype.
- Lockheed PO-2W / WV-2 / RC-121 / EC-121 Warning Star. 232 built.
- Lockheed WV-3 / WC-121 Warning Star. 8 converted.
- Lockheed P2V-2S Neptune – 1 built.
- Lockheed P2V-3W Neptune – 30 built.
- Lockheed P2V-4 / P-2D Neptune – 51 built, including P2V-2S prototype.
- Lockheed P2V-5 / P-2E Neptune – 424 built, including 52 Neptune MR.1.
- Lockheed P2V-7 / P-2H Neptune – 287 built, including 48 assembled by Kawasaki.
- Lockheed EP-3E Orion – 2 converted.
- Lockheed WP-3A Orion – 4 converted.
- Sikorsky HR2S-1W – 2 built.

=== Former operators ===
Argentina

- Argentine Navy.

Australia

- Royal Australian Air Force.

Brazil

- Brazilian Air Force.

Canada

- Royal Canadian Air Force.
- Royal Canadian Navy.

France

- French Navy.

Japan

- Japan Maritime Self Defense Force.

Netherlands

- Dutch Naval Aviation Service.

Portugal

- Portuguese Air Force.

Republic of China

- Republic of China Air Force.

United Kingdom

- Royal Air Force.
- Royal Navy.

United States

- Environmental Science Services Administration.
- National Oceanic and Atmospheric Administration.
- United States Air Force.
- United States Navy.
- United States Weather Bureau.

== See also ==
- Radar picket § Replacement by aircraft
- Radar picket § Converted and purpose-built submarines - Project Migraine
- List of military electronics of the United States
- List of radars
