= 1995 Royal Air Force Nimrod MR2 crash =

Aircraft accident

Coordinates: 43.6147°N 79.4065°W

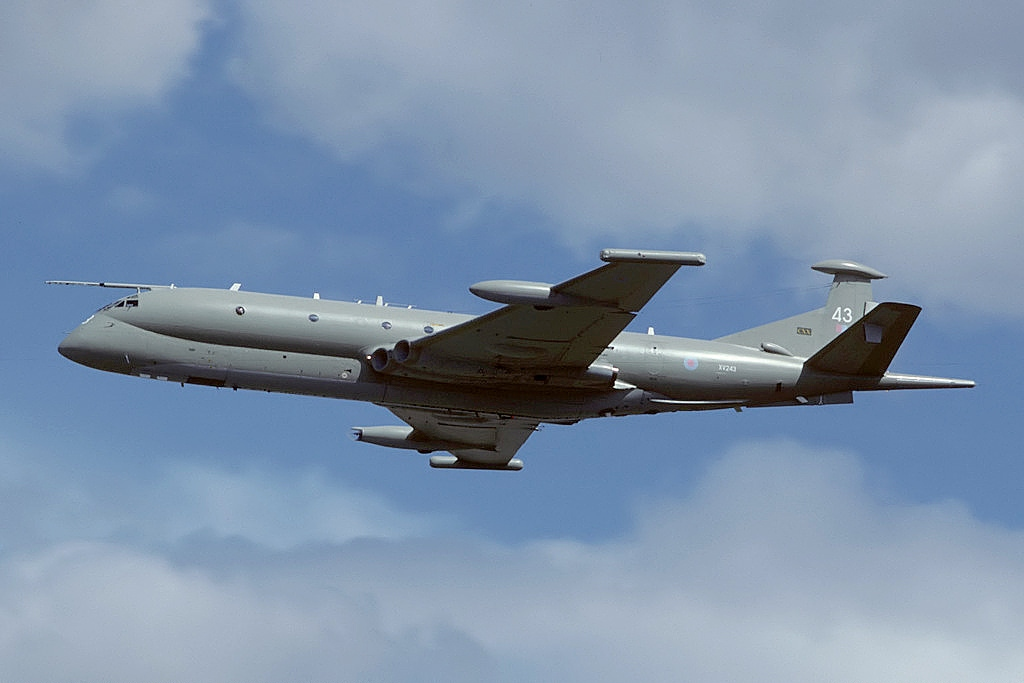
- Nimrod MR.2, identical to the aircraft lost

Accident
- Date: 2 September 1995
- Summary: Pilot error
- Site: Lake Ontario, 0.8 km from Toronto

Aircraft
- Aircraft type: Nimrod MR2
- Operator: Royal Air Force
- Registration: XV239
- Crew: 7
- Fatalities: 7
- Survivors: 0

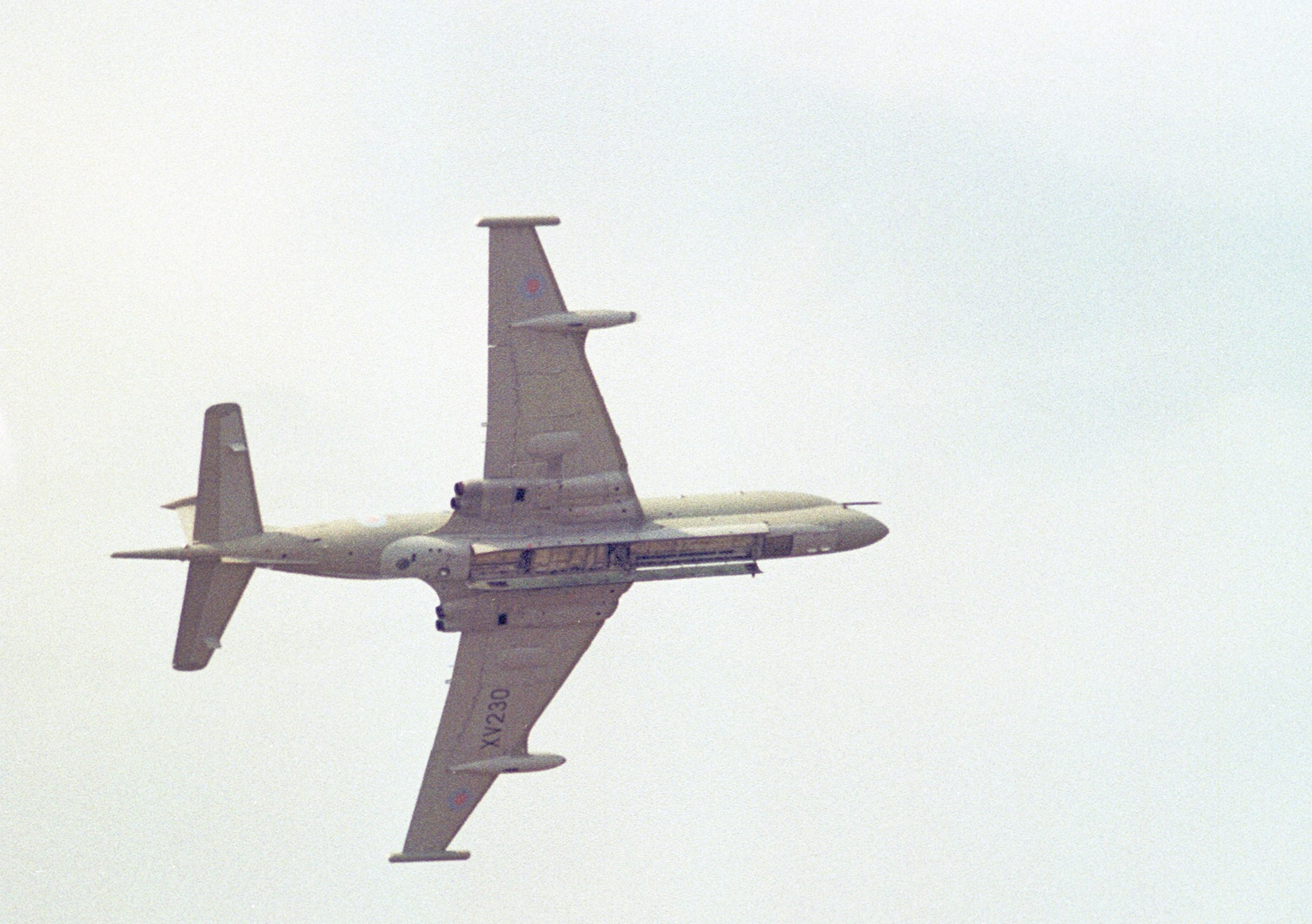
A Nimrod undertakes a typical display manouvre - a pass of the display line in a bank with the weapons bay open.

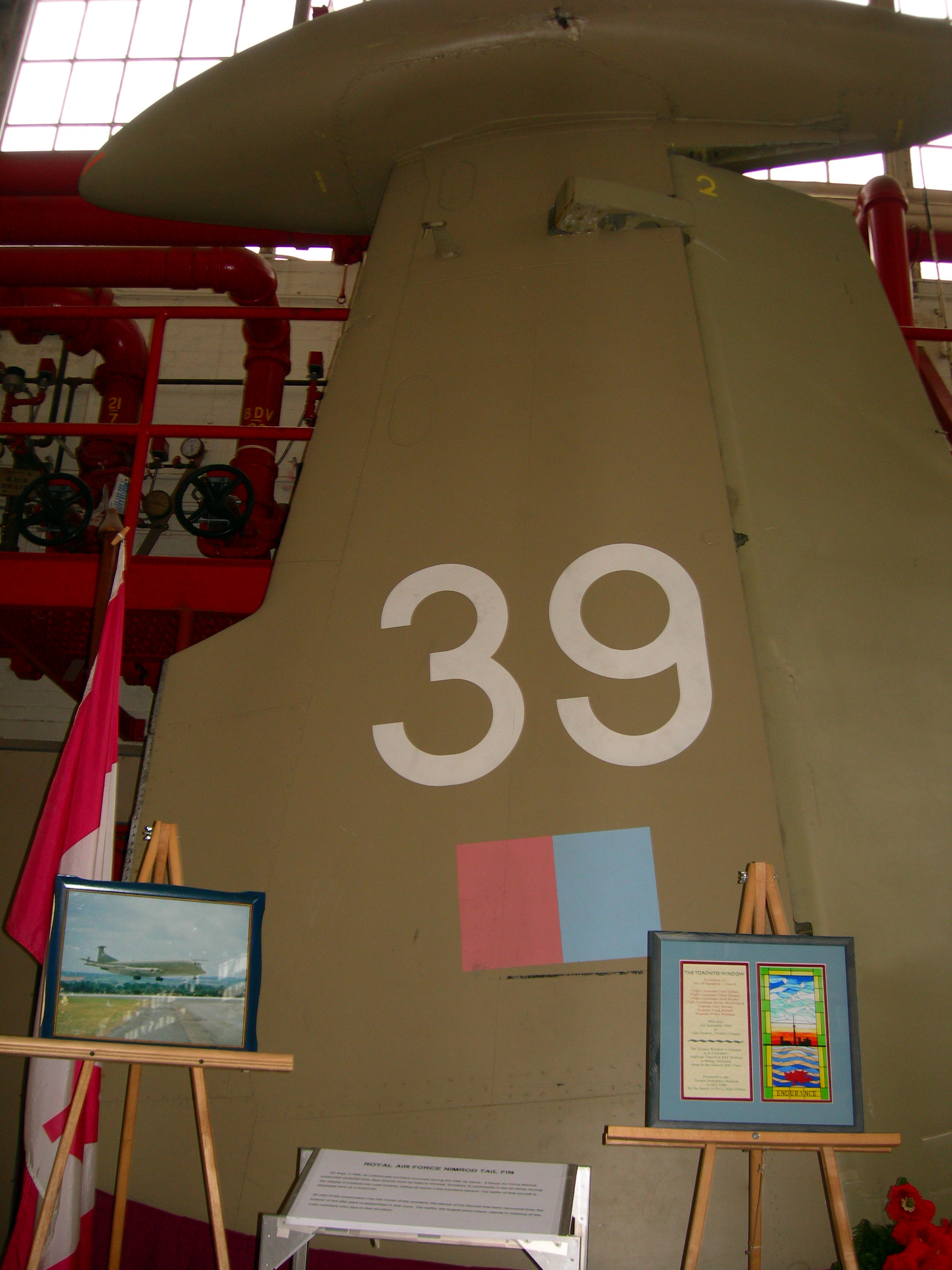
The vertical stabilizer of XV239 was salvaged and displayed as part of a memorial to the crew at the Toronto Aerospace Museum. The tail has since been returned to the UK.

On 2 September 1995, a Royal Air Force Hawker Siddeley Nimrod aircraft crashed into Lake Ontario during an air display, killing all seven crew members on board. This was the second loss of an RAF Nimrod in four months, following the ditching of a Nimrod R1 in May.

== Aircraft ==
The aircraft involved was XV239, a Nimrod MR.2 maritime patrol aircraft from the Royal Air Force in Kinloss, Scotland. Operated by No. 120 Squadron, the aircraft was originally delivered to the RAF as an MR.1 in 1971, before being upgraded to the MR.2 standard in the mid 1970s.

== Background ==
On 23 August 1995, the aircraft and its crew had left Kinloss for Canada, where it was scheduled to take part in two separate air shows. On the 26 and 27 August, the aircraft participated in the Shearwater International Air Show at CFB Shearwater in Nova Scotia. Following this, it traveled to Toronto Pearson International Airport from where it would be based for the exhibition at the Canadian International Air Show (CIAS). Since the planned manoeuvres had been commonly performed in Nimrods for much of the previous twenty years, the four and a half minute routine described as "relatively straightforward". However, the day prior to the CIAS display, the aircraft's captain, Flight Lieutenant Dom Gilbert, stated in an interview that the plan was to approach the limits of the aircraft's performance.

== Crash details ==
On 2 September, the aircraft left Pearson Airport on time for its planned display slot. The exhibition was to take place offshore over Lake Ontario and the weather was classed as excellent with a slight on-shore wind. Having completed safety checks, the aircraft performed the standard display sequence for the Nimrod. The first manoeuvres were successfully completed, then the aircraft turned to the right to begin a climb at an attitude of 24°. Its engines were powered back and as it reached the top of its climb, its airspeed fell to 122 knots, well below the recommended 150 knots for that part of the manoeuvre. Its g-force load also went to 1.6g. The low speed and the g-loading led to a stall and the aircraft banked and pointed downwards. The aircraft was too low at this point to recover and it hit the water. The impact caused the airframe to break up, killing the seven crew on-board instantly.

== Recovery ==
The recovery effort was immediately set in motion; divers initially located the wreckage, which had broken into four sections, but were unable to locate the crew. To help with the search, a boat from the Toronto Police Service made its way to the crash site and dropped a remotely operated underwater vehicle containing sonar and video cameras. This was able to display images of the wreckage clearly to allow the recovery team to recover the bodies of the crew and debris from the aircraft.

== Investigation ==
A significant amount of data was available, given the public nature of the accident, and the RAF inquiry was able to determine that all of the aircraft's systems had been functioning normally, making it possible to rule out any mechanical or structural failure of the Nimrod as a potential cause. This resulted in the inquiry focusing on the actions of the crew, and in particular the aircraft's captain. It was determined that, at a previous display, he had made an error following the second dumb-bell turn that led to his crossing over the display line; this had not been reported as it should have been, which would have allowed analysis of the display manoeuvres before a scheduled practice run. Instead, on deploying to Canada, the captain amended the manoeuvre by tightening his turn to avoid crossing over the crowd through reducing engine power. This removed the safety margins for the aircraft in performing the display manoeuvres (primarily the dumb-bell) as it took it below the recommended speed and led to it stalling.

The inquiry identified a number of deficiencies in the training regime for Nimrod display that may have contributed to the accident. Primarily, it suggested that the lack of a structured training programme, with theory and simulation as well as practice flights, combined with a lack of supervision in the air, led the captain to try out techniques outside the recommended performance envelope of both the Nimrod and the display.

== Aftermath ==
The recommendations of the RAF inquiry as regards the display of the Nimrod saw a change in the selection of display crews - up to this point, several Nimrod captains and crews per display season were selected. Following the inquiry, it was decided that a single crew, made up of instructors, would be specially selected from the Nimrod Operational Conversion Unit, rather than from operational squadrons.

== See also ==
- 1995 Royal Air Force Nimrod R1 ditching
- 2006 Royal Air Force Nimrod crash
- CityTV Toronto News Report about the Crash (YouTube)
