= 1994 South Pacific Airmotive DC-3 crash =

Douglas DC-3 crash in Sydney, New South Wales

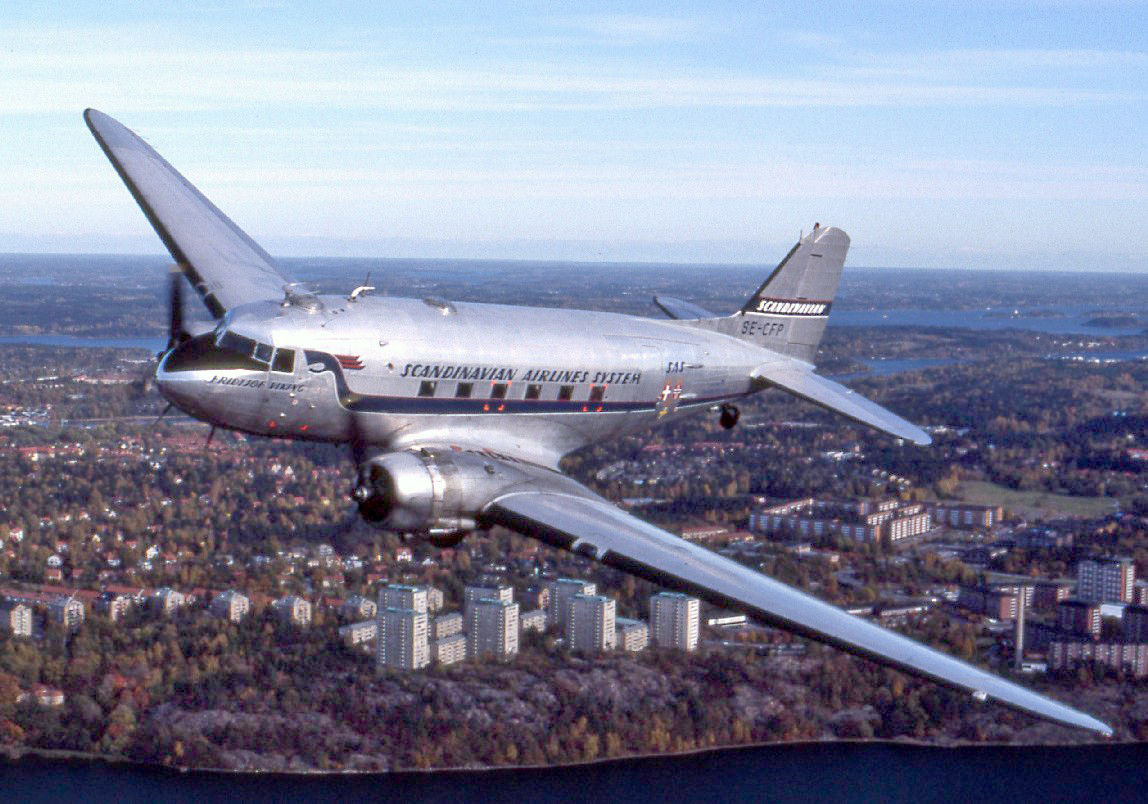
- DC-3 similar to accident aircraft

Accident
- Date: 24 April 1994
- Summary: Engine failure, pilot error
- Site: Sydney Airport, Sydney, New South Wales, Australia; 33°56′46″S 151°10′38″E

Aircraft
- Aircraft type: Douglas DC-3
- Operator: South Pacific Airmotive
- Call sign: ECHO DELTA CHARLIE
- Registration: VH-EDC
- Flight origin: Sydney Airport, Sydney, New South Wales, Australia
- Stopover: Lord Howe Island
- Destination: Norfolk Island
- Occupants: 25
- Passengers: 21
- Crew: 4
- Fatalities: 0
- Injuries: 1
- Survivors: 25

The 1994 South Pacific Airmotive DC-3 crash took place on 24 April 1994, when a Douglas DC-3 airliner operated by South Pacific Airmotive, tail number VH-EDC, ditched into Botany Bay shortly after takeoff from Sydney Airport in Sydney, New South Wales, Australia. The cause of the crash was determined by the Bureau of Air Safety Investigation (BASI; now the Australian Transport Safety Bureau, or ATSB) to have been a power loss in the aircraft's left engine caused by an inlet valve being stuck in the open position, compounded by inadequate action on the part of the pilots; Rod Lovell, the pilot in command of the flight, has disputed BASI's conclusions.

== Background ==
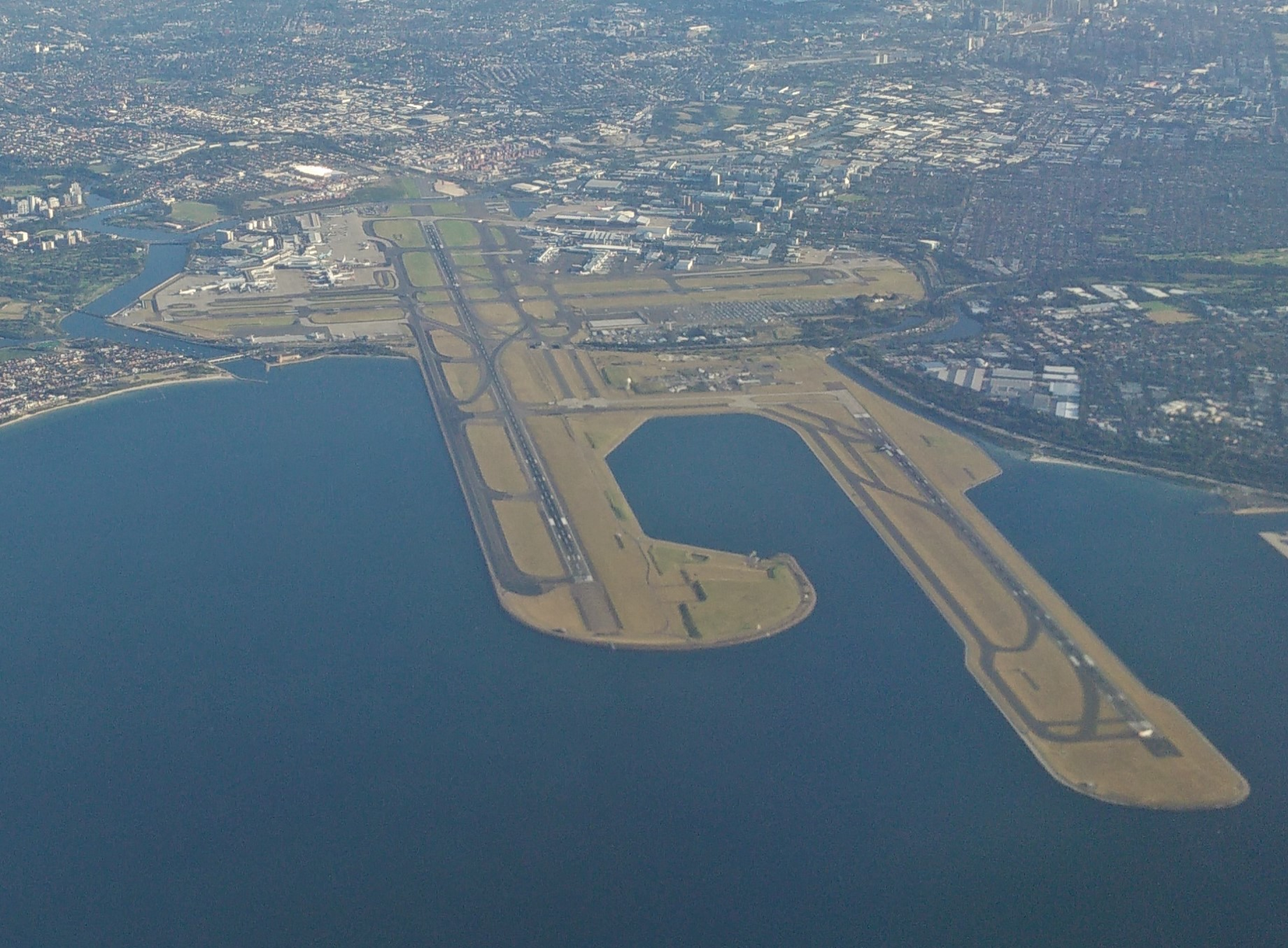
Sydney Airport, pictured in 2016; the DC-3 took off from runway 16R (left) and ditched abeam runway 16L (right). In 1994, runway 16L was still under construction and not suitable for landing.

The accident aircraft was a 50-year-old Douglas DC-3 which was owned and operated by South Pacific Airmotive, a charter airline based in Camden, New South Wales, and was flying under an Air Operators Certificate held by Groupair, which was based at Moorabbin, Victoria. The aircraft had been chartered to transport Scots College band students to Norfolk Island to perform in Anzac Day celebrations; there were twenty-one passengers including a team of journalists from the newspaper The Australian.

A flight plan, submitted by Captain Rod Lovell, indicated that the aircraft was to proceed from Sydney Airport to Norfolk Island, with an intermediate landing at Lord Howe Island to refuel. The flight was to be conducted in accordance with IFR procedures, and would depart from Sydney at 9am.

== Accident ==
Preparations for departure were completed shortly before 9am, and the aircraft was cleared to taxi for runway 16. Captain Lovell occupied the left control position, while his first officer was the handling pilot for the departure. The aircraft was cleared for takeoff at 9.07am. The crew subsequently reported to crash investigators that all engine indications were normal during the take-off roll and that the aircraft was flown off the runway at 81 knots.

During the initial climb, at approximately 200 feet, the crew heard a series of popping sounds above the engine noise. Almost immediately the aircraft began to yaw left, and at 9.04am Lovell advised Sydney air traffic control (ATC) that the aircraft had a problem. The co-pilot determined that the left engine was malfunctioning. The crew subsequently recalled that the aircraft speed at this time had increased to at least 100 knots. Lovell, having verified that the left engine was malfunctioning, closed the left throttle and initiated propeller feathering action. During this period, full power was maintained on the right engine. However, the airspeed began to decay.

The co-pilot reported that he had attempted to maintain 81 KIAS but was unable to do so. The aircraft diverged to the left of the runway centreline. The co-pilot and the supernumerary pilot subsequently reported that almost full right aileron had been used to control the aircraft, but could not recall the skid-ball indication. The co-pilot reported that he had full right rudder or near full right rudder applied. When he first became aware of the engine malfunction, Lovell assessed that, although a landing back on the runway may have been possible, the aircraft was capable of climbing safely on one engine. However, when he determined that the aircraft was not climbing, and that the airspeed had reduced below 81 knots, Lovell took control and at 9.09am advised ATC that he was ditching the aircraft into Botany Bay.

Lovell manoeuvred the aircraft as close as possible to the southern end of the partially constructed runway 16L. The aircraft was ditched approximately forty-six seconds after the captain first advised ATC of the problem. The four crew and twenty-one passengers successfully evacuated through the aircraft's rear door before it sank, and were rescued by nearby fishermen. A photographer from The Australian, having just evacuated the aircraft, took photos of the ditched DC-3 as it sank. The passengers and crew were taken on board pleasure craft and transferred to shore. After initial assessment, they were transported to various hospitals. All were discharged by 2.30pm that afternoon with the exception of the sole flight attendant, who had suffered serious injuries.

== Investigation ==
The crash investigation, conducted by the Bureau of Air Safety Investigation (BASI; now the Australian Transport Safety Bureau, or ATSB), found that the circumstances of the accident were consistent with the left engine having suffered a substantial power loss when an inlet valve became stuck in the open position. The final report singled out the handling pilot's inability to obtain optimum asymmetric performance from the aircraft as the culminating factor in a combination of local and organisational factors that led to this accident. Contributing factors included the overloaded condition of the aircraft, an engine overhaul or maintenance error, non-adherence to operating procedures and lack of skill of the handling pilot.

Organisational factors relating to the plane's operators identified in the BASI report included inadequate communications between South Pacific Airmotive and Groupair, inadequate maintenance management, poor operational procedures and inadequate training. Organisational factors relating to the Civil Aviation Authority (CAA) identified in the report included inadequate communications between CAA offices, inadequate communications between the CAA and the plane's operators, poor operational and airworthiness control procedures, inadequate control and monitoring of South Pacific Airmotive, inadequate regulation; and poor training of staff.

=== Rod Lovell ===
Despite being praised by the passengers for his handling of the crisis, Captain Lovell was partly blamed in the BASI report for contributing to the crash and his piloting licence was suspended as a result. Lovell spent the next twenty-five years trying to clear his name and prove that the aircraft was solely at fault for the crash. In 2018, Lovell was invited to the Netherlands to handle the only certified DC-3 flight simulator in the world, and claimed that its outcome demonstrated that "my DC-3 was not producing the power and it had nothing to do with the allegation of above maximum take-off weight." The following year, Lovell released a book, From Hero to Zero, arguing he had been unfairly scapegoated by Australian aviation authorities.

== See also ==
- Aeroflot Flight 366
- US Airways Flight 1549
- Ural Airlines Flight 178
- RAF Nimrod ditching
