= Canadian International Air Show =

Aviation event in Toronto, Ontario, Canada

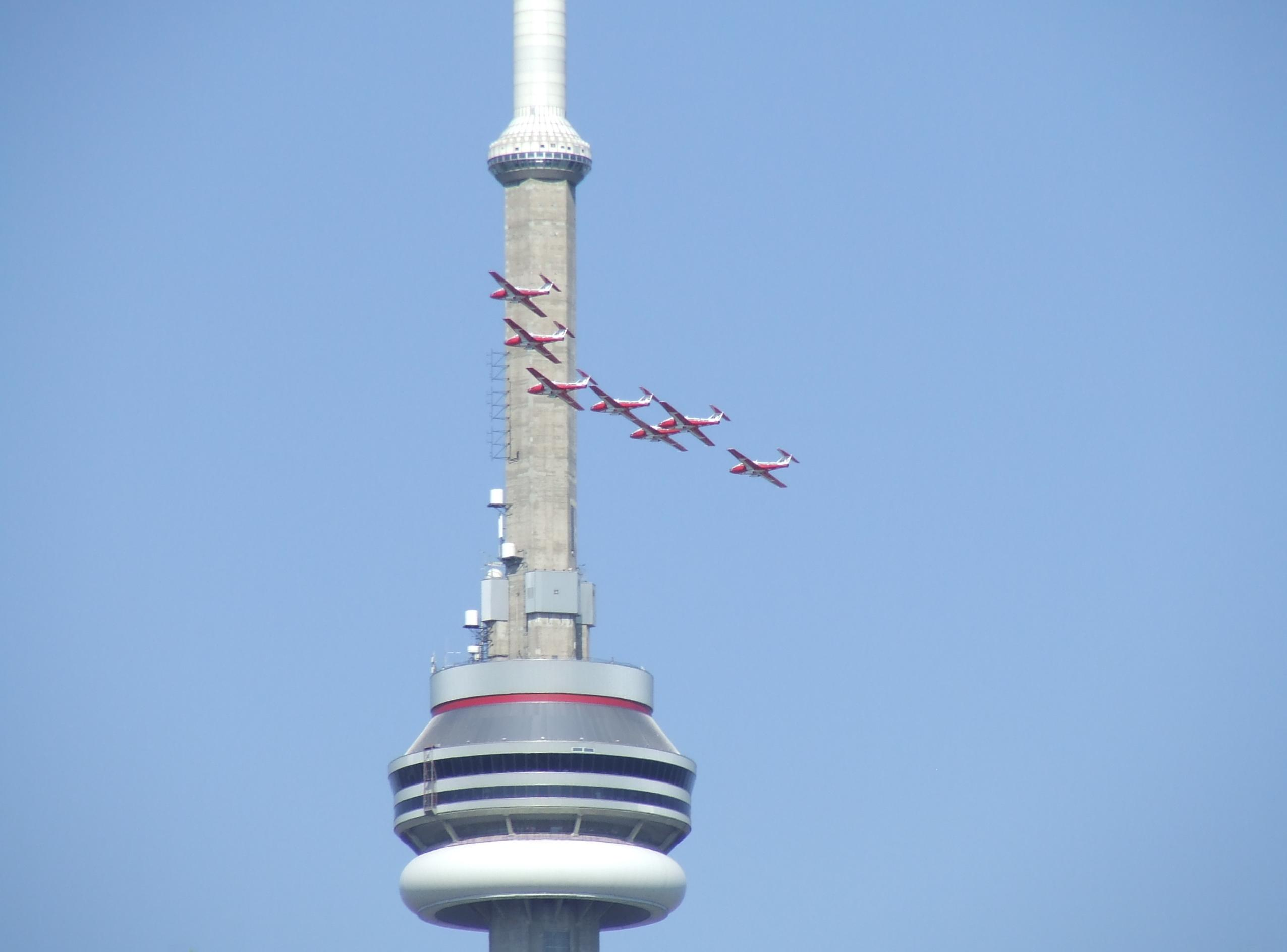
- The Snowbirds fly past the CN Tower during the 2007 show
- Genre: Air show
- Dates: September
- Frequency: Annually
- Locations: Toronto, Ontario
- Coordinates: 43°38′0″N 79°25′0″W
- Country: Canada
- Established: 1946
- Major events: Aerobatic displays
- Organizer: Canadian International Air Show
- Website: http://www.cias.org/

The Canadian International Air Show (CIAS) is an annual air show in Toronto, Ontario, Canada. The show is an aeronautical display of military, government and civilian aircraft, primarily from Canada and the United States. The show takes place along Toronto's waterfront for three days during the Canadian Labour Day weekend. The show began in 1946 and has been held at Exhibition Place since 1949.

== History ==
Toronto was the site of numerous air shows as the city developed into a centre of air transportation and aircraft manufacturing in the early twentieth century. The Canadian International Air Show began in 1946 when the National Aeronautical Association of Canada attracted overflow crowds to a show at de Havilland Canada manufacturing plant at Downsview Airport. The show became an annual event. The air show moved to Exhibition Place in 1949. In 1956, the air show became affiliated with the annual Canadian National Exhibition (CNE).

== Present ==
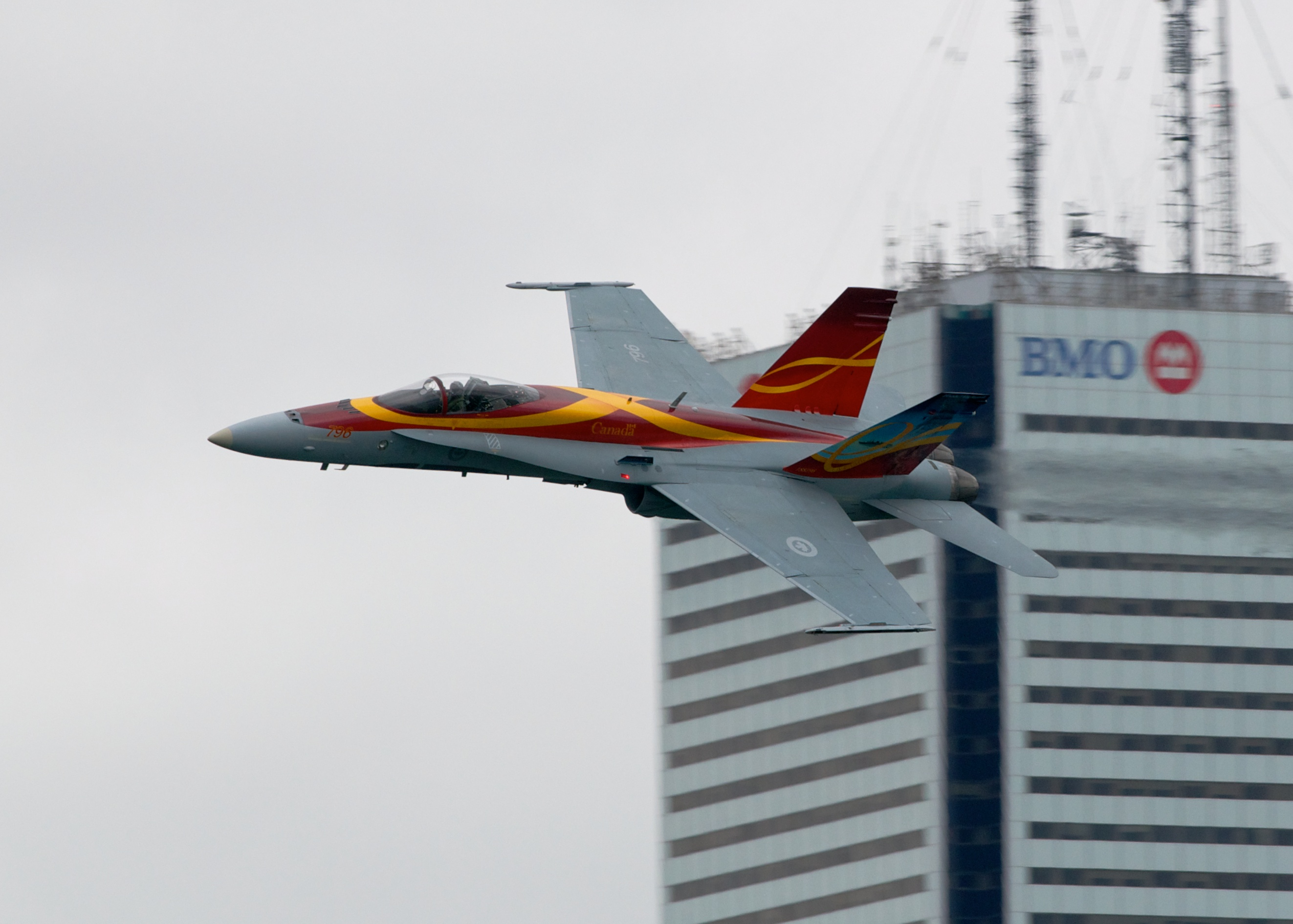
McDonnell Douglas CF-18 Hornet at the 2011 show

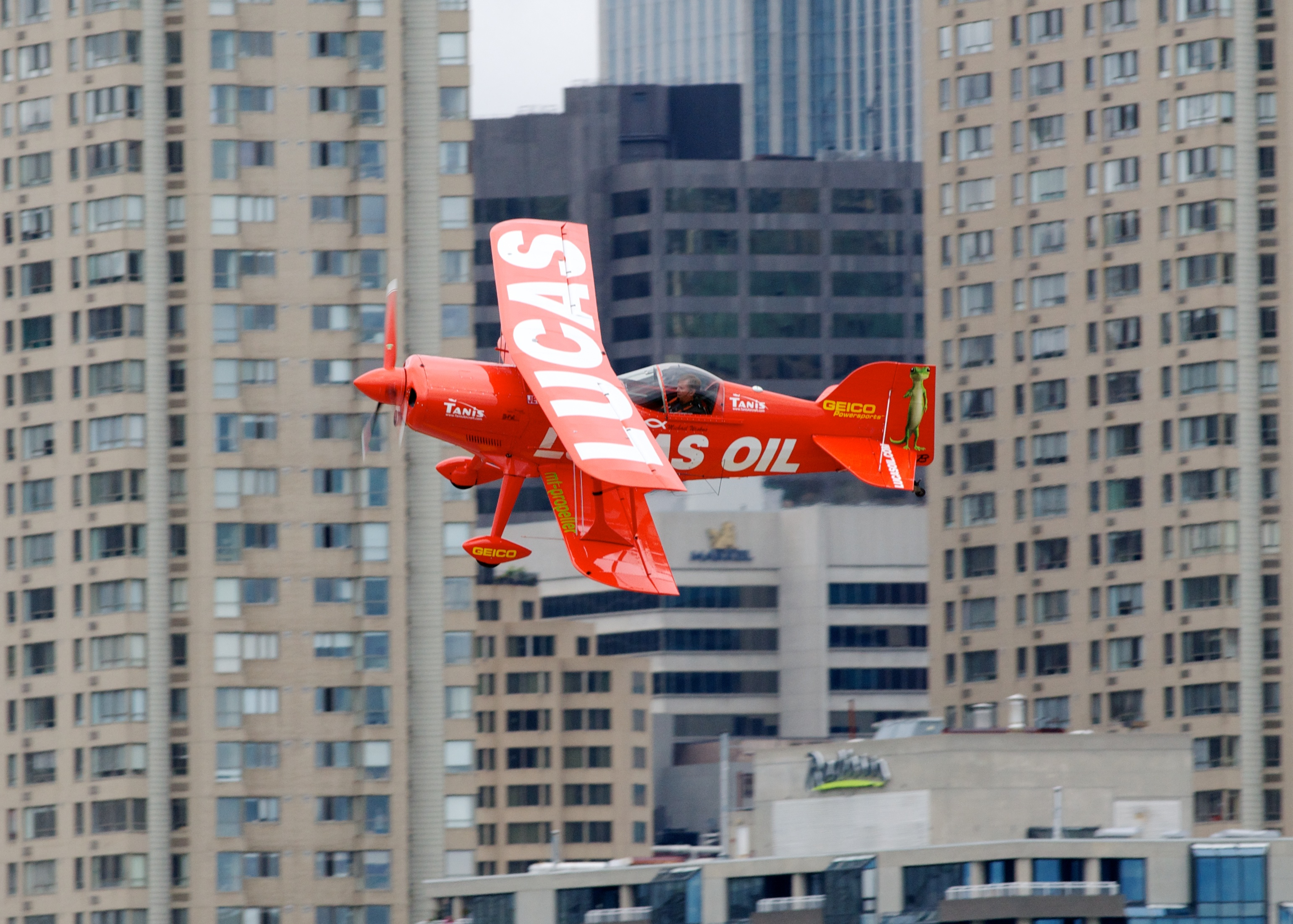
Pitts Special at the 2011 show

The official CIAS takes place over the Canadian Labour Day Weekend, which coincides with the closing weekend of the CNE. The start time for the show is scheduled for 12:00 pm with the show ending at approximately 3:00 pm each afternoon. The CIAS practice session is usually held on the day before the official CIAS, taking place between 10:00 am and 2:00 pm

The show is performed over Lake Ontario directly south of Exhibition Place. It can be best viewed from Exhibition Place or Ontario Place, although the show is visible from any other lakefront site, especially Marilyn Bell Park or Coronation Park. Performers fly in from Pearson, as well as the island airport on nearby Toronto Islands. Admission to the air show is free; however, viewing from Exhibition Place requires paid admission to the CNE.

There is no static display of aircraft. A photo tour at Pearson had been introduced in 1993 and a full static display in 1996. Although a success, the display was cancelled by the time of the 1998 air show.

In 2020, both the air show and that summer's Canadian National Exhibition were cancelled due to the global COVID-19 pandemic. In 2021, the air show took place, even though the CNE was cancelled.

Shortly before the 2026 show, the United States Air Force F-16 Demonstration Team withdrew from the event. Organizers attributed the withdrawal to last-minute scheduling changes beyond the show's control and denied that it was connected to tensions between Canada and the United States. The September 5–7 show proceeded with a lineup that included returning appearances by Redline Airshows, a Beechcraft Expeditor, a T-33 and a CP-140 Aurora.

=== Local opposition ===
The airshow is unpopular with some nearby residents who object to the noise created by the jet fighters participating in the show and others who object to the military participation. It has been noted that the noise of the jet fighter demonstrations specifically is similar to that experienced by persons in active war zones. In 2016, a Toronto Star columnist noted, "that in a city with a large population of refugee newcomers and people who have experienced the trauma of war it is insulting, invasive, and violent". Since 2012, during the airshow weekend, the Wikipedia article about the show has been repeatedly vandalized as a form of protest against the airshow, a phenomenon noted by the local Toronto media.

In 2021, Toronto City Councillor Joe Cressy called for an end to the air show and in 2023, Toronto Mayor Olivia Chow wrote air show organizers a letter saying: “Millions of Torontonians chose to take root in this City as a place of hope. A place of refuge. For many residents, the tremendous noise generated by high-powered jets flying overhead brings back unwanted memories of the violence and war they fled to call Toronto home.”

According to the City of Toronto, the air show "complies with all regulations, including those published by Transport Canada relating to noise."

== Performers ==
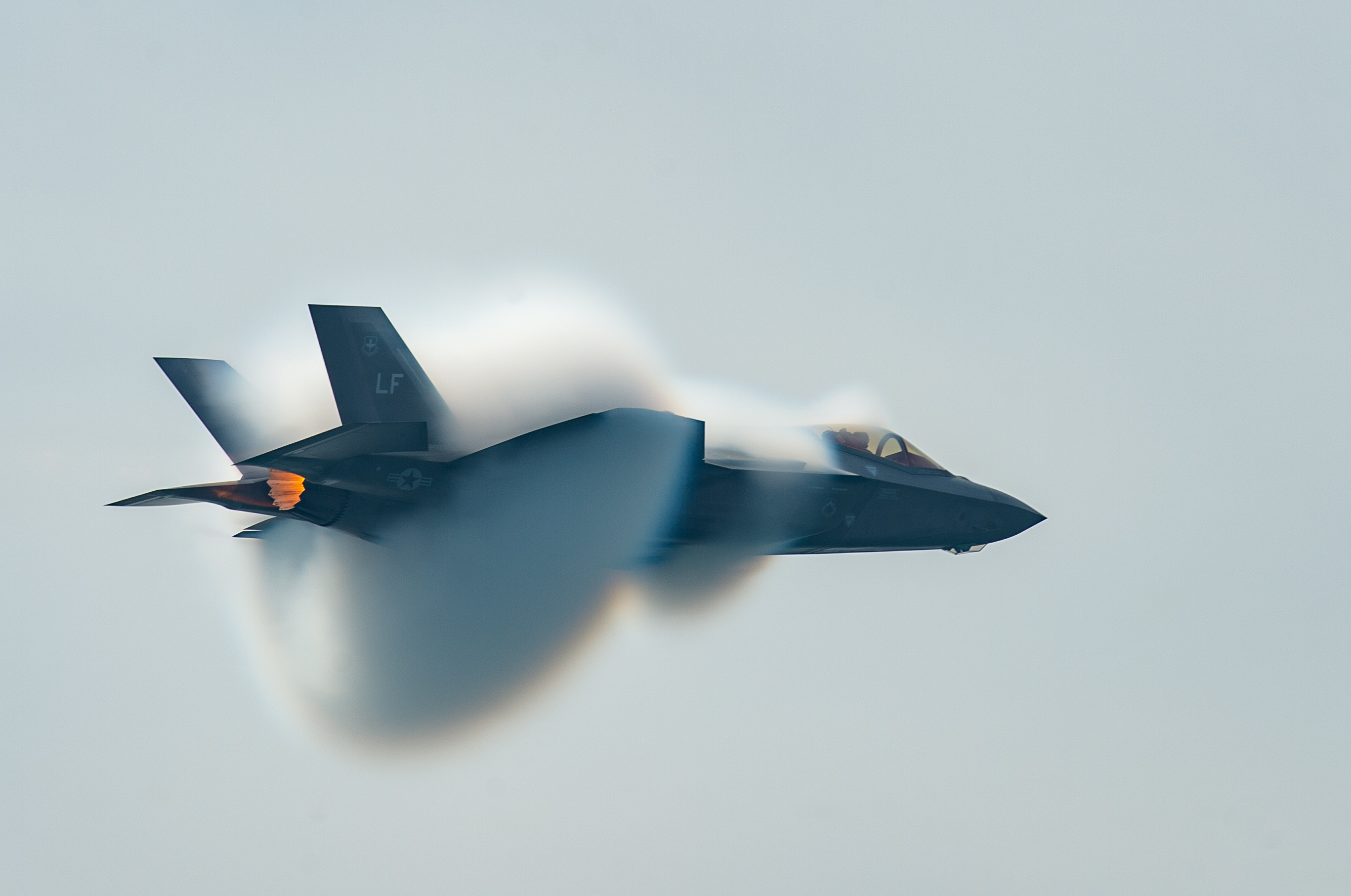
2018 appearance by the F35

The air show is typically a mix of Canadian and United States military aircraft, private aerobatic performers and civilian aircraft flypasts. The air show is often used by the Government of Canada to display new aircraft in the use of the government, such as search and rescue aircraft. On occasion, the air show has displayed unique civilian aircraft, such as the Concorde, and military aircraft of other nations. Flypasts have often included heritage military aircraft. The air show has included demonstrations of parachuting, aerial fire fighting and search and rescue missions.

Regular performers include the Snowbirds, other Canadian Armed Forces aircraft, the United States Air Force (USAF), and the United States Navy (USN). Past performers have included the Royal Canadian Air Cadets, the Canadian Harvard Aircraft Association, Vintage Wings of Canada, as well as private aerobatics teams, and commercial airlines.

Notable appearances include;

- Aeronautica Militare Frecce Tricolori
- Avro Lancaster
- Boeing B-17 Flying Fortress
- Breitling Jet Team
- British Airways Concorde
- Canadair CF-104 Starfighter
- Canadian Forces CF-18 Hornet
- Luftwaffe Tornado
- Luftwaffe F-4 Phantom II
- Ministry of Natural Resources – CL-415 Water Bomber
- RAF Red Arrows
- RAF Vulcan
- RCAF CF-105 Arrow
- RCAF Golden Hawks
- USAF Thunderbirds
- USAF A-10 Thunderbolt II
- USAF B-1 Lancer
- USAF B-2 Spirit
- USAF B-36 Peacemaker
- USAF B-52 Stratofortress
- USAF F-15 Eagle
- USAF F-16 Fighting Falcon
- USAF F-22 Raptor
- USAF F-35 Lightning II
- USAF F-117 Nighthawk
- USAF SR-71 Blackbird
- USAF U-2 Dragon Lady
- USMC Harrier jump jet
- USN Blue Angels
- USN F-14 Tomcat
- USN F/A 18F Super Hornet (Rhino)

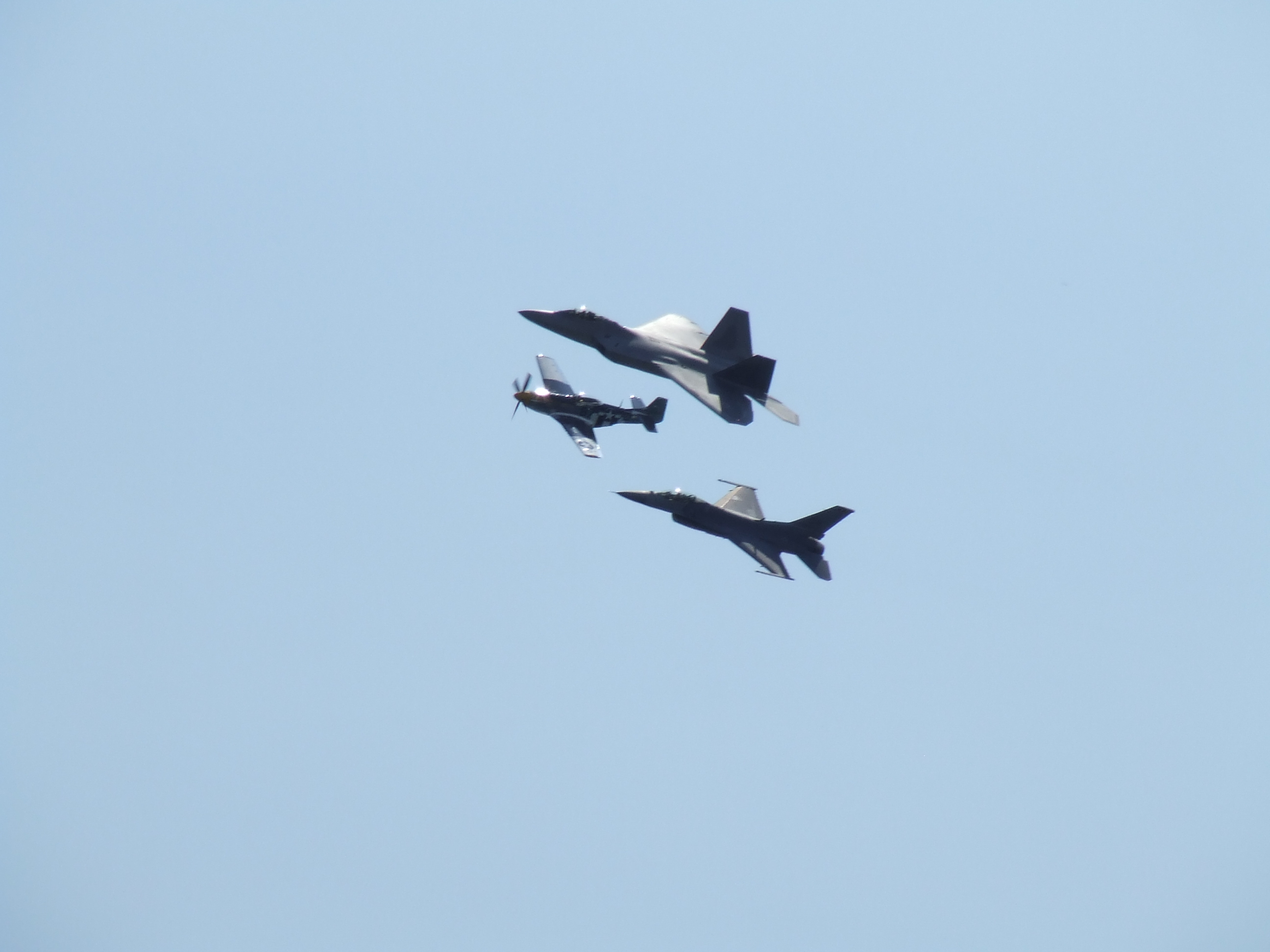
An F-22 Raptor, P-51 Mustang, and an F-16 in flight during the 2007 show.

== Accidents and incidents during air display ==
- 1946: United States P-80 Shooting Star overstressed during aerial display with wrinkles actually appearing in the fuselage. Aircraft was returned to Dayton on flatbed truck.
- September 20, 1952: Royal Canadian Air Force Avro Canada CF-100 Mk.3T piloted by S/L R.D. Schultz made a 500-knot high speed pass with vertical pull up, which overstressed the aircraft. The aircraft recovered to North Bay successfully.
- September 19, 1953: Royal Canadian Air Force Canadair Sabre 4, piloted by S/L W.R. Greene crashed into Lake Ontario, killing the pilot. The accident aircraft attempted loop recovery without sufficient altitude and hit Lake Ontario. A T-33 formation team also performing in the show shortened their performance due to low cloud and rain, and had entered clouds during looping manoeuvres.
- September 2, 1966: United States Navy Blue Angels pilot Lt. Cmdr. Dick Oliver was killed when he crashed his F-11 Tiger into a breakwater at the Toronto Island Airport. The airplane was travelling west-to-east across the exhibition waterfront, lost altitude and crashed. Debris injured two bystanders at the Island airport.
- September 5, 1976: A De Havilland DH-83C Fox Moth spun into Lake Ontario. The aircraft came to rest approximately 50–75 feet (15–23 m) from spectators on the shoreline in approximately 15 feet (4.6 m) of water. The pilot, Garth Martin, directed rescuers to a passenger, George Benedik, who was submerged in the wreck. Toronto Harbour Police (THP) Leading Hand (L/H) Robert Riekstins dove into the water three times before extracting Benedik from the wreck. Benedik was unconscious and without a pulse when loaded into a rescue boat. Rescuers successfully revived Benedik with external heart massage and mouth to nose artificial resuscitation (due to facial injuries). L/H Riekstins was later presented the Toronto Harbour Police Commissioners' Award of Merit medal for "heroism and dedication to duty".
- September 2, 1977: A Fairey Firefly crashed while attempting to pull up after a manoeuvre. The pilot, Allen Ness, who was a founding member of the Canadian Warplane Heritage Museum, stalled the aircraft and was killed.
- September 3, 1989: Canadian Forces Snowbird pilot Captain Shane Antaya died when, after a midair collision, his Canadair CT-114 Tutor crashed into Lake Ontario. During the same accident, team commander Major Dan Dempsey safely ejected from his aircraft.
- September 2, 1995: Seven Royal Air Force crew members were killed when their Hawker Siddeley Nimrod MR.2P stalled during a low altitude turn and crashed into Lake Ontario.
- September 6, 1998: Canadian Forces SkyHawks Parachute Team Master Corporal Andre-Luc Bisson suffered a compound leg fracture while landing during a parachute jump. His parachute got tangled in tree branches during tricky wind conditions. Three other members of the team landed outside the landing zone, two into spectators and one hitting a car. The previous day a team member landed on Lake Shore Boulevard.

== Accidents and incidents related to air show ==
- August 23, 1949: During practice, two Royal Canadian Navy Seafires collided over Malton. The commanding officer, LCdr Clifford "Clunk" Watson, and Lt. Charles Elton were killed.
- September 5, 1957: During practice, Royal Canadian Air Force Avro Canada CF-100 Mk.4B pulled up, flamed out, went into inverted spin and crashed. F/Os H.R. Norris and R.C. Dougall were killed.
- September 1, 2000: En route to aerial display, Helicopter Enstrom F28A bearing registration N9244 departed Toronto City Centre Airport with a fibreglass moose, known as Bruce the Moose, under hoist. At approximately 100 feet (30 m) the sling hook failed and the moose fell to the ground approximately 200 feet (60 m) from the departure point, just off of airport property. Although Bruce suffered minor damage he was able to perform his duties at the air show.
- September 4, 2000: En route to aerial display, Canadian Forces Snowbird Demonstration Team (431 Squadron) departed Toronto Pearson International Airport as a formation. Approximately 3 nautical miles (NM; 5.6 km) east of the airport an emergency was declared, the formation turned south and climbed to approximately 3,500 feet (1067 m). Approximately, 6 NM (11.1 km) south of the airport Snowbird 4 requested a landing. Snowbird 4's tail had collided in mid-air with Snowbird 1's left wing leading edge and belly smoke tank.
