= 1995 Royal Air Force Nimrod R1 ditching =

Aircraft accident in Scotland

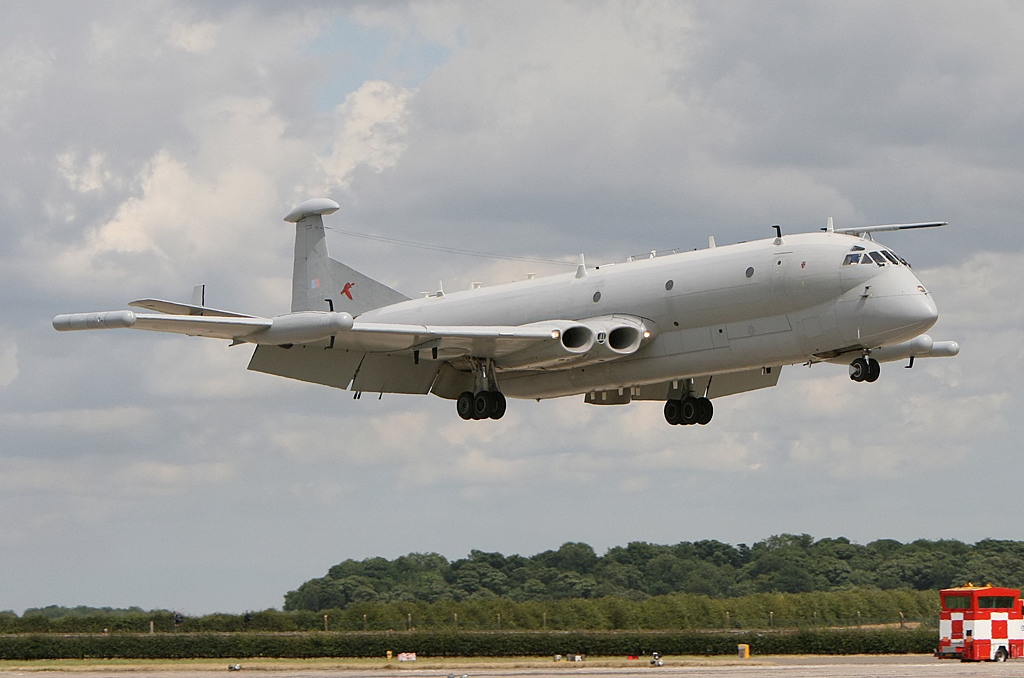
- Nimrod R.1, identical to the aircraft lost

Accident
- Date: 16 May 1995
- Summary: On board fire
- Site: Moray Firth, 7.2 km NE of RAF Kinloss

Aircraft
- Aircraft type: Nimrod R1
- Operator: Royal Air Force
- Registration: XW666
- Crew: 7
- Fatalities: 0
- Injuries: 6
- Survivors: 7

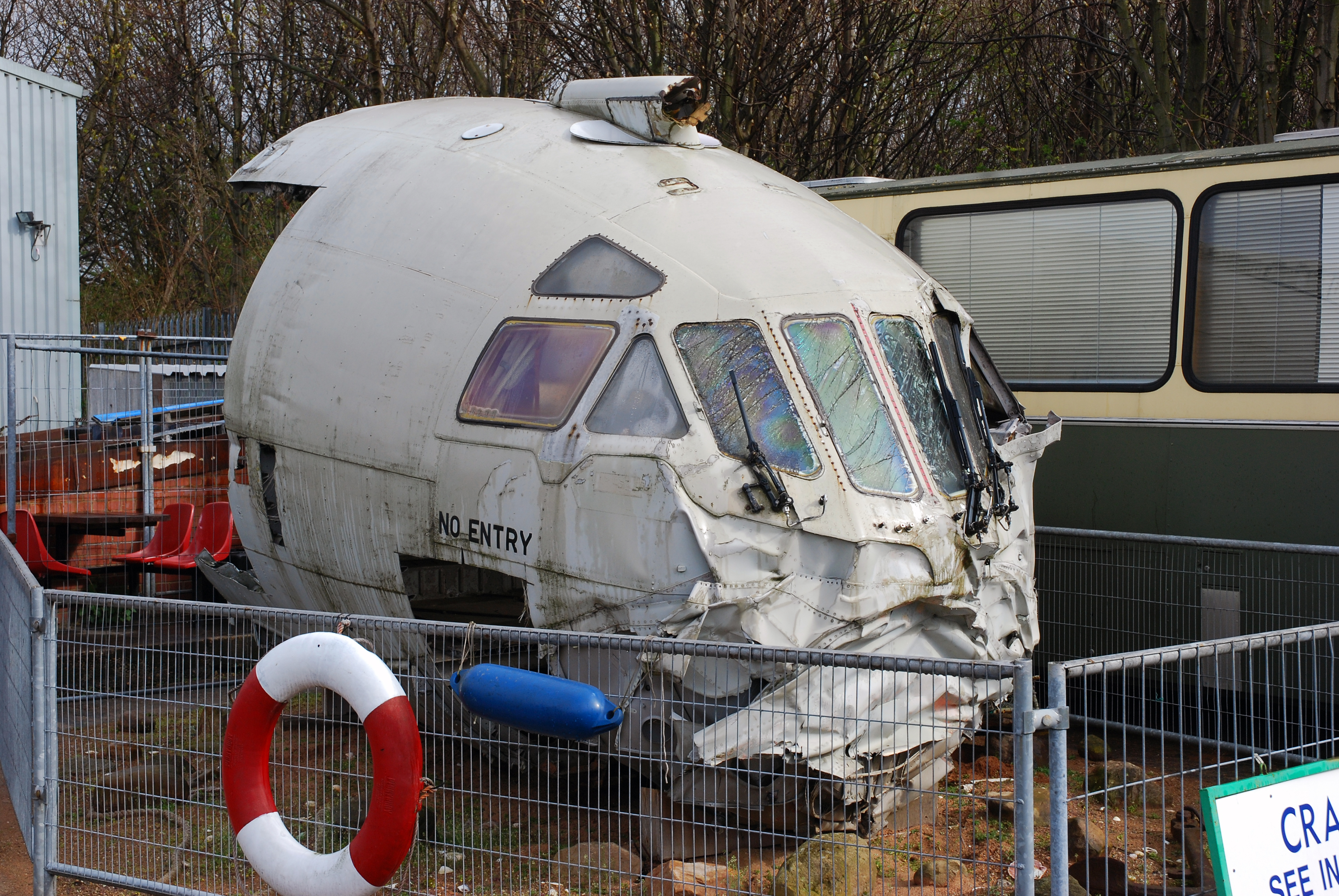
The salvaged cockpit of XW666 at South Yorkshire Air Museum

On Tuesday 16 May 1995, a Royal Air Force Nimrod R1 aircraft suffered an in-flight engine fire which led to the aircraft having to ditch in the Moray Firth. This was the first of two Nimrods to be lost in 1995; it was followed by the crash of a Nimrod MR2 in Canada in September.

== Aircraft ==
The aircraft involved was XW666, one of three specially converted Nimrod aircraft for use in the Signals Intelligence (SIGINT) gathering mission. The aircraft, operated by 51 Squadron, first flew in 1973, before being delivered to the RAF for entry into service in late 1974. At the time of the accident, the aircraft had undergone a major service at the Nimrod Major Servicing Unit (NMSU) at RAF Kinloss in Moray. As a result of its serial number, XW666 was unofficially referred to as "The Beast", and "Damien" owing to its connotation as the Number of the Beast.

== Crash details ==
On 16 May 1995, following the completion of major servicing work, XW666 had departed RAF Kinloss on a routine air test flight with a crew of seven on board. Thirty-five minutes into the flight, after a test of the anti-icing system, the fire warning light of number 4 engine came on. At this, the crew began the fire drill procedures but, while this was taking place, the warning light for the number 3 engine also illuminated. Following this, a member of the crew confirmed that the aircraft was indeed on fire, with panels falling from the starboard wing. At this point, the captain, who had attempted to divert to RAF Lossiemouth, elected to instead try and ditch the aircraft in the Moray Firth, as it was unclear whether the structural integrity would hold, and whether control could be maintained any longer. Despite the lack of flaps, which were not functional due to hydraulic failure associated with the fire, the pilot was able to make a controlled ditching on the waters of the Moray Firth. This caused the fuselage to break into two pieces, which eventually sank.

== Cause ==
Following an inquiry by the Air Accident Investigation Branch and the RAF, it was determined that the DC loom on the aircraft's Number 4 engine had somehow sustained damage prior to the flight. An arc occurred when the anti-icing system was turned on, which led to the engine air start sequence initiating. The engine was running idle as part of the testing regime during the flight, so when the starter turbine ran up to high speed, it caused a structural failure that led to the turbine disc puncturing one of the fuel tanks. The fuel leak was subsequently ignited, either by the high engine temperature, or the arc from the faulty loom.

== Aircraft replacement ==
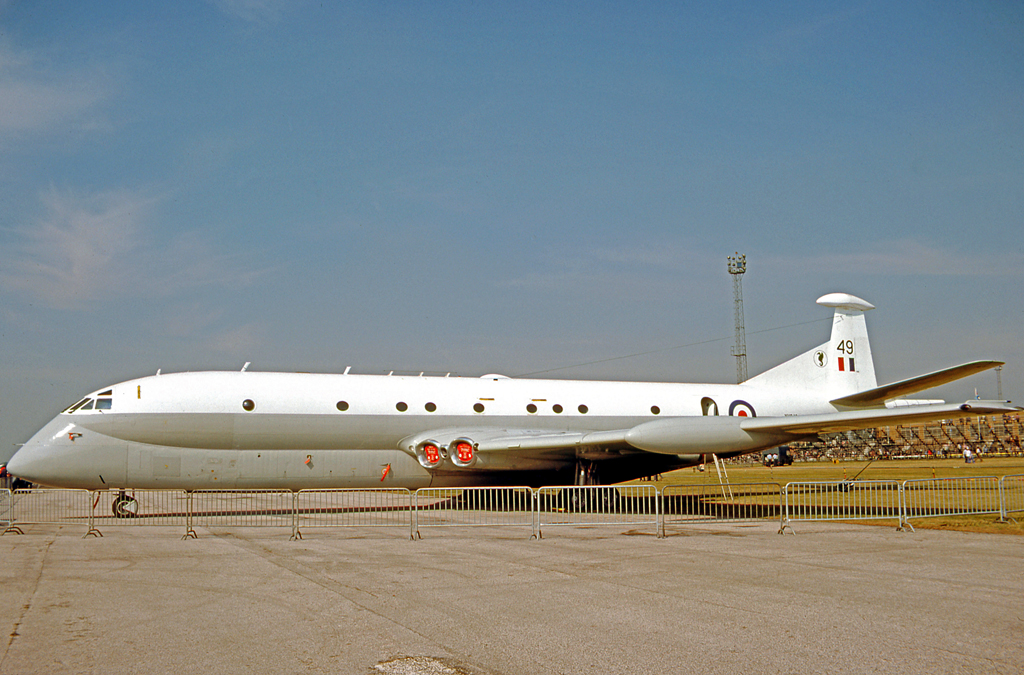
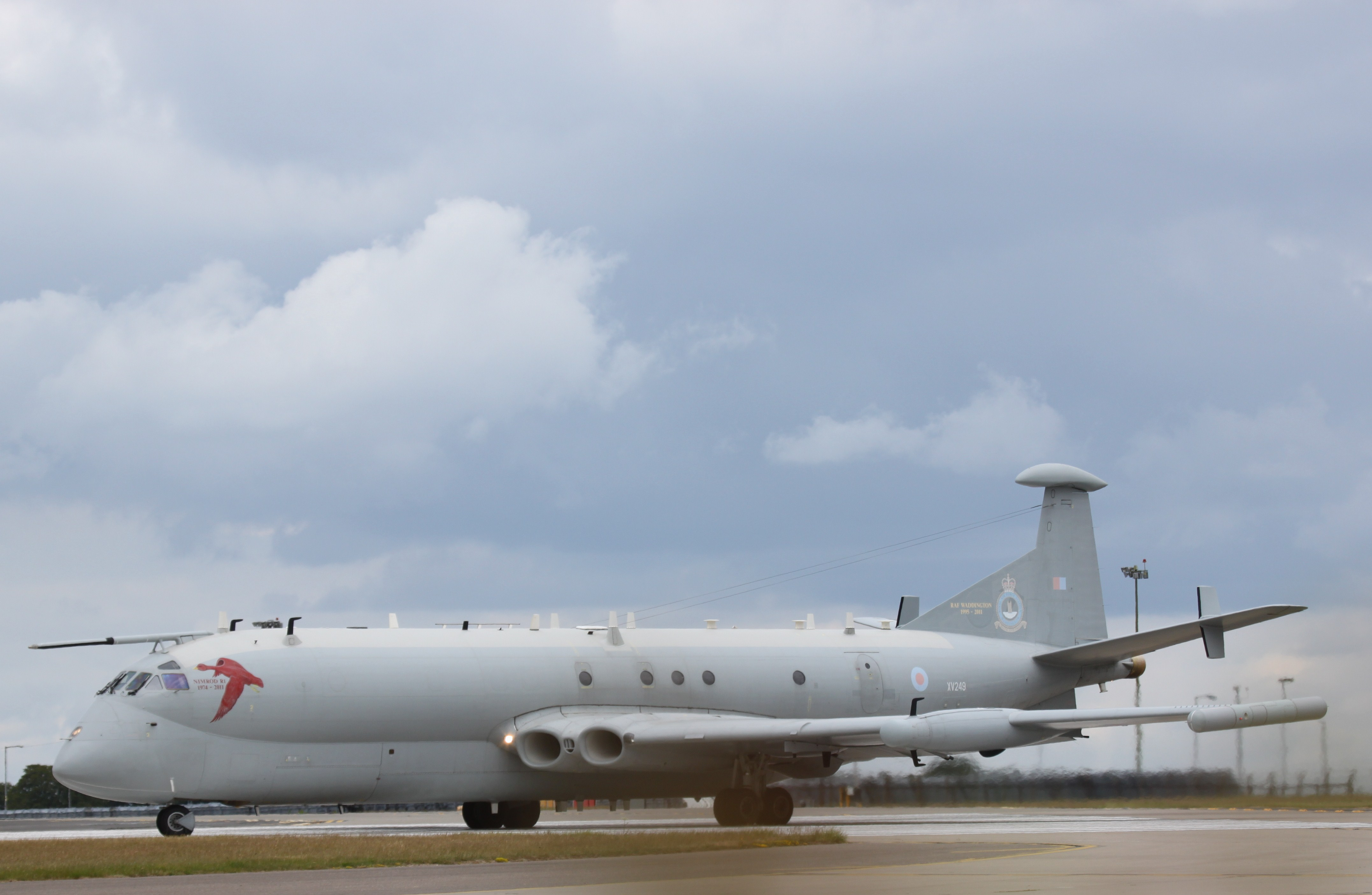
XV249 in its first configuration as an MR.1 (left), and its final configuration as an R.1 (right)

Because the Nimrod was not an ordinary MR2 maritime patrol aircraft, but rather one of the RAF's specialized SIGINT reconnaissance aircraft, the procurement of a replacement was given the highest priority. By 13 June 1995, four weeks after the crash, the Government had approved what became known as Project Anneka, after the BBC programme Challenge Anneka, with a budget of up to £30m. A stored MR2 was selected for conversion to R1 standard, after which it was serviced, before having its ASW equipment removed and a full set of the highly secret communications intelligence and electronic intelligence gathering equipment installed. The installation work and testing was eventually completed by 28 April 1997, and the new aircraft (XV249) was delivered to 51 Squadron.

== See also ==
- 1995 Royal Air Force Nimrod MR2 crash
- 2006 Royal Air Force Nimrod crash
