= Salmon Letters =

In Britain, Salmon Letters, or Crampton Letters (also known as Maxwellisation or Scott Compliance), are official letters sent out by a public inquiry to people who will be subject to criticism when the inquiry's report is released. The aim of the letter is to give the person a chance to prepare for the resultant exposure and possible legal recourse which may need to be taken when allegations against them become public. The letters also serve to inform someone of the allegations they may have to answer during the tribunal period of the inquiry which may become matters of interest to the public once the report is published.

Salmon Letters are named after Cyril Salmon, Baron Salmon, who first conceived of the idea in 1966 when chairing a report into how tribunals of inquiry were to be conducted.

The letters are also known as Maxwellisations after Robert Maxwell, who complained after criticism of his dealings in a public report. Other reports have delved further into this process, leading to them also being named after those reports, as Crampton Letters (Crampton v Secretary of State for Health 1993) and Scott Compliance (after the Scott Inquiry into the Matrix Churchill Affair (the ‘Arms to Iraq Inquiry’) published in 1996).

Salmon Letters are often sent out in the initial stages of an inquiry, with more dispatched later if further allegations are made. This is common in child abuse inquiries, such as the North Wales Child Abuse Inquiry which started in 1996. The Department for Education's guidelines on the matter (in relation to inquiries where under 18's are involved) include a sample letter which points out to alleged perpetrators that the resultant report has no connection to criminal or any other proceedings.

Salmon Letters have been sent out in most major public inquiries since first being recommended by Baron Salmon in his report Royal Commission on Tribunals of Inquiry (1966). In some cases, particularly the Chilcot Inquiry (into the Iraq war (2003-2010)) it has been cited that delay on the part of those being criticized, in responding to allegations, has led (in part) to a delay in the final report. The Scott Inquiry report noted that adherence to the rules of Salmon Letters had been 'unhelpful' in obtaining clarity.

Whilst the original 1966 report determined that the notification of an allegation was within the fairness of such an inquiry, the responsibility to send the letters out was not enshrined in the Inquiries Act of 2005. However, the Inquiries Rules Act of 2006 requires the chairperson of an inquiry to call the person's attention where the inquiry will be critical of their conduct. This would normally be in the form of a warning letter. The Act stipulates that;
...The inquiry panel must not include any explicit or significant criticism of a person in the report, or in any interim report, unless
a. the chairman has sent that person a warning letter; and
b. the person has been given a reasonable opportunity to respond to the warning letter.

== Selected inquiries ==
The table contains a selection of recent public inquiries that employed Salmon Letters. Note that Salmon letters are not always to individuals. The GMC received a letter warning of potential criticism.

Name	Subject	Date delivered	Notes
Shipman Inquiry Fourth Report	Dr. Harold Shipman	2004	Salmon Letters sent out with extra letters to be dispatched if further allegations came to light.
Stockwell 2	Death of Jean Charles de Menezes	July 2007	The IPCC also sent out letters to persons they did not directly allege against, but against whom witnesses made allegations.
Haddon-Cave Report	2006 XV230 Nimrod Crash	October 2009	Salmon principles adhered to and two RAF Officers were sent letters.
Chilcot Inquiry	The report of the Iraq Inquiry	July 2016	The report was beset by delays, being authorized in 2009 but not delivered until 2016 (despite its last witness being interviewed in 2011). Salmon Letters were again blamed (in the press) for adding to the delay as those being criticized objected.
