= 2006 Royal Air Force Nimrod crash =

Airplane crash over Afghanistan

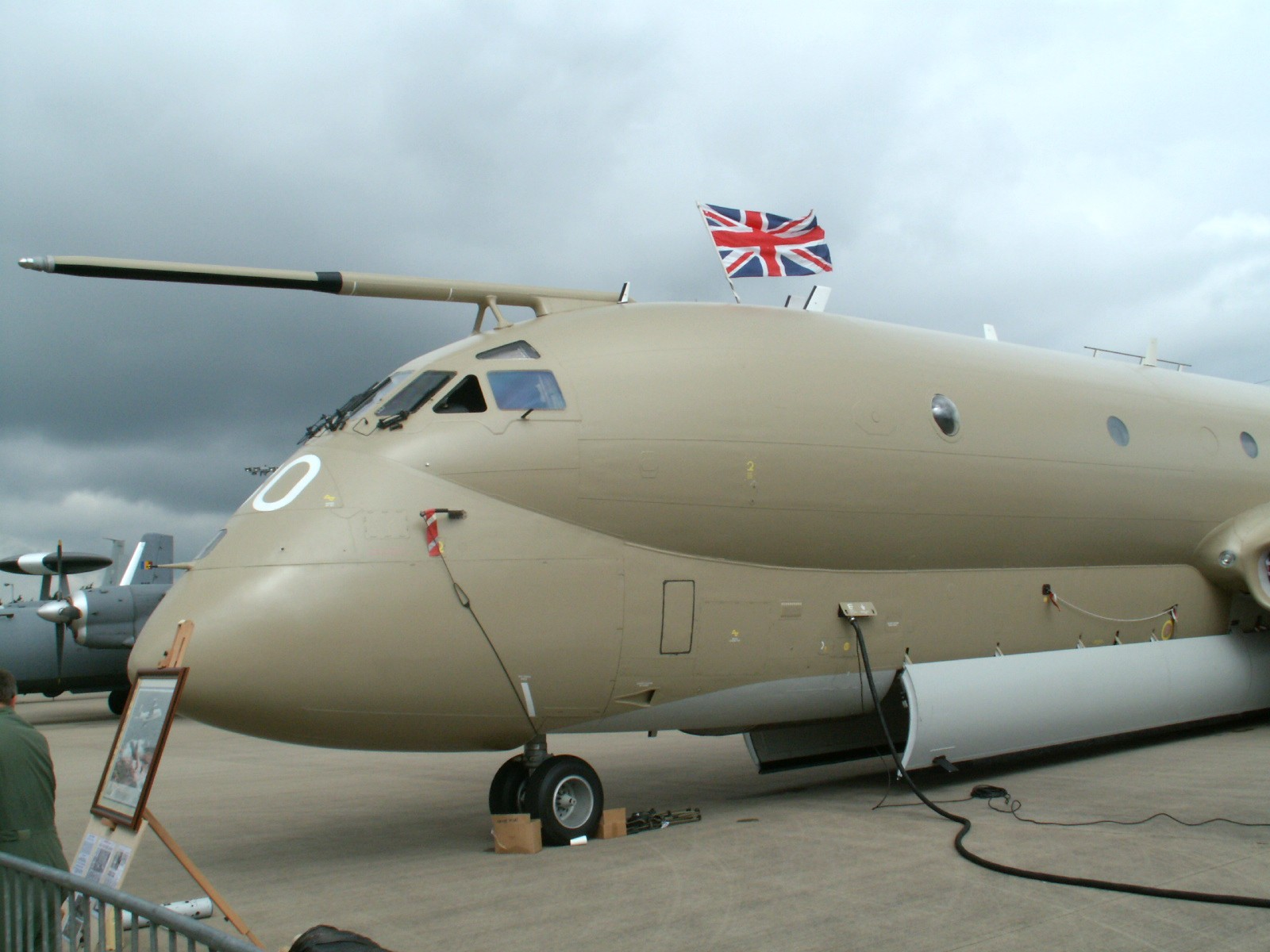
- XV230 at the Waddington Airshow, July 2005

Accident
- Date: 2 September 2006
- Summary: On board fire following aerial refuelling
- Site: Chalaghor in the Panjwaye District of Kandahar, Afghanistan

Aircraft
- Aircraft type: Nimrod MR2
- Operator: Royal Air Force
- Registration: XV230
- Occupants: 14
- Crew: 14
- Fatalities: 14
- Survivors: 0

On 2 September 2006, a Royal Air Force Hawker Siddeley Nimrod suffered an in-flight fire and subsequently crashed in Kandahar, Afghanistan, killing all fourteen crew members on board. The crash, which occurred during a reconnaissance flight, was the biggest single loss of life suffered by the British military since the Falklands War.

== Aircraft ==
The aircraft involved in the accident was XV230, the first of 38 Nimrod maritime reconnaissance/strike aircraft to enter operational service with the Royal Air Force on 2 October 1969. At a ceremony held at Woodford airfield in Cheshire, the aircraft was handed over by the deputy managing director of Hawker Siddeley Aviation, Sir Harry Broadhurst. Receiving XV230 was the Air Officer Commanding-in-Chief of Coastal Command, Air Marshal Sir John Lapsley. At Broadhurst's invitation, Lady Lapsley performed the naming ceremony. Later in the day a RAF crew flew XV230 to its base at RAF St Mawgan, Cornwall, where the Nimrod maritime operational training unit (MOTU) was to be formed.

According to Jane's Information Group, XV230 was one of six Nimrods equipped with an L-3 Wescam MX-15 electro-optical turret in 2003. In June/July 2006 XV230 was given the capability to transmit real-time video imagery from the MX-15 to ground stations and commanders. This was implemented under Project Broadsword.

== Crash details ==
The aircraft is believed to have suffered a fuel leak or overflow during mid-air refuelling while it was monitoring Operation Medusa, a NATO offensive against Taliban insurgents west of Kandahar. The investigation found that fuel most probably travelled from a fuel tank blow-off valve on the starboard side of the lower-forward fuselage into an aft bay near the root of the starboard wing which contained hot air ducting pipes, where it saturated compressed insulation contained within a shrouding, holding the fuel against a hot air pipe until it reached auto-ignition temperature and caught fire.

The fire was first noted when smoke accumulated in the bomb-bay, leading the pilot to report it. He tried to reach Kandahar air base, taking the aircraft down from 23,000 to 3,000 feet (7,010 to 910 metres) in 90 seconds. An RAF Harrier GR7 aircraft followed the Nimrod down and the pilot saw a wing explode, followed a few seconds later by the rest of the aircraft.

The crash site was about 25 miles (40 kilometres) west-north-west of Kandahar Airfield (which is located 10 miles (16 kilometres) south-east of the city of Kandahar) between two villages called Chil Khor and Fatehullah Qala in the Panjwaye District.

The twelve RAF personnel plus a Royal Marine and a British Army soldier aboard Nimrod MR2 XV230 were killed. A board of inquiry report was released in December 2007.

== Controversy ==
There had been concerns in the British media about serviceability of the Nimrod fleet and bereaved families having to wait for years for the Oxfordshire coroner's office to hold inquests into military deaths. Conservative MP Ian Liddell-Grainger called for the MR2's replacement – the BAE MRA4 – to be introduced sooner. That aircraft suffered significant problems during development and construction which resulted in lengthy programme delays and the in-service date slipping nine years from 2003 to 2012. The MR4 replacement aircraft was cancelled entirely following the 2010 Strategic Defence and Security Review.

Concerns were again raised when on 5 November 2007, Nimrod XV235 was reported to have suffered a similar fuel leak. The aircraft landed safely. The Ministry of Defence (MoD) then suspended all in-flight refuelling of the Nimrod fleet.

The Scottish National Party's Westminster leader, Angus Robertson, criticised delays in inquiries. He said the wait for the MoD inquiry and a coroner's inquest was a "disgrace" that dates have still to be set for the publication of the board of inquiry's findings and a coroner's inquest into the deaths. He was also quoted as saying "Everybody's thoughts are with the families and friends of those who lost their lives. They are having to wait far too long to receive answers to many questions. A 12-month wait is a disgrace – Publication dates have been put back and put back and the Ministry of Defence should get on with it."

In March 2009, following continued questions about the safety of the Nimrod fleet and despite constantly stating that the aircraft were airworthy, the MoD grounded the Nimrod fleet for "vital safety modification[s]". Engine bay hot air ducts and fuel seals were to be replaced.

There are those who opine that the loss was a foreseeable consequence of design and production failures.

Concerns about the safety of the Nimrod fleet continued to surface after the loss of XV230. In April 2009 it was reported that the Defence Minister had "glossed over Nimrod safety fears". The Independent newspaper claimed that a report into the safety of Britain's ageing fleet of Nimrods, which a defence minister claimed did not reveal "any significant airworthiness issues", exposed almost 1,500 faults – 26 of which threatened the aircraft's safety.

== Board of Inquiry findings ==
On 4 December 2007 the report of the findings of the official Board of Inquiry into the loss of XV230 was published. The Board believed that the No 7 tank dry bay was the most likely location for the seat of the fire, with the most probable cause being escaped fuel having come into contact with a Supplementary Conditioning Pack (SCP) airpipe at 400 degrees Celsius "...after entering a gap between two types of insulation". Four separate factors were listed as contributing to the accident: Age of the aircraft; Maintenance policy; Failure of hazard analysis and lack of a fire detection and suppression system; Not identifying the full implications of successive changes to the fuel system and associated procedures.

A link to the full report on the XV230 accident can be found here.

On 23 May 2008, the assistant deputy coroner for Oxfordshire, Andrew Walker, handed down a narrative ruling, stating that the entire Nimrod fleet had "never been airworthy from the first time it was released to the service nearly 40 years ago... It seems to me that this is a case where I would be failing in my duty if I didn't report action to the relevant authority that would prevent future fatalities... I have given the matter considerable thought and I see no alternative but to report to the secretary of state that the Nimrod fleet should not fly until the ALARP [as low as reasonably practicable] standards are met.", urging that the Nimrod fleet be grounded. He further added: "This cavalier approach to safety must come to an end. There were failures...[in monitoring the aircraft's safety]...that should, if the information had been correctly recorded and acted upon, have led to the discovery of this design flaw within the Nimrod fleet."

== Nimrod Review ==
External image
- Nimrod MR1 XV230 cutaway and weapon loadout
- Marsden, John (2006), "An old 1970's cutaway of Nimrod MR1 XV230 retouched by Flight Global in 2006.", Flight Global, archived from the original on 20 October 2012

The Terms of Reference for the Nimrod Review were set out by the Secretary of State for Defence, Des Browne, on 13 December 2007.

It emerged in May 2009 that a RAF commander destroyed a number of official documents after the loss of Nimrod XV230. The Times newspaper, 31 May 2009, reported that all documents relating to the aircraft were immediately impounded but Sqn Ldr Guy Bazalgette, commander of the Nimrod detachment in the Gulf, managed to retrieve one file. Bazalgette subsequently destroyed the document but later told the coroners inquest that none of the shredded documents were relevant to the loss of XV230. However, Bazalgette admitted: "They should not have been shredded and it was my fault that they were."

Also in May 2009, Charles Haddon-Cave, QC, leading the Nimrod Review issued a number of Salmon letters to organisations and senior RAF officers warning them they were likely to be criticised in its formal report. The so-called Salmon letters give those who are likely to be criticised by the inquiry the opportunity to respond to the criticism before the report's publication. The MoD and the Nimrod inquiry team declined to say which senior RAF officers received letters.

On 28 October 2009, Haddon-Cave presented his report, summarised in several short statements, like:

- Summary No. 9:
  The Nimrod Safety Case represented the best opportunity to capture the serious design flaws in the Nimrod which had lain dormant for years. If the Nimrod Safety Case had been drawn up with proper skill, care and attention, the catastrophic fire risks to the Nimrod MR2 fleet presented by the Cross-Feed/SCP duct and the Air-to-Air Refuelling modification would have been identified and dealt with, and the loss of XV230 in September 2006 would have been avoided.
- Summary No. 10:
  Unfortunately, the Nimrod Safety Case [produced by BAE Systems] was a lamentable job from start to finish. It was riddled with errors. It missed the key dangers. Its production is a story of incompetence, complacency, and cynicism. The best opportunity to prevent the accident to XV230 was, tragically, lost.

The report:

- Accused the MoD of "deep organisational trauma" resulting from the strategic defence review of 1998.
- Sacrificing safety to cut costs, resulting in a "systemic breach" of the military covenant.
- A safety review of the Nimrod MR2 carried out by the MoD, BAE Systems and QinetiQ was deemed a "lamentable job".

Haddon-Cave condemned the change of organisational culture within the MoD between 1998 and 2006, when financial targets came to distract from safety, quoting a former senior RAF officer who told the inquiry:

There was no doubt that the culture of the time had switched. In the days of the RAF chief engineer in the 1990s, you had to be on top of airworthiness. By 2004 you had to be on top of your budget if you wanted to get ahead.

Haddon-Cave directly criticised 10 individuals in the report – five at the MoD, three at BAE Systems and two at QinetiQ – while throughout the review BAE Systems had been a company "in denial." Haddon-Cave's report directly criticised two RAF officers:

- Air Commodore George Baber – a group captain at the time, led the MoD integrated project team responsible for a safety review of the RAF's Nimrods, which took place between 2001 and 2005. Haddon-Cave accused Baber of a "fundamental failure of leadership" in drawing up the "safety case" into potential dangers in the fleet: "He failed to give the NSC (Nimrod safety case) the priority it deserved. In doing so, he failed, in truth, to make safety his first priority."
- Wing Commander Michael Eagles – then head of air vehicle for the Nimrod, Wing Cdr Eagles was supposed to be in charge of managing production of the safety review. The report found that he delegated the project "wholesale" to an MoD civilian worker who was too inexperienced and not competent to manage it: "Michael Eagles failed to give adequate priority, care and personal attention to the NSC task. He failed properly to utilise the resources available to him within the Nimrod IPT to ensure the airworthiness of the Nimrod fleet."

Defence Secretary Bob Ainsworth said the "rigorous" report would make distressing reading for the relatives of those who died.

On behalf of the MoD and the Royal Air Force, I would like again to say sorry to all the families who lost loved ones. I am sorry for the mistakes that have been made and the lives that have been lost as a result of our failure. Nothing I can say or do will bring these men back.

== Legal proceedings ==
In December 2008 the Defence Secretary John Hutton was served with a writ by relatives of two of 14 men who died.

In March 2009 in response to the writ, the Ministry of Defence admitted responsibility for the deaths of the 14 servicemen aboard Nimrod aircraft XV230, after two families brought a landmark legal action using human rights law. High Court papers submitted by the MoD in response to the claim accept for the first time that the Nimrod was "not airworthy". The papers added: "The defendant owed to the deceased a duty of care and the accident was caused by this breach of that duty of care."
