= Stephen Thomas (naval officer) =

British royal Navy aviator (born 1961)

Stephen Harrison Thomas
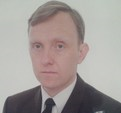
- Steve Thomas
- Born: Stephen Thomas; 1961 (age 64–65); Yorkshire, United Kingdom
- Military career
- Allegiance: United Kingdom
- Branch: Royal Navy
- Service years: 1978–1989
- Rank: Lieutenant-Commander
- Nickname: "Frodo"
- Unit: Fleet Air Arm
- Conflicts: Falklands War
- Awards: Distinguished Service Cross

Stephen Harrison Thomas (born 1961) known during his naval service as Steve Thomas is a former Royal Navy Fleet Air Arm officer and Sea Harrier pilot who served with 801 Naval Air Squadron during the Falklands War.

During the conflict, he flew over fifty operational sorties in the air defence role from HMS Invincible and was awarded the Distinguished Service Cross for gallantry. His service is described in published accounts of the Falklands air war, including works by Nigel Ward and other historians, in connection with air combat engagements against Argentine aircraft.

The role of Sea Harrier pilots, including Thomas, has been identified in historical studies as a key factor in establishing British air superiority during the conflict despite numerical and technical disadvantages.

== Early life ==
Thomas was born in Yorkshire in 1961. In May 1978, he underwent various tests and examinations at the Aircrew Selection Centre, at RAF Biggin Hill, along with further tests and interviews at HMS Daedalus, and interviews at the Admiralty Interview Board, HMS Sultan. He joined Britannia Royal Naval College, Dartmouth in October 1978 as an officer under training with the rank of Midshipman.

== Military career ==
After basic flying training, he completed advanced instruction with the Fleet Air Arm on the Bae Hawk at RAF Valley, followed by conversion to the two-seat Harrier T4. He graduated from the Operational Flying Training Unit, 899 Naval Air Squadron, before joining 801 NAS under the command of Lieutenant-Commander Nigel "Sharkey" Ward. He subsequently flew the Sea Harrier FRS1 from HMS Invincible.

December 1981 Detachment to Decimomannu

Thomas, as a newly commissioned pilot with 801 Naval Air Squadron, participated in a deployment to the Air Combat Manoeuvring Installation (ACMI) at Decimomannu, Cagliari, Sardinia, under the command of Lieutenant-Commander Nigel “Sharkey” Ward. The detachment involved tri-national fighter combat training exercises against U.S. Air Force F-15 “Bitburg Eagles” and U.S. Navy Aggressor F-5Es. Despite the technical superiority of the opposing aircraft, the Sea Harrier pilots, including Thomas, achieved notable success through disciplined handling and strategic acumen.

=== Falklands war ===
Thomas embarked on Invincible on 3 April 1982 for the journey South.

Engagement on 1 May 1982

Lieutenant Steve Thomas and Flight Lieutenant Paul Barton were on a Combat Air Patrol West of Invincible over West Falkland, at approximately 35,000 ft, when they were vectored toward two Argentine Mirage IIIEA fighters to the North. Barton engaged, launching an AIM‑9L Sidewinder which destroyed the rearmost Mirage. The pilot, Lt Rubén Perona, ejected safely. This was the first British air‑to‑air kill since the Korean War.

Thomas fired a Sidewinder at the second Mirage just as it disappeared into cloud, but the missile failed to detonate. The missile was reported to have damaged the aircraft however and because of this, the pilot, Capt Gustavo Cuerva, now also low on fuel, flew to Stanley, but was shot down and killed by Argentine anti‑aircraft defences while attempting to land. Thomas was credited with the kill.

21 May 1982

Lieutenant-Commander Ward, was leading a division of three aircraft on a Combat Air Patrol, Southwest of San Carlos Water with Steve Thomas and Alisdair Craig. Two Pucaras operating from Goose Green were detected by HMS Brilliant and the Harriers were vectored to intercept. One of the Pucaras was attacked from abeam by Thomas and Craig without being hit. Simultaneously, Ward attacked the second flown by Major Carlos Tomba from behind with his cannon, and shot it down. Tomba ejected from the Pucara at very low-level and walked back to Goose Green.

Later that day, Thomas as Wards wingman, were flying a low-level combat air patrol west of San Carlos. Ward spotted two Argentine Air Force Mirage V "Daggers" approaching at low level heading towards the landing beaches around San Carlos. Ward flew head-on between them, forcing them to turn away. This brought them directly in front of Thomas, who shot down both aircraft with Sidewinder missiles. A third Dagger, approaching from behind, fired on Ward but missed, Ward then turned and destroyed it with a Sidewinder. All three Argentine pilots; Major Piuma, Captain Donadille, and Lieutenant Senn, ejected safely. A fourth Dagger evaded interception and attacked Brilliant, causing minor damage.

On the flight back to Invincible Thomas went on to say

As we reached Port Howard we went on either side of the settlement, to avoid the Argentine troop positions there but I must have flown over one of the outlying machine gun post because suddenly I saw orange flashes coming past me. A split second later there was the sound of a ‘thump’ on the radio, one of my fuel pumps failed and both of my radios were out. When I reached the carrier, I went into the hover and there was the FDO in his yellow jacket pointing at the spot on which I was to land. After I landed, I found the aircraft had been hit in the avionics compartment at the rear by three 0.50 Cal rounds. Two had gone clean through the fuselage and come out the top and one had lodged in the TACAN control box. From the direction in which the bullets hit, the enemy machine gun must have been almost exactly underneath me.

Goose Green

The Battle of Goose Green was fought from 28 to 29 May 1982 on East Falkland’s central isthmus, the site of a tactically important airfield. On 29 May, the 2nd Battalion, Parachute Regiment (2 Para) were pinned down by well-positioned 35mm anti-aircraft guns, preventing further movement and causing casualties.

Three Sea Harriers, Lieutenant Nigel "Sharkey" Ward (XZ451), Lieutenant Steve Thomas (XZ453), and Flight Lieutenant Ian Mortimer (XZ459), each armed with either 2.75-inch FFAR rockets or cluster bombs, strafed the Argentine gun positions.

Second Lieutenant Claudio Braghini, Commander of the Argentine 35mm AA guns, recalled:

We had not yet finished taking cover when a Harrier emerged from between the hills and dropped a bomb on the gun position, but with such poor aim that half of the cluster fell in the water and the rest about 80 metres from the guns.

Corporal John Geddes of Patrols Platoon, 2Para, later wrote:

The cluster bombs the Harriers had been carrying killed fish as they exploded in the sea.

The Sea Harriers, however, made much more of an impact, at least psychologically. As one of the British company commanders put it: ‘They frightened me shitless, never mind the Argentinians’. Some people have seen the Harrier strike as the decisive action of the battle. The cluster bombs and rockets made a lot of noise, but did little collateral damage - they just moved a lot of mud sideways, as another of the pilots put it. Nevertheless, coming at a time when the Argentinians had their backs to the wall having just withdrawn into Goose Green, it seems reasonable to agree with the British battlegroup commander Chris Keeble, that the Harriers finally cracked the Argentinians’ will to fight.

1 June

On 1 June 1982, Steve Thomas and Ward were in the climb returning to Invincible after combat air patrol when they were alerted by HMS Minerva (F45) to a radar contact 40 miles to the Northwest. The pair turned towards the position and acquired a target using their Blue Fox radar at a range of 38 miles and an altitude of 4,000 feet below their position. The target, a four-engine Lockheed C-130 Hercules, was heading West towards Argentina while descending. As the Harriers closed, Ward visually identified the aircraft and engaged immediately. His first missile missed, but the second struck between the starboard engines. He then fired 240 rounds from his aircraft's cannons, causing the Hercules to crash into the sea, killing all seven crew members.

== Summary ==
Thomas flew over fifty operational missions during the Falklands War in the air defence role from HMS Invincible. He was involved in multiple air combat engagements against Argentine aircraft and is credited in published accounts with several air-to-air victories, as well as participation in a number of additional engagements during the conflict.

Some accounts credit Thomas with three fast-jet victories during the conflict, although individual combat claims in the Falklands air war have been subject to differing interpretations in the literature.

At the time of the conflict, he was among the less experienced Sea Harrier pilots in operational service, having relatively limited flying hours on the type. Despite this, he took part in several significant engagements described in historical accounts of the air campaign.

For his actions during the campaign, he was awarded the Distinguished Service Cross for gallantry.

== After the Falklands War ==
Thomas subsequently served at the Aeroplane and Armament Experimental Establishment (AAEE), Boscombe Down as a test pilot until 1988, working on Upgrade of FRS1 to the F/A 2, featuring the Blue Vixen pulse-doppler radar and the AIM-120 AMRAAM missile as well as the Air-to-Air Refueling (AAR) Probe. These trials and tests were critical in developing and refining new aircraft and weapon systems and improving the capabilities of existing ones. The AAEE at Boscombe Down played a vital role in ensuring the effectiveness and safety of British military aviation during this period.

== Later life ==
Stephen retired from the Royal Navy in 1989 with the rank of Lieutenant-Commander. He embarked on a civilian aviation career, starting as a First Officer and then becoming Captain at Air UK, a regional airline. He flew the BAe 146 Regional Jetliner on European routes from Manchester and later operated Boeing 737-400 for Air UK Leisure from Luton Airport. After KLM bought Air UK, he moved to the Netherlands and served as a Captain on Boeing 767-300 ER on South American routes.

== Reception and historical significance ==
The role of Fleet Air Arm Sea Harrier pilots during the Falklands War has been widely discussed in historical analyses of the conflict, particularly in relation to the establishment of British air superiority despite numerical and technical disadvantages. Lawrence Freedman, in The Official History of the Falklands Campaign, emphasises the decisive contribution of Sea Harrier operations in protecting the Task Force and countering Argentine air attacks.

Within this context, Thomas's operational service forms part of a body of documented air combat engagements described in multiple secondary sources. Accounts of the air war, including Nigel Ward's Sea Harrier Over the Falklands and the British Aviation Research Group's Falklands: The Air War, describe engagements in which Sea Harrier pilots, including Thomas, were involved in interceptions against Mirage and Dagger aircraft during key phases of the conflict.

Historians and aviation writers have noted that these engagements were often conducted under demanding conditions, including low-level operations, limited radar coverage, and fuel constraints, placing significant emphasis on pilot skill and tactical coordination. The performance of Sea Harrier pilots in such circumstances has been cited as a critical factor in limiting Argentine air effectiveness over the islands.

Thomas's award of the Distinguished Service Cross further reflects contemporary recognition of his operational performance. The official citation highlights his participation in multiple engagements, his effectiveness in air combat, and his ability to recover safely under adverse conditions, including damage to his aircraft and loss of communications.

While individual combat claims in the Falklands air war have been subject to varying interpretations in different sources, Thomas is consistently associated with several air combat engagements described in published accounts of the campaign, placing his service within the broader operational narrative of the conflict.

Thomas's subsequent service as a test pilot at the Aeroplane and Armament Experimental Establishment (AAEE), Boscombe Down, has also been noted in the context of post-war development of the Sea Harrier, including work associated with upgrades to later variants.

== Honours and awards ==
- 8 October 1982 – Distinguished Service Cross for gallant and distinguished service in the South Atlantic:

Lieutenant Thomas, (801 NAS), a first tour pilot, flew 50 combat sorties and was involved in four separate actions against the Argentine Air Force. In each of these he acquitted himself exceptionally well showing disregard for his own safety. During these actions, one aircraft was destroyed by Lieutenant Thomas. On one occasion he and his partner were attacked by three Mirages firing missiles, but they turned the tables by shooting down two and damaging the third. On a second occasion, his aircraft was hit by anti-aircraft fire and communications lost, despite which he recovered safely to the ship. In two of the actions he was left with barely sufficient fuel but returned safely to the ship 150 miles away with professional skill and calmness. In each of the actions his excellent radar handling and teamwork were decisive factors. This young aviator displayed enormous courage, determination, good judgment and aggression in the face of the enemy.

— The London Gazette, 8 October 1982
- 1982 – South Atlantic Medal with rosette for service during the Falklands War.
