= Ian Allan (RAF officer) =

- Born: 6 May 1918; Cathcart, Scotland
- Died: 9 July 1988 (aged 70)
- Military career
- Allegiance: United Kingdom
- Branch: Royal Air Force
- Service years: 1938–1973
- Rank: Air Commodore
- Commands: Officer and Aircrew Selection Centre; RAF Leeming; No. 29 Squadron RAF
- Conflicts: Second World War: Battle of Britain; North African Campaign; North West Europe Campaign
- Awards: Companion of the Distinguished Service Order; Distinguished Flying Cross; Air Force Cross; Mentioned in Despatches

Air Commodore John Watson Allan, DSO, DFC, AFC (6 May 1918 – 9 July 1988), known as Ian Allan, was a Scottish Royal Air Force officer and flying ace of the Second World War, who was credited with 14 kills.

Allan was born in Cathcart, Scotland. He joined the Royal Air Force Volunteer Reserve in 1938, and qualified as a pilot in October 1940, serving with No. 266 Squadron RAF during the Battle of Britain. On 20 January 1941 he received a commission in the RAFVR. In 1942 he joined No. 256 Squadron RAF as a night pilot operating Boulton Paul Defiants. Allan was promoted to Flight Officer on 20 January 1943, with seniority of 14 January 1943. In July 1943 Allan led a detachment of his squadron to Malta. Between 12 July and 31 August 1943, with the assistance of his observer, Flight Lieutenant Harold James Davidson, he was credited with 14 enemy aircraft destroyed, with five being brought down on the night of 15/16 July and two each on 16/17 July and 25/26 July. He and Davidson were awarded the Distinguished Flying Cross in recognition of their aerial victories on 31 August 1943. The citation, published in The London Gazette, read:

As observer and pilot respectively, these officers have displayed rare skill in night operations. In two recent nights they have destroyed 3 enemy aircraft, bringing their victories to 13, all of which have been obtained in July, 1943. Their record is outstanding and worthy of the highest praise.

— Citation for Distinguished Flying Cross, London Gazette, 31 August 1943.

At the beginning of 1944 Allan joined No. 151 Squadron RAF and undertook night ranger operations over Northern Europe, before moving to No. 29 Squadron RAF. In December 1944 he became commanding officer of No. 29 Squadron, which operated de Havilland Mosquitos, and he remained with the unit for the rest of the war. On 1 January 1945 he was mentioned in despatches. He was promoted to the permanent rank of squadron leader on 1 September 1945. In December 1945 Allan became a staff officer.

In 1950 he took command of the all-weather fighter wing at RAF Coltishall and in 1953 he led a flight of de Havilland Vampires during the Coronation Review flypast. He was promoted to wing commander on 1 July 1952. In March 1954 he served as an Administration Staff Officer at RAF Fighter Command, before becoming Officer Commanding Administration Wing, No. 3 Flying Training School RAF. He was awarded the Air Force Cross (United Kingdom) on 10 June 1954. On 14 September 1959 he took up the role of officer commanding, Administration Wing at RAF Northolt. Between 1960 and 1966 he worked at the Joint Warfare Establishment, before becoming officer commanding, RAF Leeming on 16 September 1966. On 1 June 1971 Allan assumed his final posting as the commandant of the Officer and Aircrew Selection Centre. He had been promoted to air commodore on 1 July 1967, and retired from the RAF on 6 May 1973.
