= No. 130 Squadron RAF =

Defunct flying squadron of the Royal Air Force

No. 130 (Punjab) Squadron RAF
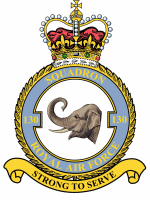
- Squadron badge
- Active: 1 Mar 1918 – 4 July 1918; 16 June 1941 – 13 February 1944; 5 April 1944 – 31 January 1947; 1 August 1953 – 31 May 1957; 1 December 1959 – 23 August 1963
- Country: United Kingdom
- Branch: Royal Air Force
- Nickname: Punjab
- Motto: Strong to serve

Insignia
- Squadron Badge heraldry: An elephant's head couped. Elephants are formidable opponents and are associated with the Punjab.
- Identification symbol: PJ 1941 - Feb 1944; AP Apr 1944 - 1947

No. 130 Squadron of the Royal Air Force was a Second World War and Cold War fighter squadron, and later a strategic missile squadron.

== History ==
The squadron was first formed on 1 March 1918 as part of the Royal Flying Corps. Based at RAF Wyton it soon moved to RAF Hucknall as a training unit to convert pilots and observers on to the Airco DH.9. With enough crews available for duties in France the squadron was disbanded on 4 July 1918.

The squadron was formed again on 16 June 1941, as No. 130 (Punjab) Squadron following a donation of a squadron of Supermarine Spitfires by the state of Punjab.

Based at Portreath it operated shipping patrols in the south west approaches to England. With the long summer nights it soon became active on fighter sweeps over northern France, it would fly to bases in the south-east of England in the morning to carry out operations and return to Cornwall at night. When winter approached it returned to coastal patrols until March 1943 when it moved North to Scotland. Having rested it was soon moved back to RAF West Malling in Kent to resume operations over France, this only lasted a month and it was moved North again as it lacked experienced pilots. It was disbanded on 13 February 1944 at RAF Scorton.

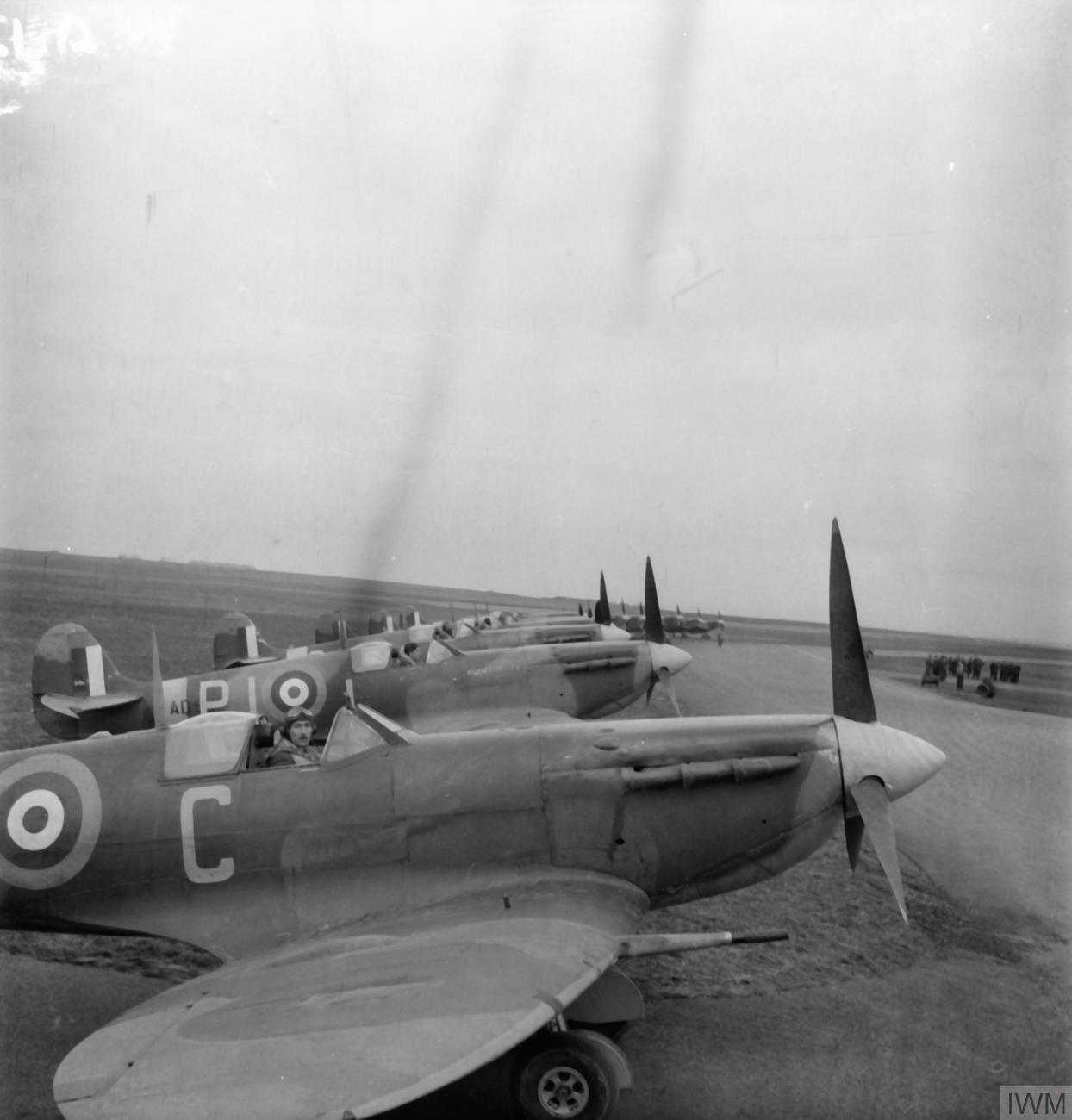
Supermarine Spitfire Mark VBs of No 130 Squadron RAF, lined up at Perranporth, Cornwall

To maintain the tradition of a Punjab squadron 186 Squadron at RAF Lympne was re-numbered as No. 130 (Punjab) on 5 April 1944. As before, the squadron was equipped with Spitfires. It operated daily bomber escort sorties and, being close to the English Channel, also took on a role in air-sea rescue, both searching for survivors and escorting rescue aircraft.

For Operation Overlord (the Allied invasion of Normandy in June 1944) the squadron was equipped with the Spitfire V LF operating from a temporary airfield at Horne, Surrey as part of Air Defence of Great Britain, though under the operational control of RAF Second Tactical Air Force. It provided cover for the Normandy beaches and shipping using the Mulberry harbours.

In August 1944 the squadron moved to RAF Tangmere and re-equipped with the more powerful Griffon-engined Spitfire XIV. The new Spitfires used the increased performance to operate Diver sorties: the interception of V-1 flying bombs. As the war progressed in mainland Europe the squadron started to operate ground-attack sorties over France and in October moved to Belgium to carry on the same role. It returned to England in May 1945.

After it moved to RAF Odiham in 1946 it became part of one of the first Wings to operate the de Havilland Vampire jet fighter. On 31 January 1947 the squadron was disbanded when it was re-numbered as 72 Squadron.

In 1953 the squadron was formed again with Vampires as part of the British forces in Germany to give air defence cover to the British sector equipped with the North American Sabre. The Sabres were an interim equipment until it could equip with the new Hawker Hunter fighter in 1956. The squadron was disbanded at RAF Bruggen on 30 April 1957.

The squadron reformed for the last time on 1 December 1959 at RAF Polebrook as one of 20 Strategic Missile (SM) squadrons associated with Project Emily. The squadron was equipped with three Thor Intermediate range ballistic missiles.

In October 1962, during the Cuban Missile Crisis, the squadron was kept at full readiness, with the missiles aimed at strategic targets in the USSR. The squadron was disbanded with the termination of the Thor Program in the United Kingdom in August 1963.

== Aircraft operated ==
From	To	Aircraft	Version
1918	1918	Airco DH.9	
1941	1941	Supermarine Spitfire	IIA
1941	1944	Supermarine Spitfire	VA and VB
1944	1945	Supermarine Spitfire	XIV
1945	1946	Supermarine Spitfire	IX
1946	1947	de Havilland Vampire	F1
1953	1956	North American Sabre	F4
1956	1957	Hawker Hunter	F4
1959	1963	Thor IRBM	
