= HMS Sultan (1956 shore establishment) =

Stone frigate training establishment of the Royal Navy

HMS Sultan HMS Siskin RAF Gosport
- Gosport, Hampshire in England
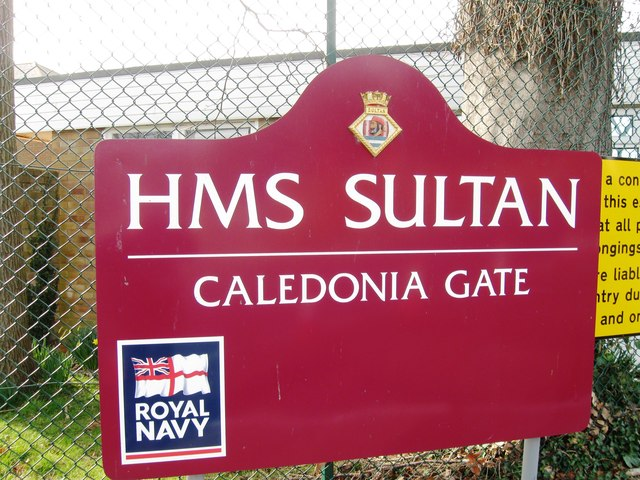
- Caledonia Gate to HMS Sultan

Site information
- Type: Stone frigate
- Owner: Ministry of Defence
- Operator: Royal Navy
- Open to the public: No
- Website: Official website

Location
- Shown within Hampshire
- Coordinates: 50°48′10″N 001°09′39″W

Site history
- Built: 1914
- In use: 1914–1945 (as RAF Gosport); 1945–1956 (as HMS Siskin); 1956–present (as HMS Sultan)

Garrison information
- Current commander: Captain Mark Hamilton

Airfield information
- Elevation: 7 metres (23 ft) AMSL

HMS Sultan is a stone frigate of the Royal Navy in Gosport, Hampshire, England. It is the primary engineering training establishment for the Royal Navy and home to the Network Rail Advanced Apprenticeship Scheme and the EDF Energy engineering maintenance apprenticeship.

The site was originally RAF Gosport it was then transferred to the Royal Navy during 1945 as Royal Naval Air Station Sultan (HMS Siskin) (Hence a nearby school being named Siskin School) it was then renamed HMS Sultan on 1 June 1956 when the airfield side was closed down and a Mechanical Repair Establishment was moved here from the Flathouse area by Portsmouth Dockyard.

The site was also home to HMS Centurion between 1970 and 1994, as a drafting depot and a pay and accounting centre.

== History ==
=== First World War ===
==== Fort Grange ====
- No. 1 Squadron RNAS formed on 17 October 1914, moving to France on 28 February 1915
- No. 5 Squadron Royal Flying Corps (RFC) between 6 July and 14 August 1914 with the Sopwith Tabloid, Royal Aircraft Factory B.E.1, Sopwith Three-seater and Farman MF.7 Longhorn
- No. 8 Squadron RFC between 6 January and 15 April 1915 with the Royal Aircraft Factory B.E.2C, B.E.2A and B.E.2B
- No. 13 Squadron RFC formed here on 10 January and moved to St-Omer on 19 October 1915, it used the B.E.2C and Bristol Scout
- No. 14 Squadron RFC between 5 August and 7 November 1915 with the Longhorn, BE2C and Caudron G.3
- No. 17 Squadron RFC reformed here on 1 February 1915 with the BE2C. It moved to Hounslow on 5 August 1915
- No. 23 Squadron RFC formed here on 1 September 1915 and used a variety of aircraft until 15 March 1916 when it moved to St-Omer
- No. 28 Squadron RFC formed here on 7 November 1915 with a variety of aircraft until 23 July 1917 when it moved to Yatesbury
- No. 29 Squadron RFC formed here on 7 November 1915 with a variety of aircraft. It moved to St-Omer on 25 March 1916
- No. 40 Squadron RFC formed here on 26 February 1916 with the B.E.2C and Avro 504 until 19 August 1916 when the unit moved to St-Omer
- No. 45 Squadron RFC formed here on 1 March 1916 with a variety of aircraft including the Martinsyde S.1 and Avro 504, staying until 3 May 1916 when it moved to Thetford

Units

- No. 1 Reserve Squadron arrived on 7 April 1916 at part of 7th Wing RFC. The Squadron was disbanded into the School of Special Flying, Gosport
- Southwestern Area Flying Instructors School was formed here on 1 July 1918 within No. 8 Group from part of No. 1 SoSF. The school was transferred to HQ RAF Gosport on 23 October 1918 and disbanded here on 26 February 1919

==== Fort Rowner ====
- No. 22 Squadron RFC formed here on 1 September 1915 with a variety of aircraft, it moved to St-Omer on 1 April 1916
- No. 41 Squadron RFC formed here initially on 15 April 1916 before disbanding on 22 May 1916. The unit reformed here again on 14 July 1916 with the Vickers F.B.5, Airco DH.2 and Royal Aircraft Factory F.E.8. Staying until 15 October 1916 when the unit moved to St-Omer
- No. 56 Squadron RFC formed here on 8 June 1916 using a variety of aircraft until 14 July 1916 when it moved to London Colney

==== Gosport ====
- 'B' Flight of No. 31 Squadron RFC formed here on 18 January 1916, staying until 1 March 1916 when the unit moved to Risalpur
- A detachment of No. 39 Squadron RFC from 30 June 1916
- No. 60 Squadron RFC formed here on 15 May 1916 using the Morane-Saulnier H until 228 May 1916 when the unit moved to the St-Omer
- A detachment of No. 78 Squadron RFC from 25 December 1916
- No. 79 Squadron RFC formed here on 1 August 1917 using various aircraft until 8 August 1917 when the unit moved to Beaulieu
- No. 81 Squadron RFC formed here on 7 January 1917 using various aircraft until 15 January 1917 when the unit moved to Scampton
- No. 88 Squadron RFC formed here on 24 July 1917 using various aircraft until 2 August 1917 when the unit moved to Harling Road

Units

- No. 1 School of Special Flying from 18 May 1918 until 1 July 1918 when the unit became the Southwestern Area Flying Instructors School RAF
- 7th Wing RFC between 8 November 1915 and 1 May 1916; controlling Fort Grange (Gosport), Fort Rowner (Gosport), Shoreham and Brooklands.
- Anti-Aircraft Special Defence Flight formed here during October 1918 but was disbanded during December 1918 operating the Camel
- No. 10 Training Squadron within HQ RAF Gosport between 25 June 1918 and 23 February 1919
- 17th Wing RFC between 9 August 1916 and 2 August 1917 within Southern Group Command
- No. 27 Reserve Squadron was formed here within 6th Wing, became No. 27 Training Squadron while in 17th Wing, operational between 22 May 1916 and 2 August 1917 when it was absorbed by the School of Special Flying
- No. 55 Training Squadron between 23 July and 2 August 1917 within 28th Wing RFC. Disbanded into School of Special Flying
- No. 59 Reserve Squadron within 17th Wing between 1 February and 30 April 1917 with the DH.1, F.E.2 and F.E.2d
- No. 62 Reserve Squadron between 1 and 10 May 1917
- No. 70 Training Squadron between 20 December 1917 and 1 January 1918 within 17th Wing.
- No. 87 (Canadian) Reserve Squadron between 9 and 28 February 1917 with the JN4
- No. 91 (Canadian) Reserve Squadron between 15 March and 16 April 1917 with the JN3

=== Inter war years ===
- No. 3 Squadron RAF from 8 November 1922 with the Supermarine Walrus until being disbanded on 1 April 1923
- A detachment of No. 42 Squadron RAF from 11 March 1938
- No. 186 Squadron RAF from 17 February 1919 with the Cuckoo until 1 February 1920 when the unit was disbanded
- No. 210 Squadron RAF reformed here on 1 February 1920 with the Cuckoo until 1 April 1923 when the unit disbanded
- A detachment of No. 224 Squadron RAF from 17 January 1938 with the Avro Anson I

Units

- No. 1 Coast Artillery Co-operation Flight formed here on 14 December 1936 using the Hawker Hart, Hawker Osprey III and Fairey Seal until 1 June 1937 when the unit was disbanded and became No. 1 Coast Artillery Co-operation Unit. It was redesignated back to its old name on 18 May 1941 but reverted to the newer name on 12 January 1942
- No. 17 Group Communications Flight was formed here during August 1938
- The Coastal Defence Development Unit was formed here on 1 April 1935 and was disbanded on 14 December 1936
- The Coast Defence Training Flight was disbanded here on 1 August 1933 to become No. 1 Coastal Defence Training Unit
- The Coastal Battery Co-operation Flight was formed here on 23 December 1919 and was disbanded here during September 1921
- The Coastal Battery Co-operation School Flight was formed here during September 1919 and disbanded here on 23 December 1919 to become the Coastal Battery Co-operation Flight
- The Development Squadron, Gosport was formed here on 17 August 1918 and disbanded on 31 December 1918. It was merged with elements from No. 185 Squadron RAF to become No. 186 (Development) Squadron
- The Eagle Trials Flight was formed here on 1 April 1920 and was disbanded during October 1920
- The School of Aerial Co-operation with Coastal Defence Batteries was formed here on 31 January 1918 and was disbanded during September 1919 to become the Coastal Battery Co-operation School
- The Torpedo Development Flight was formed here during 1925 and disbanded during November 1938 to become the Torpedo Development Section
- The Torpedo Development Section (1938–39) became the Torpedo Development Unit
- The Torpedo Development Unit RAF was formed here on 22 June 1939 and disbanded on 15 September 1943 to become the Aircraft Torpedo Development Unit
- The Torpedo Training Squadron
- The Torpedo Training Unit RAF was formed here during February 1936
- Royal Air Force Base Gosport was formed here on 1 October 1921 and had five different flights:
  - 'A' (Army and Navy Co-operation) Flight
  - 'B' (Telegraphist and Air Gunner) Flight
  - 'C' (Deck Landing) Flight
  - 'D' (Torpedo Training) Flight
  - 'E' (Experimental) Flight
- No. 409 (Fleet Fighter) Flight formed here on 7 October 1932
- No. 420 (Fleet Spotter) Flight formed here on 1 April 1923
- No. 421 (Fleet Spotter) Flight formed here on 1 April 1923
- No. 422 (Fleet Spotter) Flight formed here on 1 April 1923
- No. 423 (Fleet Spotter) Flight formed here on 21 November 1923
- No. 445 (Fleet Reconnaissance) Flight disbanded here on 3 April 1933
- No. 446 (Fleet Reconnaissance) Flight disbanded here on 3 April 1933
- No. 450 (Fleet Spotter Reconnaissance) Flight disbanded here on 3 April 1933
- No. 460 (Fleet Torpedo) Flight was formed here on 1 April 1923
- No. 461 (Fleet Torpedo) Flight formed here on 1 April 1923
- No. 462 (Fleet Torpedo) Flight formed here on 31 May 1924
- No. 463 (Fleet Torpedo) Flight formed here on 1 September 1927
- No. 464 (Fleet Torpedo) Flight formed here on 1 September 1927
- No. 465 (Fleet Torpedo) Flight formed here on 20 March 1931
- No. 466 (Fleet Torpedo) Flight formed here on 31 March 1931
- No. 401 (Fleet Fighter) Flight
- No. 402 (Fleet Fighter) Flight
- No. 403 (Fleet Fighter) Flight
- No. 404 (Fleet Fighter) Flight
- No. 405 (Fleet Fighter) Flight
- No. 406 (Fleet Fighter) Flight
- No. 407 (Fleet Fighter) Flight
- No. 408 (Fleet Fighter) Flight
- No. 421A (Fleet Spotter) Flight
- No. 421B (Fleet Spotter) Flight
- No. 440 (Fleet Reconnaissance) Flight
- No. 441 (Fleet Reconnaissance) Flight
- No. 441 (Fleet Spotter Reconnaissance) Flight
- No. 442 (Fleet Reconnaissance) Flight
- No. 442 (Fleet Spotter Reconnaissance) Flight
- No. 443 (Fleet Reconnaissance) Flight
- No. 443 (Fleet Spotter Reconnaissance) Flight
- No. 443A (Fleet Reconnaissance) Flight
- No. 446 (Fleet Spotter Reconnaissance) Flight
- No. 447 (Fleet Spotter Reconnaissance) Flight
- No. 448 (Fleet Spotter Reconnaissance) Flight
- No. 449 (Fleet Spotter Reconnaissance) Flight

=== Second World War ===
- No. 48 Squadron RAF between 30 November 1942 and 23 December 1942 with the Lockheed Hudson V, III & VI
- No. 86 Squadron RAF reformed here on 6 December 1940 with the Bristol Blenheim IV. The unit moved to RAF Leuchars on 3 February 1941
- No. 248 Squadron RAF between 16 April and 22 May 1940 with the Bristol Blenheim IF & IVF
- No. 608 Squadron RAF between 27 August and 9 November 1942 with the Hudson V
- No. 667 Squadron RAF formed here on 1 December 1943 and used a variety of aircraft including Boulton Paul Defiants, Hawker Hurricanes, Fairey Barracudas, Airspeed Oxfords, Vultee Vengeances and Supermarine Spitfires until 20 December 1945 when the unit was disbanded
- No. 2758 Squadron RAF Regiment
- No. 2777 Squadron RAF Regiment
- No. 2822 Squadron RAF Regiment
- No. 2837 Squadron RAF Regiment
- 707 Naval Air Squadron between 14 August and 1 October 1945 when the squadron was disbanded
- 708 Naval Air Squadron between 15 January and 6 September 1945 with the Blackburn Firebrand and Supermarine Seafire
- 764 Naval Air Squadron reformed here on 19 February 1944 with the Barracuda II and Avenger II until 1 September 1945 when the squadron was disbanded
- 771 Naval Air Squadron between 12 and 14 September 1945 with Seafires

Units

- No. 17 (Training) Group RAF at Fort Grange between 24 February 1939 and 5 February 1942
- ‘H’ Flight of No. 1 Anti-Aircraft Co-operation Unit RAF
- No. 2 Anti-Aircraft Co-operation Unit RAF was disbanded here on 14 February 1943
- ‘A’ Flight of No. 2 Anti-Aircraft Co-operation Unit became No. 1622 (Anti-Aircraft Co-operation) Flight RAF
- ‘B’ Flight of No. 2 Anti-Aircraft Co-operation Unit
- ‘D’ Flight of No. 2 Anti-Aircraft Co-operation Unit
- No. 8 Anti-Aircraft Co-operation Unit RAF
- The Aircraft Torpedo Development Unit was formed here on 15 September 1943
- No. 3206 Servicing Commando
- No. 401 Air Stores Park
- The School of Air Sea Rescue RAF
- Fleet Air Arm Maintenance Unit

=== RNAS Gosport during the Cold War ===
- No. 163 Gliding School was disbanded here during May 1948
- 705 Naval Air Squadron reformed here on 7 May 1947 as the Helicopter Fleet Requirements Unit with Sikorsky Hoverfly, Saunders-Roe Skeeter 3, Westland Dragonfly, Hiller HT.1, Westland Whirlwind staying until 1 November 1955
- 706 Naval Air Squadron between 7 September and 30 October 1953 with the Hiller HT.1 and the Whirlwind HAS.2
- 720 Naval Air Squadron between 27 May 1948 and 5 January 1950 when the squadron disbanded with Anson I and Airspeed Oxford I
- 727 Naval Air Squadron between 23 April 1946 and 17 January 1950 with various aircraft including the North American Harvard and the Fairey Firefly
- 778 Naval Air Squadron between 9 August 1945 and 3 January 1946 with Supermarine Sea Otter's, Barracuda's and Seafires
- 799 Naval Air Squadron between 17 December 1945 and 23 April 1946 with various aircraft

=== Additional units posted here ===
- 800 Naval Air Squadron
- 801 Naval Air Squadron
- 802 Naval Air Squadron
- 803 Naval Air Squadron
- 807 Naval Air Squadron
- 809 Naval Air Squadron
- 810 Naval Air Squadron
- 811 Naval Air Squadron
- 812 Naval Air Squadron
- 813 Naval Air Squadron
- 820 Naval Air Squadron
- 821 Naval Air Squadron
- 822 Naval Air Squadron
- 823 Naval Air Squadron
- 824 Naval Air Squadron
- 825 Naval Air Squadron
- 833 Naval Air Squadron
- 845 Naval Air Squadron
- 848 Naval Air Squadron
- 882 Naval Air Squadron
- 887 Naval Air Squadron
- 892 Naval Air Squadron
- 894 Naval Air Squadron
- 1846 Naval Air Squadron
- 1850 Naval Air Squadron

== Current use ==
It is the primary engineering training establishment for the Royal Navy. It is also home to the Network Rail Advanced Apprenticeship Scheme and the EDF Energy engineering apprenticeship within the Babcock Engineering Academy.

It is home to:

- Royal Naval Air Engineering & Survival School
  - 760 Engineering Training Squadron
  - 764 Initial Training Squadron
- Marine Engineering Training Group (previously Defence School of Marine Engineering)
  - Training Support Organization
  - Marine Engineering Department
  - Craft Skills Group
- Nuclear Department is part of the Defence Academy of the United Kingdom and the Nuclear Technology Education Consortium (NTEC)
- Nuclear Systems Group
- Nuclear Faculty
- Admiralty Interview Board
- Marine Engineering Museum
- Airfield Museum

Cadets

HMS Sultan is home to a number of units of the Volunteer Cadet Corps:

- HMS Sultan Royal Naval Volunteer Cadet Corps
- Gosport Division Royal Marines Volunteer Cadet Corps
- Band of the Royal Marines Volunteer Cadet Corps Gosport

=== Cancelled closure ===
A Better Defence Estate, published in November 2016, indicated that the Ministry of Defence intended on disposing of HMS Sultan by 2026. It was proposed that Submarine Engineer Training would move to HM Naval Base Clyde in 2024, Mechanical Engineering Training to HMS Collingwood in 2025 and the Admiralty Interview Board to HM Naval Base Portsmouth in 2026. In March 2019, the Ministry of Defence announced that closure would be delayed to 2029 at the earliest.

However, in December 2022, the Ministry of Defence announced that the closure had been reversed and HMS Sultan was to remain open. An MOD spokesperson said: "We can confirm that we are retaining HMS Sultan for which we have an enduring requirement."

Command of HMS Sultan and the Defence School of Marine Engineering were transferred from the Defence College of Technical Training, under the Royal Air Force's No. 22 Group, to the Royal Navy in November 2024. On transfer to the navy, the school was renamed the Marine Engineering Training Group. The Royal Naval Air Engineering and Survival School, remained under the control of the college.

== See also ==
- List of Royal Navy shore establishments
