= Sharkey Ward =

Fleet Air Arm pilot (1943–2024)

Commander Sharkey Ward DSC AFC
- Born: Nigel David Ward; 22 September 1943; Medicine Hat, Alberta, Canada
- Died: 17 May 2024 (aged 80); Grenada
- Military career
- Allegiance: United Kingdom
- Branch: Royal Navy
- Service years: 1962–1985
- Rank: Commander
- Nickname: "Sharkey"
- Unit: Fleet Air Arm
- Commands: 700A Sea Harrier Intensive Flying Trials Unit, 899 Naval Air Squadron, 801 Naval Air Squadron
- Conflicts: Falklands War
- Awards: Distinguished Service Cross; Air Force Cross
- Website: Official website

Commander Nigel David "Sharkey" MacCartan-Ward, DSC, AFC (born Ward; 22 September 1943 – 17 May 2024) was an officer in the Royal Navy. He played a key role in the introduction of the Sea Harrier aircraft into operational service with the Fleet Air Arm and commanded 801 Naval Air Squadron during the Falklands War. The nickname "Sharkey" is traditionally given to Royal Navy personnel with the surname Ward, in reference to the Barbary corsair Jack Ward.

== Early life ==
Nigel David Ward was born on 22 September 1943 in Medicine Hat, Canada, where his father, John Ward, was serving as a squadron leader in the Royal Air Force (RAF). In 1944, he travelled to the United Kingdom with his mother and elder brother, a five-week sea voyage. As a child, he developed bronchiectasis and was hospitalised for a year at the age of five. His health reportedly improved following a three-year stay in Pakistan at RAF Mauripur, where his father was stationed.

Ward was educated as a boarder at Reading School, where he served as Head Boy and captained the school's rugby team. In 1959, he received an RAF Flying Scholarship and earned his private pilot licence flying a de Havilland Tiger Moth.

== Military career ==
In 1962, Ward entered the Britannia Royal Naval College as a naval cadet on the General List. He undertook basic flying training before completing his conversion to operational fast jets with the Fleet Air Arm, flying the Hawker Hunter and Sea Vixen.

In 1969, he was court-martialled for conducting a low-level flight over Devon and Cornwall that alarmed members of the public. He received a formal reprimand. In his later account of the Falklands War, Ward noted that some of his peers had regarded him as a "Maverick", though acknowledged as a highly capable pilot.

He subsequently joined 892 Naval Air Squadron, flying the F-4K Phantom from HMS Ark Royal, where he qualified as an instructor. He later served as a nuclear planning officer at NATO's Allied Forces Northern Europe.

In 1976, Ward was appointed as the naval staff officer responsible for overseeing the development of the Sea Harrier. By 1979, the aircraft was deemed ready to enter operational service, within budget and on schedule. That same year, he assumed command of the Sea Harrier FRS.1 Intensive Flying Trials Unit at 700 Naval Air Squadron.

Ward appeared on an episode of Pebble Mill at One in 1979, during which he landed a Sea Harrier in a sports field adjacent to the Pebble Mill Studios. The event led to him being referred to in the press as "Mr Sea Harrier". He was subsequently given command of 801 Naval Air Squadron, embarked on HMS Invincible, and was promoted to the rank of Commander.

=== Falklands War ===
As commanding officer of 801 Naval Air Squadron, Ward was responsible for preparing the Sea Harrier for operational deployment in the South Atlantic. Aircraft and personnel were supplemented with resources from the conversion unit, 899 Naval Air Squadron. With a total of eight aircraft, 801 Squadron embarked aboard HMS Invincible on 4 April 1982.

During the voyage south, Ward implemented an intensive training programme for the squadron's pilots. He placed particular emphasis on the use of the Ferranti Blue Fox radar, which had been largely dismissed by personnel in 800 Naval Air Squadron, who reportedly favoured visual detection methods over radar when searching for enemy aircraft or ships. Ward also ensured that 801 Squadron pilots qualified for night flying operations in the Sea Harrier.

==== 21 May 1982 ====
On 21 May 1982, Ward, flying Sea Harrier XZ451/006, led a formation of three aircraft on a combat air patrol over the Falkland Sound, to the south-west of San Carlos Water. Two Pucará ground-attack aircraft operating at low altitude from Goose Green were detected by the air-defence controller aboard HMS Brilliant (F90). While the Sea Harriers were climbing en route to HMS Invincible (R05), they were redirected to intercept the Pucarás.

One of the Argentine aircraft was engaged from the side by Lieutenants Stephen Thomas and Alisdair Craig, but evaded damage. Ward engaged the second aircraft, flown by Major Carlos Tomba, from behind using his ADEN cannon, damaging the port aileron and setting the starboard engine on fire. He conducted two further attack runs, striking the fuselage and port engine, and on his final pass, flying at approximately 10 feet above ground level destroyed the cockpit canopy and upper fuselage. Tomba successfully ejected at low altitude and survived uninjured, later returning to Goose Green.

Later the same day, Ward, flying Sea Harrier ZA175, and his wingman, Lieutenant Stephen Thomas, were conducting a low-level combat air patrol west of San Carlos, over land. During a turn, Ward observed two Argentine Air Force Mirage V "Daggers" approaching from the west at very low altitude. The aircraft were en route to attack British landing forces in San Carlos Water. Ward flew directly between the Daggers before turning to engage. The Argentine aircraft also turned sharply but did not continue towards their intended target. Instead, they disengaged and attempted to withdraw. This manoeuvre placed them ahead of Thomas, who shot down both with AIM-9L Sidewinder missiles.

A third Dagger, which had not initially been detected, approached from behind and opened fire on Ward’s aircraft with its cannon, without success. Ward turned to engage and destroyed the aircraft with a Sidewinder missile. During the engagement, a fourth Dagger evaded interception and attacked the air defence control ship HMS Brilliant (F90), inflicting minor damage. All three Argentine pilots, Major Piuma, Captain Donadille, and Lieutenant Senn, ejected and survived.

==== 29 May 1982 (Goose Green) ====
The Battle of Goose Green was fought from 28 to 29 May 1982 on East Falkland’s central isthmus, the site of a tactically important airfield. On 29 May, the 2nd Battalion, Parachute Regiment (2 Para) were pinned down by well-positioned 35mm anti-aircraft guns, preventing further movement and causing casualties.

Three Sea Harriers, Ward (XZ451), Lieutenant Steve Thomas (XZ453), and Flight Lieutenant Ian Mortimer (XZ459), each armed with either 2.75-inch FFAR rockets or cluster bombs, strafed the Argentine gun positions.

Second Lieutenant Claudio Braghini, Commander of the Argentine 35mm AA guns, recalled:

We had not yet finished taking cover when a Harrier emerged from between the hills and dropped a bomb on the gun position, but with such poor aim that half of the cluster fell in the water and the rest about 80 metres from the guns.

Corporal John Geddes of Patrols Platoon, 2Para, later wrote:

The cluster bombs the Harriers had been carrying killed fish as they exploded in the sea.

The attack was generally considered ineffective.

==== 1 June 1982 ====
On 1 June 1982, Ward, flying Sea Harrier XZ451, and Lieutenant Stephen Thomas were climbing to return to HMS Invincible (R05) following a combat air patrol when they were alerted by HMS Minerva (F45) to an intermittent radar contact approximately 40 miles to the northwest. Ward turned the formation towards the reported position and acquired a large aircraft target using his Blue Fox radar at a range of 38 miles and an altitude of 4,000 feet below their position.

The target, subsequently identified as a four-engined Lockheed C-130 Hercules transport aircraft, was heading west towards Argentina while descending. As the Sea Harriers closed in at high speed, Ward visually identified the aircraft through low cloud at around 200 feet above sea level. Due to low fuel levels, he engaged the target immediately. His first Sidewinder missile missed, but the second struck between the starboard engines, causing a fire. Ward then fired approximately 240 rounds from his aircraft's ADEN cannons, causing the Hercules to lose control and crash into the sea. All seven crew members were killed.

During the conflict, Ward flew over sixty operational sorties and was credited with three confirmed air-to-air victories. He took part in, or witnessed, a total of ten aerial engagements, and was regarded as the squadron's most experienced night-flying pilot. He was awarded the Distinguished Service Cross for gallantry.

== Later life ==
After retiring from the Royal Navy in 1985, Ward authored the book Sea Harrier Over the Falklands: A Maverick at War, which was first published in 1992.

In 2001, he returned to RNAS Yeovilton to fly alongside his son, Kris Ward, after the latter qualified to operate the Sea Harrier FA2. Kris Ward died on 15 November 2018 at the age of 45.

In 2011, while residing in Grenada, Ward participated in a radio interview with Ezequiel Martel, the son of the C-130 Hercules pilot shot down by Ward during the 1982 conflict.

Ward died from a suspected heart attack at his home in Grenada, on 17 May 2024, at the age of 80.

== Honours and awards ==
- - 12 June 1982 - Air Force Cross for services to VSTOL aviation in the Queen's Birthday Honours
- - 8 October 1982 - Distinguished Service Cross for gallant and distinguished service in the South Atlantic
- - 1982 - South Atlantic Medal with rosette for service during the Falklands War
- November 1982 - Freedom of the City of London

== Works ==
- Ward, Commander Sharkey (1992). Sea Harrier Over the Falklands: A Maverick at War. Leo Cooper. pp. 299 pages. ISBN 978-0-85052-305-8.
- Ward, Sharkey (2020). Her Majesty's Top Gun: and the Decline of the Royal Navy. Mill City Press. pp. 516 pages. ISBN 978-1-6312-9867-7.
- Ward, Commander Sharkey; Dr Anthony Wells (2024). How Strategic Airpower has Changed the World Order. Pen and Sword Books. pp. 192 pages. ISBN 978-1-0361-0656-0.
