= Aircraft Torpedo Development Unit =

- Active: 1939-1993
- Country: United Kingdom
- Branch: Royal Air Force; Ministry of Supply

The Aircraft Torpedo Development Unit is a former unit of the Royal Air Force and the Ministry of Aviation Supply which was operational between 1939 and 1993.

== History ==
The unit was originally formed during September 1939 at Gosport as the Torpedo Development Unit within No. 16 Group RAF. It was renamed to Aircraft Torpedo Development Unit on 11 November 1943 when it absorbed the Torpedo Experimental Establishment, Stokes Bay and moved to No. 19 Group RAF. The unit had detachments at RAF Leuchars and RNAS Crail (HMS Jackdaw) between April and August 1944 due to the invasion preparations on the south coast for the Normandy landings (D-Day), a new Special Torpedo Unit joined on 1 March 1945. The unit moved to RNAS Culdrose (HMS Seahawk) on 11 June 1956, and at some point moving to No. 61 Group RAF. Control passed to the Ministry of Supply on 31 August 1958. Controlled than passed to the Ministry of Aviation in 1959, the Ministry of Technology at some point then the short-lived Ministry of Aviation Supply in 1970. The unit was also operated by the Royal Navy at some point before being disbanded during 1993.

The unit possibly began as early as 1921 at Gosport as part of RAF Base Gosport as the Torpedo Development Flight which was renamed to the Torpedo Development Section.

The unit used an observation point near Porthkerris Point, The Lizard, Cornwall, along with a pier within Stokes Bay and a site at Helston, with a range near Falmouth.
