= Potential Regiment Officers course =

The Potential Regiment Officers Course (PROC) (Normally pronounced "Pee-Rock") is an assessment tool of the Royal Air Force (RAF) in the United Kingdom, for people wishing to become an Officer in the Royal Air Force Regiment. Currently the candidates, who as of September 2017 can be male or female, will already have passed the Officer and Aircrew Selection Centre. It has been in existence since April 2008, where it was previously known as the Potential Regiment Officers Acquaintance Course (PROAC). This name was changed due to confusion over whether the course was assessed or merely an introduction to the RAF Regiment.

Throughout the course all PROC candidates will be expected to lead from the front and display officer qualities relevant to the RAF Regiment Officer role. Candidate numbers can range from 1 to 5 and will adopt the name identified by the bib allocated to them for the duration of the course (Alpha, Bravo, Charlie, Delta or Echo). PROC can be undertaken a maximum of 2 times with a second unsuccessful attempt resulting in the candidate being involuntarily withdrawn from the RAF application process. The pass rate is circa 50%.

== Requirements ==
Successful attendance at the course is required of any person who plans to train as an officer in the RAF Regiment. A candidate will be at least 17 years and 6 months of age at entrance, will hold a British passport, will have a minimum of 5 GCSEs graded A-C and 2 A-levels, or will have achieved a certified comparable education.

== Content and location ==
PROC is a four-day assessment course, designed to complement the RAF's Officer and Aircrew Selection Centre, for men and women wishing to become an RAF Regiment Officer.

The course is held at RAF Honington, in Suffolk in East Anglia, England.

The course is designed to discover a candidate's leadership qualities and ability to provide continued command in stressful situations. One's ability to communicate effectively, and one's physical condition, are also assessed.

=== Fitness assessment ===
Consisting of:

- Timed 2 Kilometer run of 9:30 seconds
- Swimming: 4 lengths of a 25-metre pool, followed by treading water for 2 minutes (performed in succession, without touching the sides or bottom of the pool, a boiler suit is worn throughout the duration of the test)
- Mid thigh pull of 95KG
- Medicine ball throw (4kg at 3.1m)

All of these are carried out to a minimum required standard, failing any aspect will result in expulsion from the course. The swimming test is not included in this parameter as failing to complete it in full will require a candidate to attend extra swimming lessons in Phase 2 training.

=== Assault Course ===
The candidates traverse the RAF Regiment assault course as an initial introduction, and are invited to try the obstacles individually. After the candidates are familiar with the course, they are ordered the run the course, which begins and ends with a 100-metre sprint around evenly spaced barrels. Some candidates have difficulty getting over the nine-foot wall; to avoid this problem it is important that candidates practice over-grip pull ups. The assault course is not a pass/fail, however feedback will be provided to the assessing staff by the PTI's conducting the course regarding PROC candidates physical and leadership abilities.

=== Exercise First Look ===
This is the most arduous phase of the selection process and will be both physically and mentally challenging. The beginning of the exercise sees both PROC and PGSC candidates conduct "Battle PT" with no set time limit. Candidates will learn to leopard crawl and monkey crawl and must pay strict attention to the rules and stipulations set out by the staff, else face consequences in the form of grenade drills and sprinting to a rally point and back. PROC candidates are monitored throughout for both determination and leadership qualities and are directly scrutinized by the assessing staff. Following this the course will conduct casualty evacuation drills around the perimeter of the training area. Overall this aspect can take as long as 3 hours. Following this the course will be fed a hot meal and PROC candidates will be briefed on the overnight aspect of the exercise. The shelters used are abandoned shipping containers, prior to this candidates are supplied with bergans and sleeping equipment. The exercise lasts until 04:50 where the course will be transported back to the RAF Regiment Heritage Centre to hand back kit.

=== Interviews ===
The candidates will be interviewed by OC Regiment Recruitment flight. The interview consists of both motivations for joining, career outlook & Regiment history

Shortly after the interview they will be summoned for the tell, in which the Regiment officer will tell them what recommendation the RAF Regiment will be making with regards to their advancing to Initial Officer Training at RAF Cranwell. A report is written to the Officer & Aircrew Selection Centre with a final decision resting with the Centre.

== Typical Course Structure ==
=== Day 1 ===
- Pick up from Thetford and transit to RAF Honington
- Administration Briefing

=== Day 2 ===
- Opening Address
- RAF Regiment Heritage tour (trip to RAF Regiment museum and RAF Regiment field squadrons)
- Weapons Demonstration
- Fitness Assessments & Swim test

=== Day3 ===
- Assault Course
- Lectures
- Exercise 'First Look'

=== Day 4 ===
- Ex First Look (continued)
- Interviews
- Tell
- Course Dispersal
