= Admiralty Interview Board =

United Kingdom military jurisdictive body

Agency overview
- Formed: 1903
- Jurisdiction: Government of the United Kingdom
- Headquarters: HMS Sultan
- Agency executive: Board President
- Parent agency: Navy Command

The Admiralty Interview Board (AIB) is a key element of the officer selection process for the Royal Navy, Royal Marines, Royal Naval Reserve, Royal Marines Reserve, and Royal Fleet Auxiliary.

It is an equivalent of the Army Officer Selection Board and the Officer and Aircrew Selection Centre of the Royal Air Force and has roots in a process first introduced in 1903.

Formerly conducted as a two-day assessment process at HMS Sultan, the Board's operations moved online during the COVID-19 pandemic.

== Application process ==
Officer applicants for the Royal Navy undertake initial suitability testing and interviews at an Armed Forces Careers Office (AFCO). All applicants complete a common recruitment test (RT) with varying score thresholds depending on branch, before having a formal 'sift' interview. RM applicants must also complete and pass the potential officers course (POC). RFA applicants conduct all career discussions and their sift interview at Portsmouth, rather than their local AFCO.

Once initial suitability has been assessed and a preferred specialisation identified, the candidate will be loaded onto a board. Successful completion of the board is a precursor to possible selection as a candidate for training.

The board is not itself competitive, with candidates being scored on their performance. The score is then used to select candidates for initial officer training.

== Pre-2020 Board Format ==
The Board consisted of a range of academic, physical, mental and aptitude tests assessing suitability for future employment. Potential Officers for the Royal Marines would also be required to undertake a Potential Officers' Course at the Commando Training Centre Royal Marines (CTCRM) at Lympstone and Aircrew candidates would have taken Flying Aptitude Tests at RAF Cranwell prior to attending the AIB.

Each board was presided over by a Board President (a Captain or a Commander) who was assisted by a Lieutenant Commander and a Lieutenant (or their Royal Marine equivalents). Each board considered a syndicate of four candidates and up to three concurrent boards could be ongoing. Each Board was supported by a senior rating or senior NCO, responsible for the administration and briefing of candidates

=== Day one ===
Candidates arrived at around midday - the majority of day one was based around acquainting them with the assessments to be completed the following day, completing the fitness test, and providing an opportunity for the syndicates to bond as a team.

Candidates were presented with a sample Planning Exercise, a significantly simpler version of the exercise that they will complete subsequently. After being briefed on this they were conducted to the gymnasium where they will be briefed on the Practical Leadership Tasks; practical techniques, equipment familiarisation, and health and safety issues.

The day concluded with a fitness assessment, consisting of a 1.5 mile run. In addition to meeting the prescribed time requirements, candidates were required to show motivation and determination. The result of the run was not given until the final feedback session, and candidates had to meet the required times in order to be selected.

Finally, candidates had free time during the evening and were encourage to practice the techniques for the PLTs and bond with their syndicate in order to stand the best chance the following day.

=== Day two ===
The second day was assessed by the board president and staff through observation and interview.

The syndicate completed a leaderless exercise in the gym, before each candidate would lead a Practical Leadership Task. Syndicates attempted tasks selected from a range of scenarios: i.e. load carries across chasms or pools using supplied equipment.

The assessed planning exercise was undertaken under assessed conditions. The syndicate was given a short period to study the scenario, a problem is then introduced which must be overcome. Candidates discussed possible courses of action as a group, presenting a group plan to the Board. Each candidate was then questioned on the scenario and the group plan. After this each candidate typed up a brief of their own individual plan, and presented this on their own to the board.

The final tasks were the interview and undertook psychometric tests. Here, over a period of thirty minutes, candidates were interviewed about their past achievements, experiences of difficulty overcome, and questioned as to their motivations in joining the Naval Service. Interleaved with the interviews were assessments of abstract, numerical and verbal reasoning.

== Current format ==
Due to limitations imposed during the 2020 Covid-19 pandemic, the AIB process has moved to a virtual format. The first stage sifts candidates using eight asymmetric interview questions, with the candidate recording a two-minute answer to each question; if successful, small groups of candidates undertake a virtual leadership exercise conducted over a video conference call. Fitness is not assessed as an element of the AIB.

These arrangements remain in place as of Autumn 2025.

== Outcome ==
Where a candidate has passed they may be offered a position immediately, or further selection may take place based on those candidates with the best scores over a number of boards. Where a candidate has passed but has not been selected, they may be offered an alternative branch (should there be shortages), or they may be invited to reattend AIB after 12 months when there may be more vacancies.

Where a candidate has not achieved a pass they may be invited back again (usually after a period of at least 6 months) if the board president believes the individual has future potential, or they may be advised that they should not return.

In all cases, candidates may only take part in an AIB at most three times.

All successful RN and RFA candidates who have passed AIB, have been selected, and have accepted the offer of employment then attend initial officer training at Britannia Royal Naval College in Dartmouth; CTCRM Lympstone for successful RM candidates.

== Sources ==
- http://www.royalnavy.mod.uk/ The Admiralty Interview Board (AIB)
