= 899 Naval Air Squadron =

Inactive flying squadron of the Royal Navy's Fleet Air Arm

- Squadron badge
- Active: 1942–1945; 1955–1957; 1961–1972; 1980–2005
- Disbanded: 23 March 2005
- Country: United Kingdom
- Branch: Royal Navy
- Type: Single-seat fighter squadron
- Role: Carrier-based fighter squadron
- Part of: Fleet Air Arm
- Mottos: Strike and defend
- Aircraft: See Aircraft flown section for full list.
- Engagements: World War II: Operation Husky; Operation Avalanche; Operation Dragoon; Falkland Islands sovereignty dispute: Operation Corporate
- Battle honours: Sicily 1943; Salerno 1943; South France 1944; Aegean 1944; Falklands Islands 1982

Commanders
- Notable commanders: Lieutenant Commander N.D. Ward, RN

Insignia
- Squadron Badge Description: Blue, a base barry wavy of eight white and blue a chief five clouds white overall a gauntlet proper winged gold (1943)
- Identification Markings: 6A+ (Seafire); 2A+ (Seafire 1944); KA+ (Seafire on Khedive); CA+ (Seafire on Chaser); 485-496 (Sea Hawk); 485-494 (Sea Vixen); 121-137 (Sea Vixen January 1965); 100-106 (Sea Harrier/Hunter); 710-722 (Sea Harrier/Hunter July 1981)
- Fin Codes: J (Sea Hawk); VL (Sea Vixen); E (Sea Vixen January 1965); VL (Sea Harrier/Hunter)

899 Naval Air Squadron (899 NAS), also referred to as 899 Squadron, was a Fleet Air Arm (FAA) naval air squadron of the United Kingdom’s Royal Navy (RN). It most recently operated Sea Harrier at RNAS Yeovilton, in Somerset, as the Sea Harrier Headquarters Squadron for training and type conversion, between March 1980 and March 2005.

== History ==
=== Second World War ===
899 Naval Air Squadron was first formed on 15 December 1942 at RNAS Hatston using crew from 880 Naval Air Squadron and was equipped with the Supermarine Seafire IIC. The squadron embarked on the aircraft carrier Indomitable in March that year, continuing to work up until the carrier sailed for the Mediterranean Sea to take part in the Allied invasion of Sicily in July 1943. Indomitable formed part of the covering force protecting the landings from any intervention by Italian naval forces. Indomitable was damaged by German air attack on 16 July, and 899 Squadron disembarked at Gibraltar on 29 July as the carrier returned to Britain for repair. In August 1943, the squadron re-equipped with Seafire LIICs, which had better performance at low altitudes than its earlier aircraft, embarking on the escort carrier Hunter to take part in Operation Avalanche, the Allied landings at Salerno, Italy which took place from 9 September. Hunter formed part of Task Force V, consisting of five small carriers (Note: The escort carriers Hunter, Battler, Attacker and Stalker and the maintenance carrier Unicorn) that were tasked with providing fighter cover over the beachhead until airfields could be captured and brought into use. The squadron's Seafires proved effective in disrupting attacks by German fighter-bombers, although no German aircraft were shot down. Once an airstrip had been built ashore at Paestum on, five of the squadron's Seafires were operated from the airstrip until relieved by RAF Spitfires and USAAF P-40s on 15 September. Operation of Seafires from small escort carriers resulted in a large number of landing accidents, with a particular problem being propellers being damaged by the propeller blades hitting the flight deck on landing, causing Hunter's stock of spare propellers being exhausted. The squadron returned to Britain on 6 October 1943.

The squadron remained shore based in Northern Ireland for several months, temporarily receiving Spitfires in December owing to a shortage of Seafires, before re-equipping with Seafire LIIIs in March 1944. In April 1944 the squadron embarked on the escort carrier Khedive, and underwent an extensive programme of deck-landing and ground attack training. It disembarked to RAF Peterhead on 31 May, flying fighter patrols while Khedive underwent a period of defect repair, before re-embarking on the carrier on 6 July. On 15 July Khedive left for the Mediterranean to take part in Operation Dragoon, the Allied invasion of Southern France. The squadron helped to provide fighter cover for the invasion fleet and to carry out ground attack missions in support of the advancing Allied troops when the Dragoon landings started on 15 August. By the time Khedive was released from operations in support of Dragoon, on 23 August, 899 Squadron's Seafires had carried out 201 operation sorties for the loss of four aircraft, dropping 24 500 lb and 44 250 lb bombs. In September 1944, Khedive took part in Operation Outing, an offensive by the Royal Navy against German forces in the Aegean, with 899 Squadron flying combat air patrol and attack against surface targets in Crete and Rhodes from 14 to 19 September.

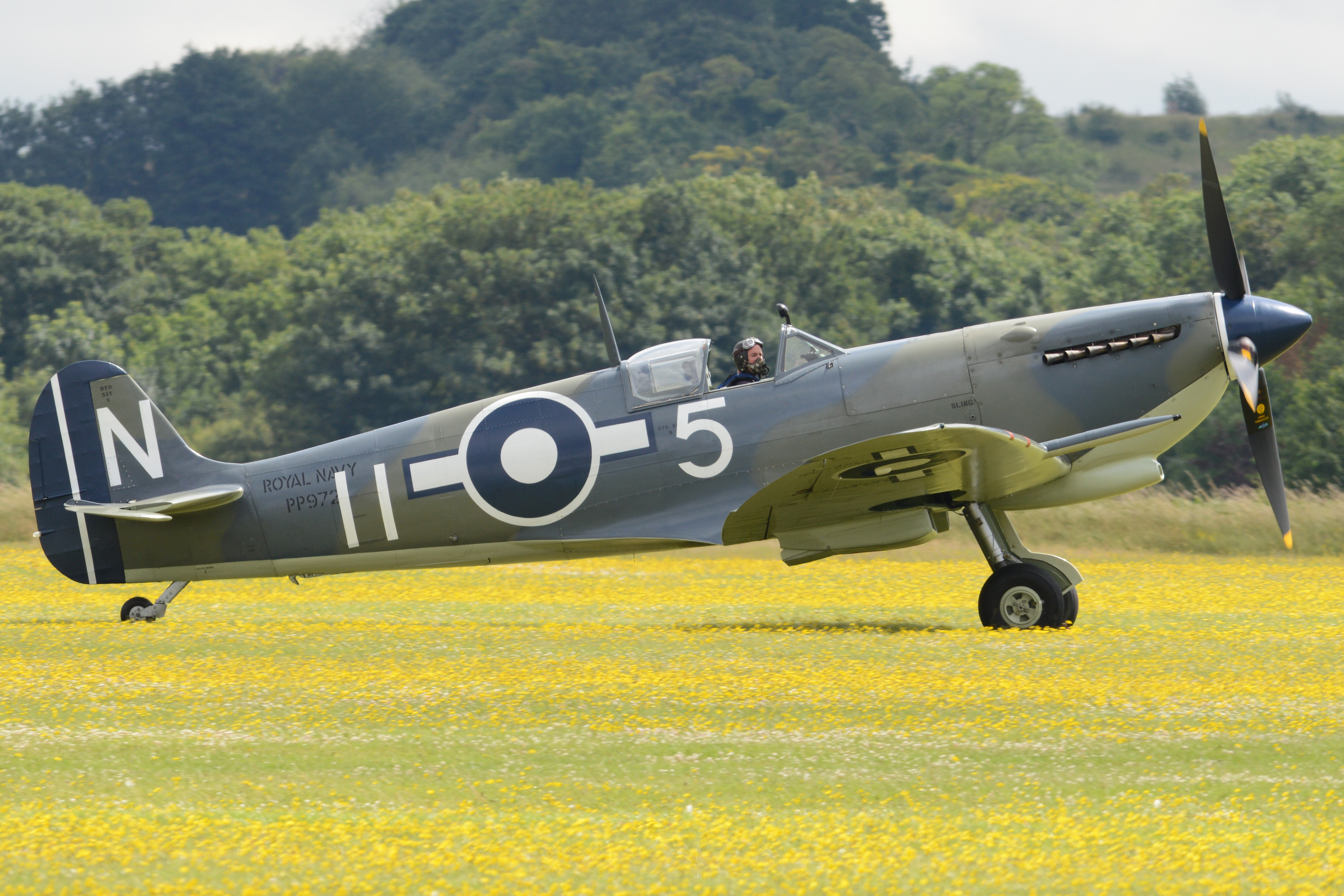
Supermarine Seafire L Mk.III; an example of the type used by 899 Squadron

The squadron disembarked from Khedive at RNAS Long Kesh on 12 October 1944. After a further period of training, the squadron embarked on the escort carrier Chaser for passage to join the British Pacific Fleet. On arrival in Australia, 899 Squadron became a pool squadron based at HMS Nabthorpe, situated at RAAF Station Schofields near Sydney, with its aircraft and pilots gradually dispatched to reinforce Seafire squadrons embarked on the British Pacific Fleet's operational Fleet carriers. From mid-May 1945, it was given the additional task of training pilots of the Royal Australian Naval Volunteer Reserve to fly Seafires from aircraft carriers. As the Australian pilots were all experienced Royal Australian Air Force pilots who had volunteered to join the Navy, the training process was relatively trouble free, with most of the pilots trained joining the carriers of the British Pacific Fleet after the end of the year, and several going on to have long careers with Australia's own Fleet Air Arm. It disbanded at Schofields on 27 September 1945. (Note: 18 September 1945 according to Sturtivant and Ballance.)

=== Cold War ===
==== Sea Hawk (1955–1957) ====
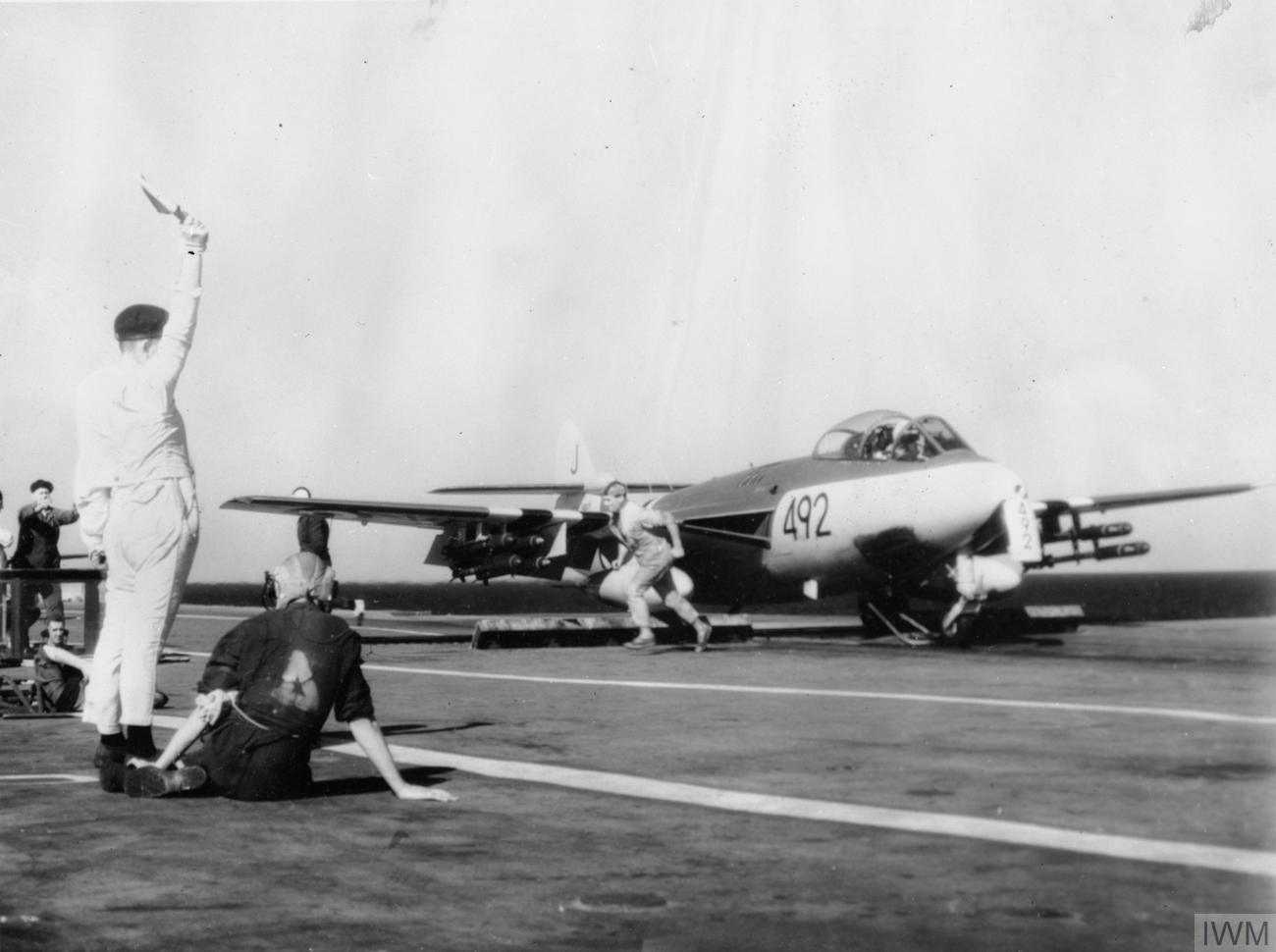
899 NAS Hawker Sea Hawk FGA.6 about to launch from HMS Eagle, 1956

On 7 November 1955, the squadron was recommissioned at RNAS Brawdy, equipped with 12 Hawker Sea Hawk FGA.6 jet fighters. After a five-month work up programme, including carrier landing training aboard Bulwark in January 1956, the squadron (together with 897 NAS, embarked aboard the carrier Eagle on 16 April 1956. The carrier then sailed to join the Mediterranean Fleet. The Egyptian nationalisation of the Suez Canal on 26 July 1956 caused the Suez Crisis, resulting in Operation Musketeer, the Anglo-French invasion of the Suez Canal zone. On 1 November, 899 Squadron carried out rocket attacks on Inchas and Cairo West airfields, continuing with ground attack missions until a ceasefire came into action on 7 September. The squadron flew 165 sorties without suffering any losses, although several of its aircraft received minor damage. Lieutenant Commander Arthur Bernard Bruce Clark, the commanding officer of 899 Squadron, was mentioned in despatches for his actions during the operation. After covering the Anglo-French evacuation from Egypt in December 1956, Eagle returned to Britain, with 899 Squadron disembarking to RNAS Brawdy on 3 January 1957 and disbanding there on 5 January.

==== Sea Vixen (1961–1972) ====
899 NAS reformed on 1 February 1961 at RNAS Yeovilton with the de Havilland Sea Vixen FAW.1 all weather fighter, as the Vixen Headquarters Squadron, tasked with evaluating equipment and tactics and equipped with five Sea Vixens. The unit participated in the 1961 Farnborough Airshow in September that year, and in the following year's show.

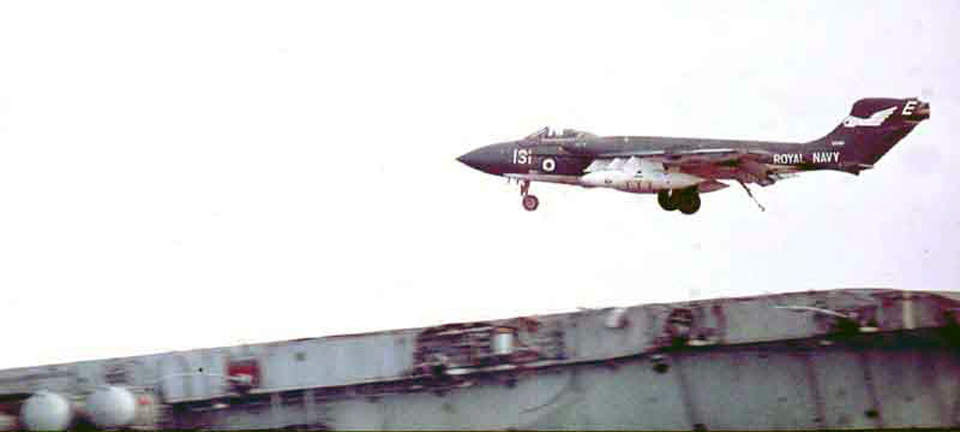
899 NAS de Havilland Sea Vixen landing on HMS Eagle, Mediterranean Jan 1970

In February 1964, the squadron began to convert to the Sea Vixen FAW.2, and after working out tactics and procedures for the new version, changed role to a fully operational squadron, with the squadron's strength increasing to 14 Sea Vixens. It embarked on the newly reconstructed Eagle in December that year, as the carrier sailed for the Far East. Eagle returned to Britain in May for a docking and maintenance period, with 899 re-embarking on 25 August 1965, as Eagle again left for the Far East. On 12 November 1965, Rhodesia (now Zimbabwe) made a Unilateral Declaration of Independence, and Eagle was ordered to stand by off the coast of Zambia in order to defend Zambia if hostilities with Rhodesia broke out. Eagle was relieved from this duty in December. In March 1966, Eagle relieved the carrier Ark Royal in providing air support to the Beira Patrol blockade aimed at enforcing a UN oil embargo against Rhodesia, remaining at sea for a record 72 days.

In 1967, with the disintegration of the Protectorate of South Arabia, HMS Eagle deployed to the Gulf of Aden. Throughout November 1967, 899 NAS flew reconnaissance flights over Aden with RAF Hawker Hunters of No. 43 Squadron. The squadron continually maintained a patrol of four Vixens over Aden to cover the withdrawal of British forces. On 29 November, four Sea Vixens of 899 NAS were the last British military aircraft to leave Aden, with one carrying the Union Jack back to HMS Eagle.

899 NAS was decommissioned on 23 January 1972.

=== Training squadron ===
==== Sea Harrier FRS1 (1980–1993) ====
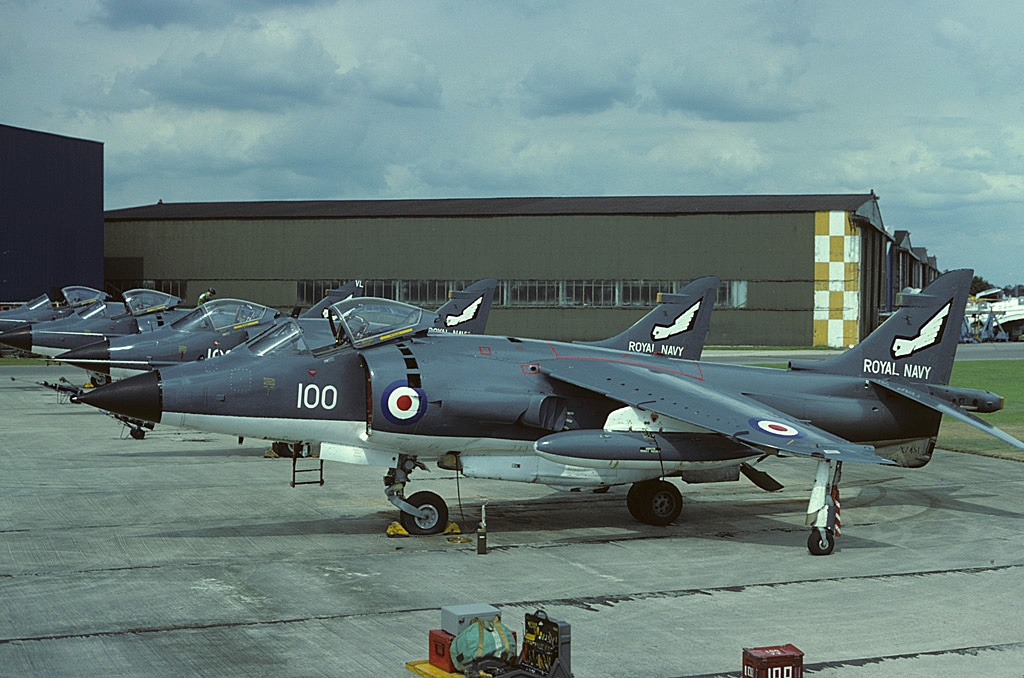
A line up of 899 Squadron British Aerospace Sea Harrier FRS.1 during the days of full colour markings.

899 NAS was recommissioned on 31 March 1980 with the British Aerospace Sea Harrier FRS.1, taking over from 700A Flight, the Sea Harrier Intensive Training Unit. It was the Sea Harrier Headquarters Squadron, converting pilots onto the Sea Harrier (they would first receive instruction on how to fly STOVL aircraft with the RAF's 233 Operational Conversion Unit where they would fly two seat Harrier T4 trainers), as well as carrying out continuing trials of the Sea Harrier. From August 1981, the squadron also received Hawker Hunter T.8M, fitted with the Sea Harrier's Ferranti Blue Fox radar.

In April 1982, Argentina invaded the Falkland Islands, resulting in the Falklands War. While 899 Squadron did not take part directly in the war, most of its personnel and aircraft joined 800 NAS (HMS Hermes) and 801 NAS (HMS Invincible) for service in the South Atlantic. From May 1982, the squadron recommenced training activities, using Sea Harriers borrowed from the Aeroplane and Armament Experimental Establishment to train pilots for 809 Naval Air Squadron, specially formed for the Falklands War. In early July, the squadron received 8 RAF Harrier GR.3s on loan to help train the air wing for the new carrier Illustrious, until the return of Hermes on 21 July provided sufficient Sea Harriers for the squadron to return to normal. In September 1983, it received its own two-seaters, three Harrier T4Ns, which were supplemented in 1987 by ex-RAF T4As, with the squadron taking full responsibility for the entire training task for Sea Harrier pilots in 1989.

==== Sea Harrier FA2 (1993–2005) ====
In June 1993 an Operational Evaluation Unit (OEU) for the British Aerospace Sea Harrier FA.2 was set up within the squadron, although the OEU operated out of Boscombe Down rather than Yeovilton, with the main squadron receiving FA.2s from September that year and beginning conversion training on the new mark in March 1994, continuing its role as the Harrier Operational Conversion Unit. In September 1994, four OEU Sea Harriers deployed aboard Invincible, as the carrier cruised in the Adriatic Sea as part of Operation Deny Flight, the NATO enforcement of a UN no-fly zone over Bosnia and Herzegovina during the Bosnian War. The OEU's four Sea Harriers operated with the six Sea Harrier FRS.1s of 800 Squadron during the deployment, with two FA.2s being fired on by S-75 Dvina surface-to-air missiles on 22 November. From 1995, the squadron received Harrier T.8 two seat trainers, a conversion of existing Harrier T.4s to better replicate the Sea Harrier FA.2's avionics.

On 23 March 2005, 899 NAS was disbanded at RNAS Yeovilton, seeing two flypasts – one of the squadron's remaining aircraft (two FA2s and two T8s) and the other composed of former 899 aircraft (Sea Hawk, Sea Vixen and Hunter).

== Aircraft flown ==
The squadron has flown a number of different aircraft types, including:

- Supermarine Seafire F Mk.IIc fighter aircraft (December 1942 – August 1943, October 1943 - March 1944)
- Supermarine Seafire L Mk.IIc fighter aircraft (August - October 1943)
- Supermarine Spitfire Mk.Vb fighter aircraft (December 1943 – March 1944)
- Supermarine Spitfire Mk.Vb/hooked fighter aircraft (January – March 1944)
- Supermarine Seafire L Mk.III fighter aircraft (March 1944 - September 1945)
- Hawker Sea Hawk FGA.6 jet fighter/ground-attack aircraft (November 1955 – January 1957)
- de Havilland Sea Vixen FAW.1 all weather jet fighter aircraft (February 1961 – September 1964)
- de Havilland Sea Vixen FAW.2 all weather jet fighter aircraft (February 1964 – January 1972)
- British Aerospace Sea Harrier FRS.1 V/STOL strike fighter (March 1980 – January 1994)
- Hawker Siddeley Harrier T.4 two-seat training V/STOL ground-attack aircraft (March 1980 – October 1983)
- Hawker Hunter T.8M two-seat trainer (arrestor hook and BlueFox radar) (August 1981 – October 1993)
- Hawker Siddeley Harrier T.4N two-seat training V/STOL Sea Harrier avionics aircraft (September 1983 - October 1996)
- Hawker Siddeley Harrier T.4A two-seat training V/STOL ground-attack aircraft (July 1987 – April 1995)
- British Aerospace Sea Harrier F(A).2 V/STOL strike fighter (June 1993–Mar 2005)
- Hawker Siddeley Harrier T.8 two-seat training V/STOL Sea Harrier avionics aircraft (June 1993 – March 2005)
A selection of aircraft with differing markings previously operated by 899 Naval Air Squadron
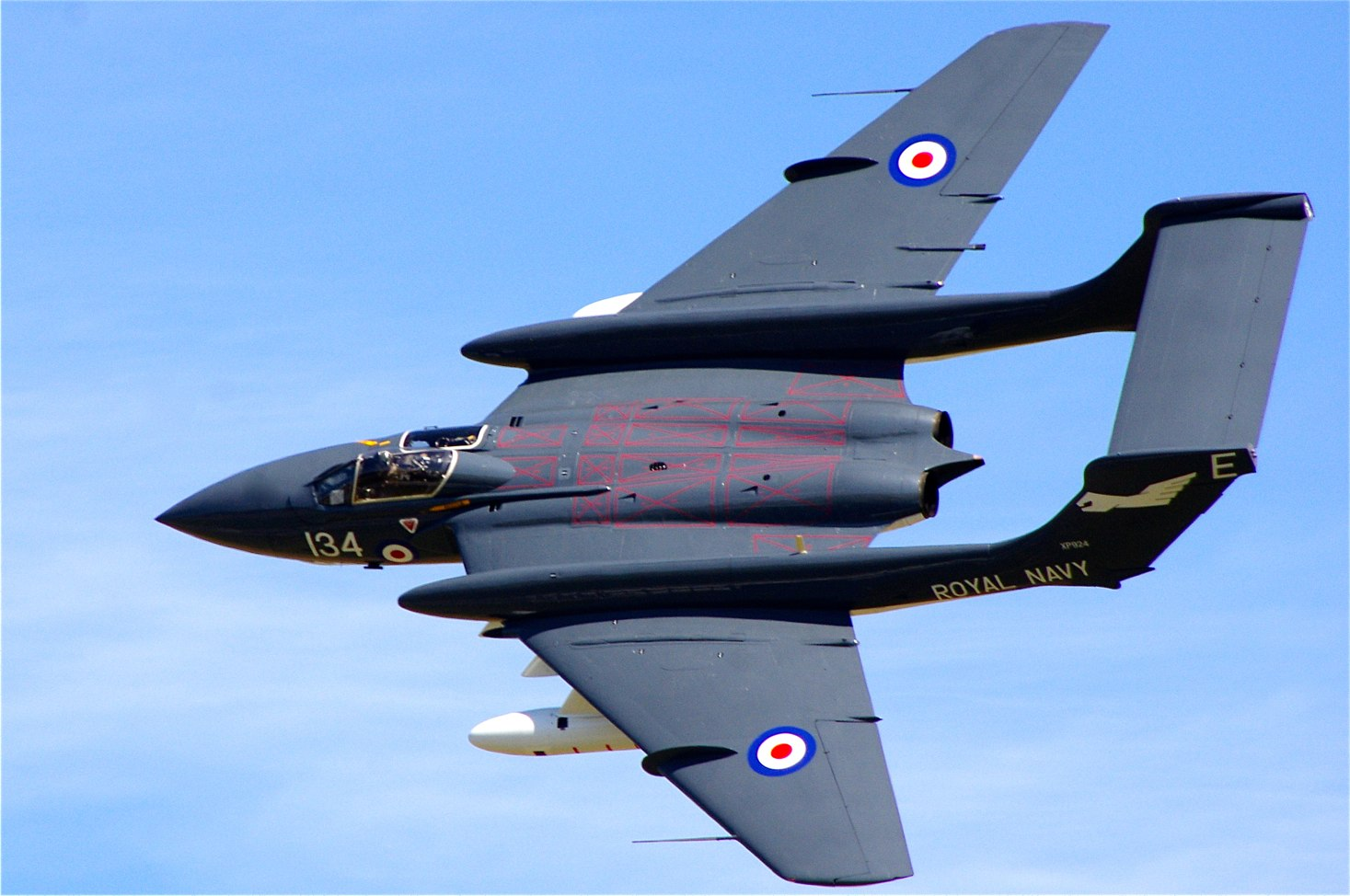
de Havilland Sea Vixen FAW.2, XP924, in 899 Squadron markings

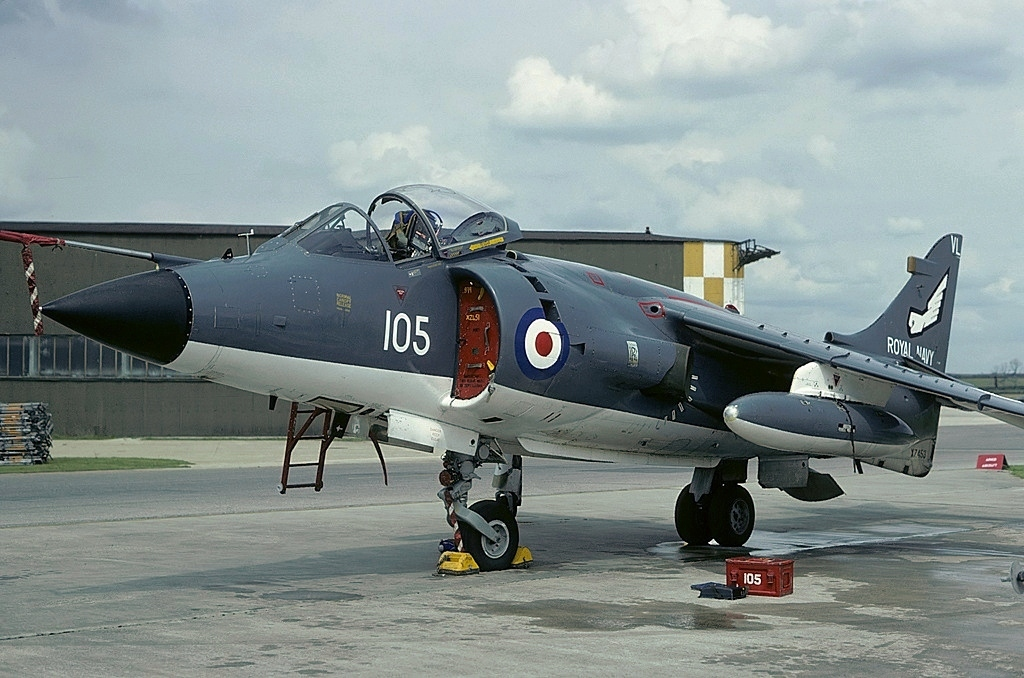
British Aerospace Sea Harrier FRS.1 of 899 Squadron (was involved in a mid-air collision while conducting combat air patrol (CAP) over the Falkland Islands on 6 May 1982)

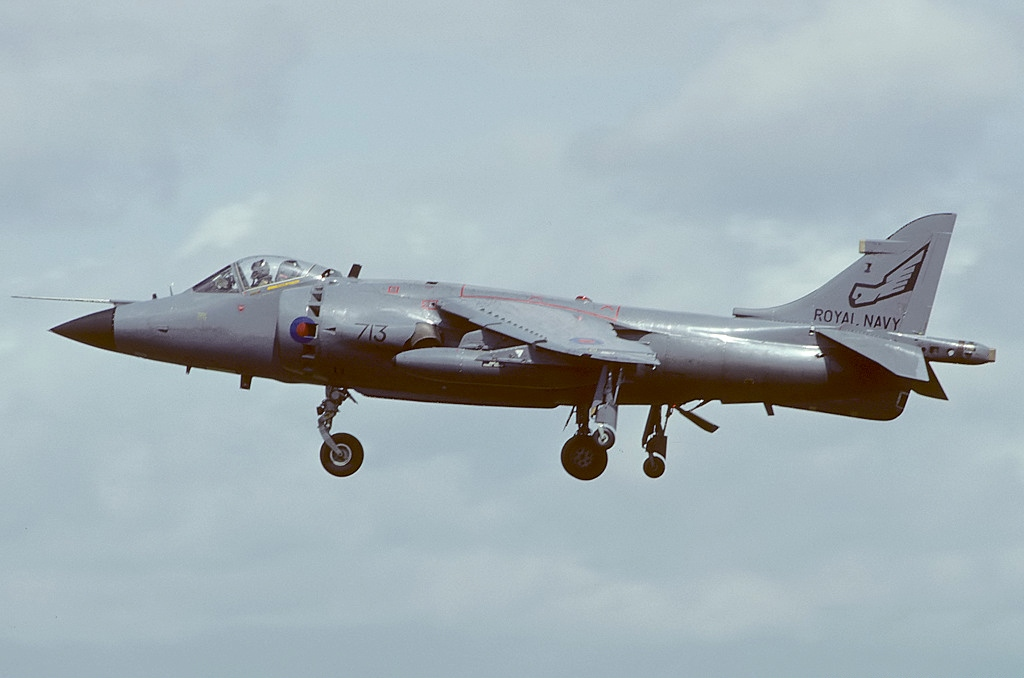
British Aerospace Sea Harrier FRS.1 of 899 Squadron. Last noted as an instructional airframe at the School of Flight Deck Operations, RNAS Culdrose

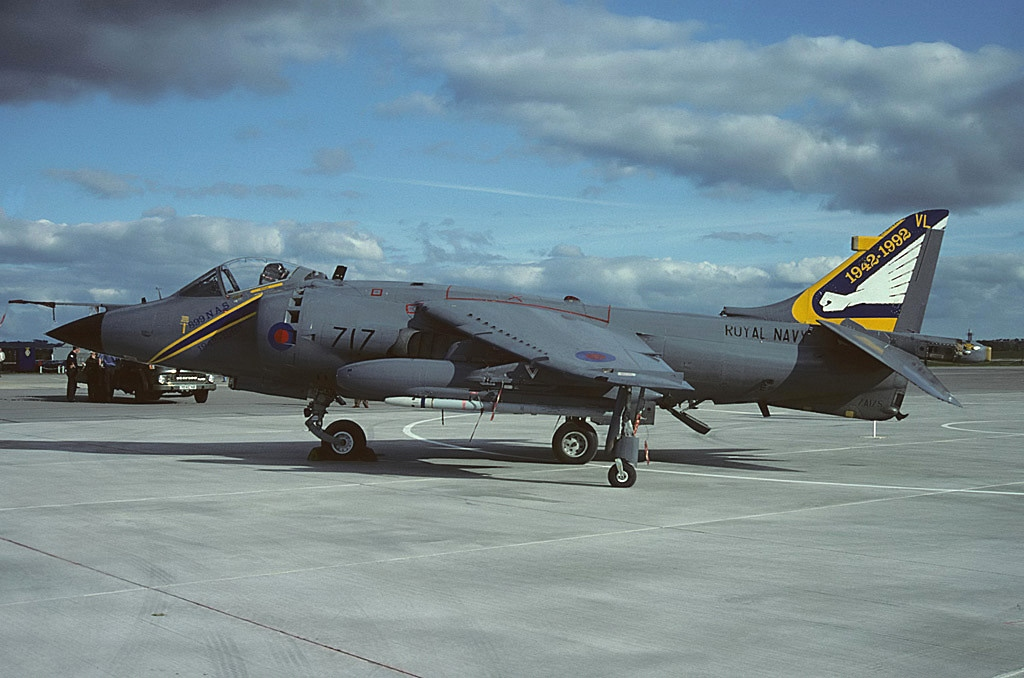
British Aerospace Sea Harrier FRS.1, in special markings to commemorate the 50th anniversary of 899 Squadron

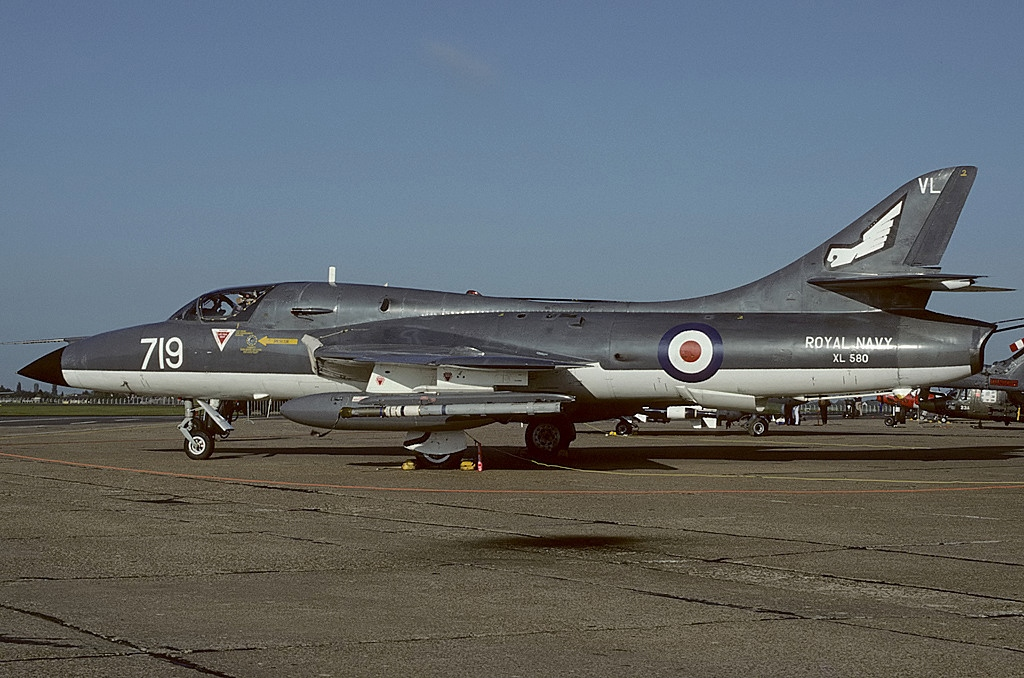
Hawker Hunter T.8M two-seat trainer of 899 Squadron

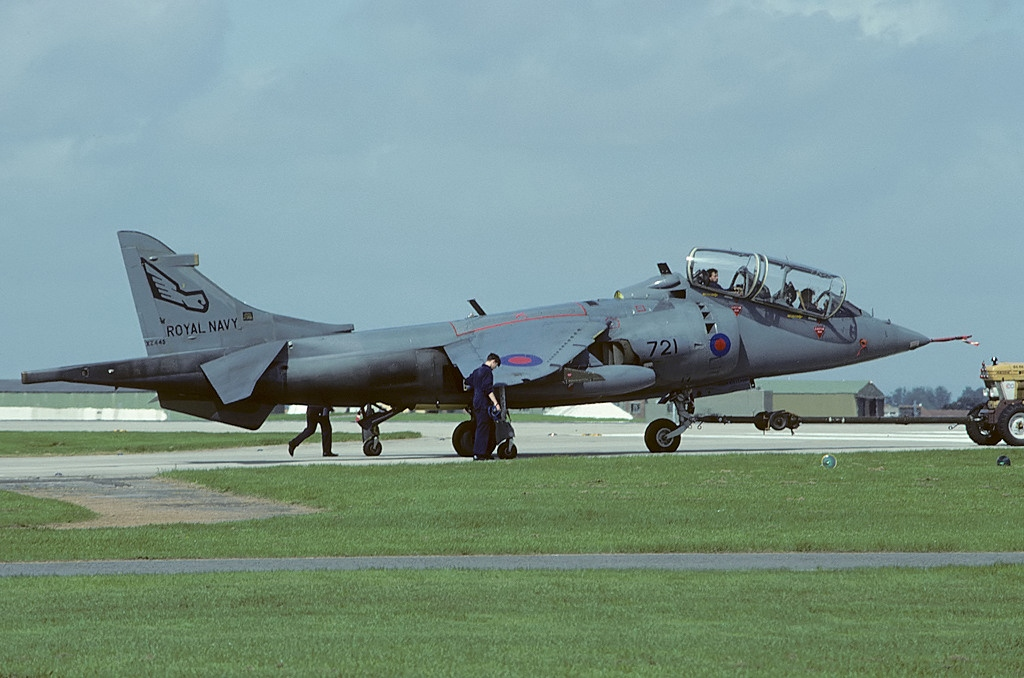
Hawker Siddeley Harrier T.4A of 899 Squadron

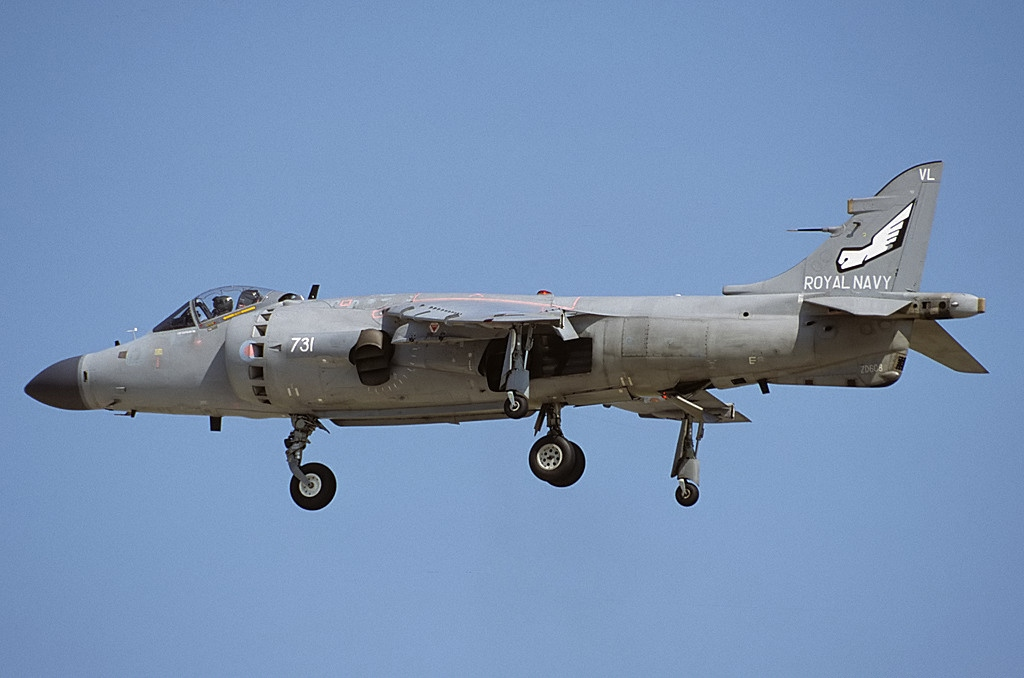
British Aerospace Sea Harrier FA.2 of 899 Squadron

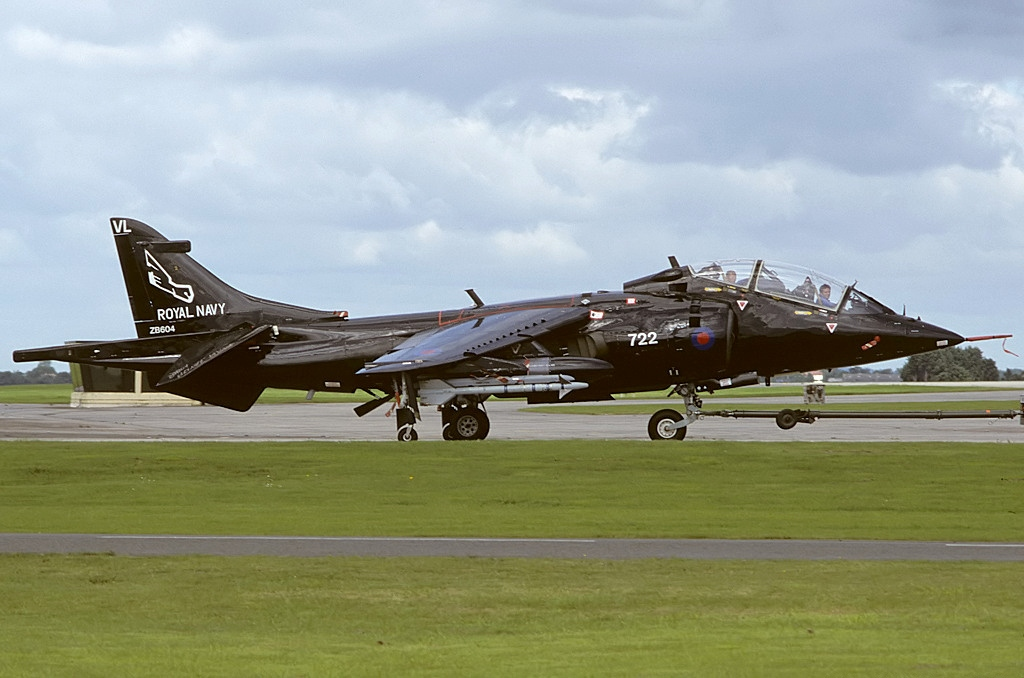
Hawker Siddeley Harrier T.8 of 899 Squadron

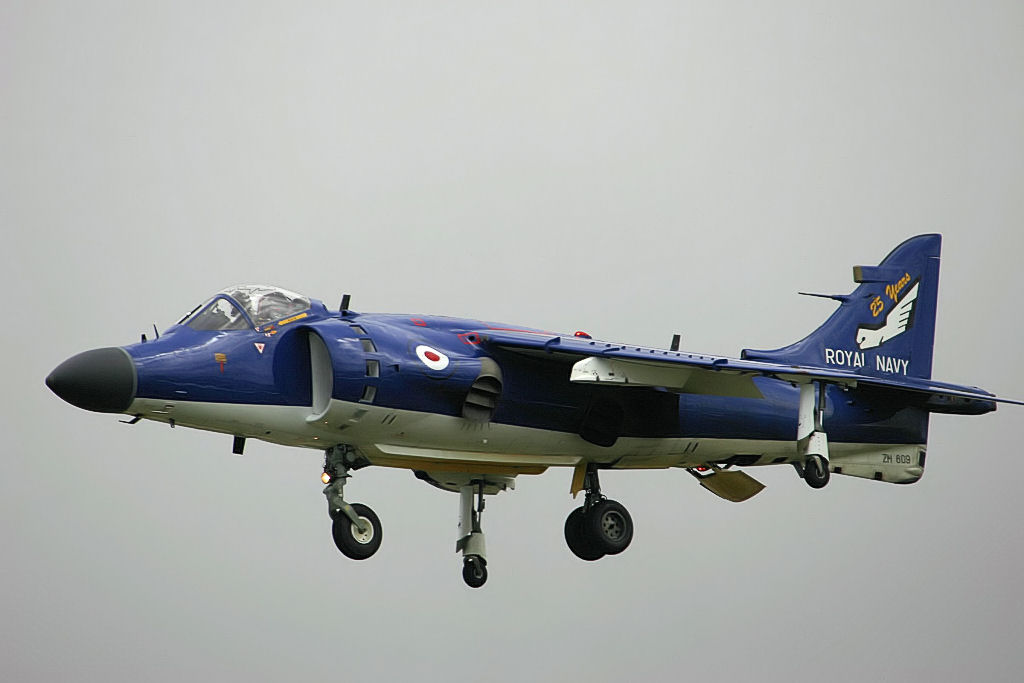
British Aerospace Sea Harrier FA.2, in special colours to commemorate 25 years of 899 Squadron operating Sea Harrier

== Battle honours ==
The battle honours awarded to 899 Naval Air Squadron are:

- Sicily 1943
- Salerno 1943
- South France 1944
- Aegean 1944
- Falklands Islands 1982

== Naval air stations and aircraft carriers ==
899 Naval Air Squadron operated from a number of naval air stations of the Royal Navy and Royal Air Force stations, in the UK and overseas, and also a number of Royal Navy fleet carriers and escort carriers and other airbases overseas:

1942 - 1945

- Royal Naval Air Station Hatston (HMS Sparrowhawk), Mainland, Orkney, (15 December 1942 - 22 February 1943)
- Royal Naval Air Station Machrihanish (HMS Landrail), Argyll and Bute, (22 February - 11 March 1943)
- HMS Indomitable (11 March - 29 July 1943)
  - Royal Naval Air Station Machrihanish (HMS Landrial), Argyll and Bute, (Detachment 22 - 27 April / 12 - 15 May / 29 May - 9 June 1943)
- RN Air Section Gibraltar, Gibraltar, (29 July - 28 August 1943)
- HMS Hunter (28 August - 13 October 1943)
  - Paestum Airfield, Italy, (Detachment 12 - 15 September 1943)
- Royal Air Force Ballyhalbert, County Down, (13 October 1943 - 17 January 1944)
- Royal Naval Aircraft Maintenance Yard Belfast (HMS Gadwall), County Antrim, (17 January - 15 March 1944)
- HMS Argus (Deck Landing Training 15 - 18 March 1944)
- Royal Naval Aircraft Maintenance Yard Belfast (HMS Gadwall), County Antrim, (18 March - 1 April 1944)

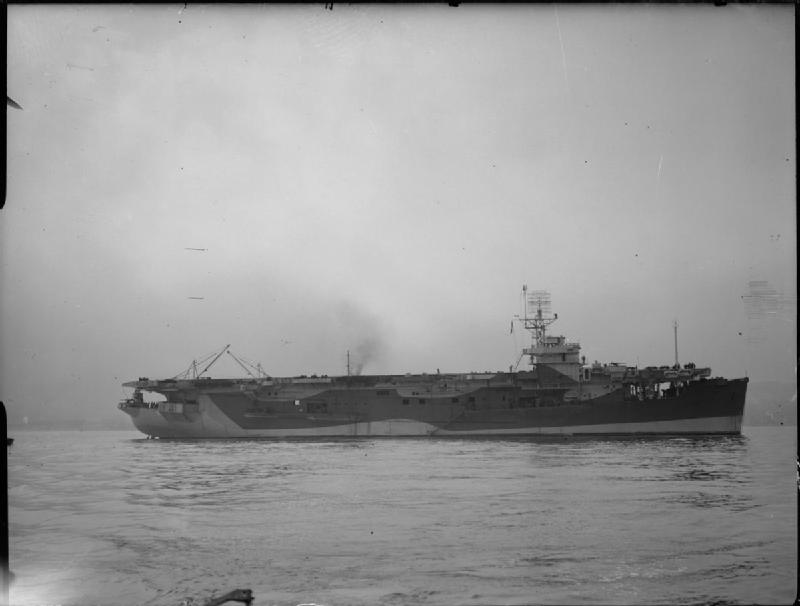
HMS Khedive

- HMS Khedive (1 - 27 April 1944)
- Royal Air Force Long Kesh, Lisburn, (27 April - 12 May 1944)
- HMS Khedive (12 - 31 May 1944)
- Royal Air Force Peterhead (13 Gp), Aberdeenshire, (31 May - 5 July 1944)
- HMS Khedive (5 - 27 July 1944)
- Royal Air Force Hal Far, Malta, (27 July - 1 August 1944)
- HMS Khedive (1 August - 12 October 1944)
  - Royal Naval Air Station Dekheila (HMS Grebe), Alexandria, Egypt, (Detachment six aircraft Deck Landing Training HMS Stalker) (2 - 9 September 1944)
- Royal Air Force Long Kesh, Lisburn, (12 October - 23 November 1944)
- Royal Naval Air Station Ayr (HMS Wagtail), South Ayrshire, (23 - 30 November 1944)
- Royal Air Force Long Kesh, Lisburn, (30 November 1944 - 25 January 1945)
- HMS Chaser (25 - 29 January 1945)
  - Royal Air Force Long Kesh, Lisburn, (Detachment three aircraft 25 January - 23 February 1945)
- Royal Naval Aircraft Maintenance Yard Belfast (HMS Gadwall), County Antrim, (29 January - 25 February 1945)
  - HMS Ravager (Detachment ten aircraft Deck Landing Training (DLT) 5 - 9 February 1945)
- HMS Chaser (25 February - 23 April 1945)
- Royal Naval Air Station Schofields (HMS Nabthorpe), New South Wales, (23 April - 18 September 1945)
- Deck Landing Training from Royal Naval Air Station Maryborough (HMS Nabstock), Queensland:
  - HMS Indomitable (4 - 27 July 1945)
  - HMS Arbiter (15 August/10 - 13 September 1945)
  - RAAF Base Point Cook, Victoria, (Detachment two aircraft 30 August - 4 September 1945)
- disbanded - (18 September 1945)

== Commanding officers ==
List of commanding officers of 899 Naval Air Squadron:

1942 - 1945

- Lieutenant Commander(A) R.F. Walker, RNVR, from 15 December 1942
- Lieutenant Commander(A) R.B. Howarth, RNVR, from 20 October 1943
- Lieutenant Commander(A) G. Dennison, RNVR, from 1 November 1944
- disbanded - 18 September 1945

1955 - 1957

- Lieutenant Commander A.B.B. Clark, RN, from 7 November 1955
- disbanded - 5 January 1957

1961 - 1972

- Lieutenant Commander W.J. Carter, RN, from 1 February 1961 (Commander 30 June 1961)
- Lieutenant Commander D.M.A.H. Hamilton, RN, from 5 March 1962
- Lieutenant Commander J.A. Sanderson, RN, from 2 September 1963
- Commander D.C. Matthews, RN, from 4 May 1964
- Lieutenant Commander T.E.M. Kirby, RN, from 5 July 1965
- Lieutenant Commander G.D. Varley, RN, from 1 September 1966
- Lieutenant Commander R.D. McCulloch, RN, from 2 February 1967
- Lieutenant Commander G.W.G. Hunt, RN, 23 May 1968
- Lieutenant Commander D.J. Dunbar-Dempsey, RN, 1 August 1969
- Lieutenant Commander M.H.G. Layard, RN, from 16 February 1970
- Lieutenant Commander F. Milner, RN, from 8 March 1971
- disbanded - 26 January 1972

1980 - 2005

- Lieutenant Commander N.D. Ward, RN, from 31 March 1980
- Lieutenant Commander N.W. Thomas, RN, from 21 January 1981
- Lieutenant Commander J.C. Gunning, RN, from 30 April 1982
- Lieutenant Commander N.W. Thomas, DSC, RN, from 21 July 1982
- Lieutenant Commander D.J. Thornton, RN, from 3 February 1983
- Lieutenant Commander H.G.B. Slade, RN, from 25 June 1985 (Commander 30 June 1987)
- Lieutenant Commander S. Lidbetter, RN, 9 November 1987 (Commander 31 December 1987)
- Lieutenant Commander W.M. Covington, RN, 14 March 1989 (Commander 30 June 1989)
- Lieutenant Commander I.R.M. Bradshaw, RN, from 5 April 1990
- Lieutenant Commander S.N. Hargreaves, RN, from 7 September 1992
- Lieutenant Commander M.T. Boast, RN, from 8 December 1995
- Lieutenant Commander D.H. MacKay, RN, from 16 December 1998 (Commander 1 October 2000)
- Commander T.C. Eastaugh, RN, from 13 November 2001
- Commander R.C. Payne, RN, from 22 November 2002
- Commander J.A. Lawler, MBE, RN, from 19 April 2004
- disbanded - 31 March 2005

Note: Abbreviation (A) signifies Air Branch of the RN or RNVR.
