= No. 186 Squadron RAF =

Defunct flying squadron of the Royal Air Force

- Active: 1 April 1918 – 1 February 1920; 27 April 1943 – 5 April 1944; 5 October 1944 – 17 July 1945
- Country: United Kingdom
- Branch: Royal Air Force

No. 186 Squadron of the Royal Air Force was formed on 1 April 1918 at East Retford, providing night pilot training for home defence and on the Western front. On 31 December 1918 it was reformed as an operational shipboard unit aboard HMS Argus. In 1919, the squadron became a torpedo development unit, renumbering to become 210 Squadron on 1 February 1920.

The Squadron reformed again, on 27 April 1943, at RAF Drem as a fighter-bomber squadron, eventually receiving its first Hurricanes in August, after transferring to RAF Ayr, converting to Typhoons and later, Spitfire VBs. The squadron was renumbered as 130 squadron on 5 April 1944.

Six months later, on 5 October 1944, The squadron was reformed as a Bomber Command Lancaster unit, based at Tuddenham, and flew its first bombing raid 13 days later. The squadron was disbanded on 17 July 1945.
