= Officer and Aircrew Selection Centre =

Royal Air Force officer selection unit

- Company type: Part of the RAF
- Industry: Armed forces
- Founded: 1962 Biggin Hill 1992 Cranwell
- Headquarters: Cranwell, UK
- Services: Officer Training
- Website: RAF Cranwell Officer and Aircrew Selection Homepage

The Royal Air Force Officer and Aircrew Selection Centre (OASC), at Adastral Hall, RAF Cranwell, Lincolnshire, is the centre through which every potential RAF officer must go to be selected for Initial Officer Training (IOT) and through which potential non-commissioned aircrew must go to be selected for the Direct Entry Senior Non-commissioned Officer (DE-SNCO) course.

== History ==
In 1947 the Aviation Candidate Selection Board was established at RAF Hornchurch following the closure of the Combined Selection Centre at RAF North Weald. In 1952 the name was changed to Aircrew Selection Centre. The centre closed with the airfield in 1962 and was transferred to RAF Biggin Hill. In 1992 it was decided to transfer the selection centre to its current location at RAF Cranwell.

== Selection process ==
During their selection candidates will attend OASC up to three times. These attendances run concurrently with other selection processes, such as generic medicals, filter interviews and the Pre-Joining Fitness Test (PJFT).

The first attendance at OASC will be to complete the Computer Based Aptitude Tests (CBAT). The CBAT is also taken by Royal Navy FAA candidates and British Army AAC candidates. The CBAT comprises twenty-three tests designed to assess your spatial reasoning, multi-tasking, deductive reasoning, work rate, and verbal and numerical reasoning. Different combinations of scores from these tests (along with unique weightings) will then form scores for the eleven roles under consideration. Each role will have a cut-off score which a candidate must achieve to continue with their application for that role.

If successful in their CBAT, candidates will complete an online filter interview (non-officer roles only), service health assessment and the PJFT.

Assuming success in all previous stages of selection, candidates will then be invited back for their OASC Board. This stage comprises one day of selection where candidates will be placed in syndicates and complete various assessments. The day begins with an individual interview designed to assess the candidates knowledge of the RAF and their chosen role (including the training and career progression they can expect) as well as their motivations and aptitude for joining. Candidates then complete a group discussion task, being provided with discussion topics by Directing Staff (DS) to then discuss and debate as a group. Following this candidates will complete a planning exercise, first independently and then as a group. After this candidates will move to "the hangar" where, following a short lunch break, they will be assessed on their practical teamworking and leadership skills. The hangar is made up of various obstacle courses designed to be navigated with the assistance of various physical aides, most commonly wooden planks. The first task will be a leaderless activity with the candidates working together to complete a course. Following this each course will have an assigned leader who will be given special privileges such as being able to analyse the course before the rest of the team (to generate a plan) and to decide the penalties for any breach of the rules.

Following OASC Boarding aircrew and air traffic control candidates will be invited back to OASC for a specialist medical.

If successful in all stages, candidates will then enter the sift, a process where candidates are ranked based on their CBAT and OASC Board scores, with the top set of candidates taken for each Modular Initial Officer Training Course (MIOTC). Failure to be selected for three MIOT Courses will lead to a candidate having to change roles or withdraw their application.

== Facilities ==
The selection centre is attached to two large hangars, and there is a candidates' mess. The centre is home to everything required by a candidate during their selection. This includes a large aptitude testing centre, medical centre (including an optician and a hearing testing facility), interview rooms and syndicate rooms.

== See also ==
- Potential Regiment Officers course (RAF Regiment)
- Army Officer Selection Board (Army)
- Admiralty Interview Board (Navy)
