= Uganda (disambiguation) =

Uganda is a country in East-Central Africa, west of Kenya, east of the Democratic Republic of the Congo.

Uganda or Ugandan may also refer to:

== Places ==
- Uganda (1962–63), an independent sovereign state linked with the British monarchy
- Uganda Protectorate (1894–1962), a protectorate of the British Empire

== Transportation and vehicles ==
- Uganda Airlines, the flag carrier of Uganda from 1977 until 2001
- Air Uganda, a privately owned airline in Uganda from 2007 to 2014
- Uganda Air Cargo, a passenger and cargo airline based in Kampala, Uganda
- HMS Uganda (66), a WWII British light cruiser
- SS Uganda, several ships
  - SS Uganda (1952), a British passenger ship
- Uganda Railway, a former British state-owned railway company
- Uganda Railways Corporation, parastatal railway of Uganda since 1977

== Ugandan ==
- Ugandans, the population of Uganda
- Culture of Uganda, a diverse range of ethnic groups in Uganda
- Ugandan cuisine, traditional and modern cooking styles, practices, foods and dishes in Uganda
- Ugandan English, English dialect native to Uganda
- Ugandan nationality law, the Uganda Citizenship and Immigration Control Act

== War and Arms ==
- Uganda–Tanzania War, 1978–1979 war in Africa
- Ugandan Bush War, Guerrilla war in Uganda 1980–1986
- Uganda Army (1971–1980), Ugandan national armed forces under Idi Amin
- Uganda Army (1962–1971), Ugandan national armed forces under Mutesa II and Obote I
- Uganda Air Force, Air warfare branch of Uganda's military
- Uganda People's Defence Force, Armed forces of Uganda

== Teams ==
- Uganda national football team, Association football team
- Uganda national cricket team, Cricket team
- Uganda women's national football team, Women's national association football team representing Uganda
- Uganda at the 2012 Summer Olympics, Sporting event delegation

== Other uses ==
- Miss Uganda, a national beauty pageant in Uganda
- Mr. Uganda, a pro-wrestler
- Uganda Museum, ethnological museum in Kampala, Uganda
- Uganda Scheme, 1903 plan for a Jewish homeland in British East Africa
- Uganda Land Commission, Ugandan government agency
- Uganda Landmine Survivors Association, is a non-governmental organization,

== See also ==
- Bishop of Uganda, a position in the Anglican diocese of Namirembe
- Church of Uganda, an Anglican sect
- Ugandan shilling, the currency of Uganda
