= Battle of Goose Green =

Battle of the Falklands War in May 1982

- Part of the Falklands War
- Darwin schoolhouse on fire
Date	28–29 May 1982
Location	Goose Green; Darwin, Falkland Islands 51°49′43.8″S 58°58′9″W
Result	British victory
Territorial changes	Liberation of Goose Green and Darwin from Argentine Occupation

Belligerents
United Kingdom	Argentina

Commanders and leaders
Herbert "H" Jones †; Chris Keeble; (Royal Navy) Commander P.J. Bootherstone	(Argentina) Ítalo Ángel Piaggi (surrendered); (Argentina) Wilson Pedrozo

Units involved
3 Commando Brigade; 2nd Battalion, Parachute Regiment; 29th Commando Regiment; Royal Navy; Royal Air Force	12th Infantry Regiment; (Argentina) 25th Infantry Regiment; (Argentina) 601st AA Artillery; (Argentina) 4th Airborne Artillery

Strength
690; 3 fighter aircraft; 1 frigate	1000 to 1600

Casualties and losses
18 killed; 33-64 wounded; 1 helicopter; 1 attack aircraft	45–55 killed; 112–145wounded; 961 -1500 captured; 3 attack aircraft

Goose Green and Darwin on the isthmus connecting Lafonia (south) with Wickham Heights (north)

The Battle of Goose Green (Spanish: Batalla de Pradera del Ganso) was fought from the 28th to the 29th of May 1982 by British and Argentine forces during the Falklands War. Located on East Falkland's central isthmus, the settlement of Goose Green was the site of a tactically vital airfield. Argentine forces were located in a well-defended position within striking distance of San Carlos Water, where the British task force had positioned themselves after their amphibious landing.

The main body of the British assault force was composed of the 2nd Battalion, Parachute Regiment (2 PARA), commanded by Lieutenant-Colonel Herbert Jones. BBC Radio broadcast news of the imminent attack on Goose Green. Knowing that this had likely forewarned the Argentinian defenders, the broadcast resulted in immediate criticism from Jones and other British personnel.

After the attack began in the early hours of 28 May, the 2 PARA advance was stalled by fixed trenches with interlocking fields of fire. Jones was killed during a solo charge on a machine-gun post. The Argentinian garrison agreed to a ceasefire and formally surrendered the following morning. As a result of his actions, Jones received a posthumous Victoria Cross.

== Prelude ==
=== Terrain and conditions ===
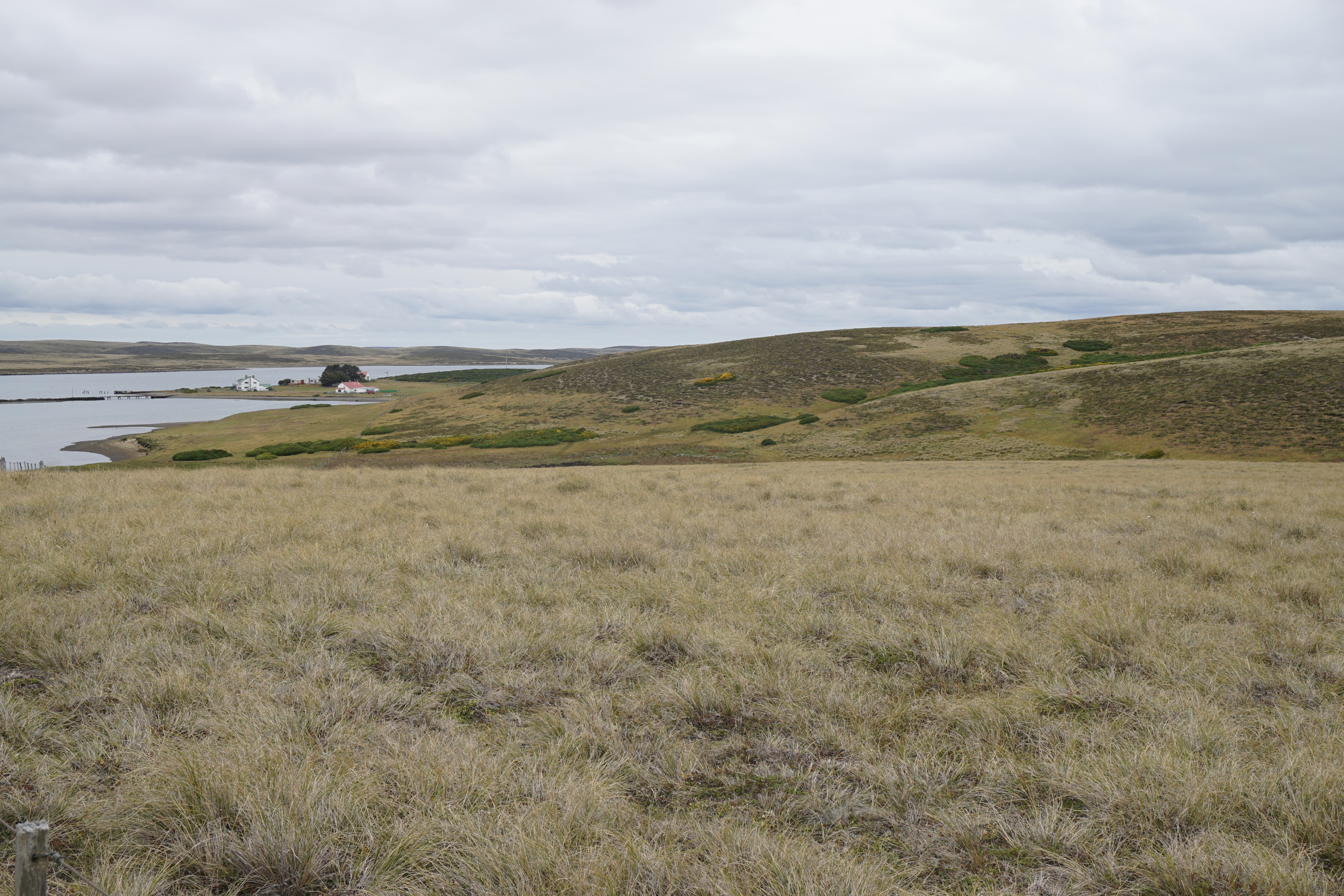
The vegetation and terrain around Goose Green: low tussock covered hills with gorse filled valleys

Goose Green and Darwin are on a narrow isthmus connecting Lafonia to the south with Wickham Heights in the north. The isthmus has two settlements: Darwin to the north, and Goose Green to the south. The terrain is rolling and treeless, and is covered with grassy outcrops, as well as areas of thick gorse and peat bogs, making camouflage and concealment extremely difficult. The islands have a cold, damp climate. From May to August (which is winter in the southern hemisphere), the ground is saturated and frequently covered with salty water, making walking slow and exhausting, particularly at night. Drizzly rains occur two out of every three days, with continuous winds, and with periods of rain, snow, fog, and sun changing rapidly. Sunshine is minimal, leaving few opportunities for troops to warm up and dry off.

=== Background ===
The bulk of the Argentine forces on the islands were in positions around Port Stanley, 50 miles (80 km) to the east of the isthmus and San Carlos, the site of the main British landings. An Argentinian force had been deployed to Goose Green and Darwin and was supported by artillery, mortars, 35 mm cannons, and machine guns. British intelligence incorrectly indicated that the Argentine force present possessed limited offensive capabilities and did not pose a major threat to the landing area at San Carlos. Consequently, the Goose Green garrison seemed to have no strategic military value for the British in their campaign to recapture the islands and the initial plans for land operations had called for Goose Green to be isolated and bypassed.

After the British landings at San Carlos on 21 May and while the bridgehead was being consolidated, British activities were limited to digging fortified positions, patrolling, and waiting; during this time Argentine air attacks caused significant damage to, and the loss of, British ships in the area around the landing grounds. These attacks and the lack of breakout by the landed forces out of the San Carlos area led to a feeling among senior commanders and politicians in the UK that the momentum of the campaign was waning. As a result, British Joint Headquarters in the UK came under increasing pressure from the British government for an early ground offensive for political and propaganda value. There was also UN pressure for a cease-fire and the UK government position was that the taking of the Darwin–Goose Green isthmus was imperative before any such cease-fire decision as it would allow British forces to control access to the entire Lafonia and thus a significant portion of East Falkland. On 25 May Brigadier Julian Thompson, commanding 3 Commando Brigade, was ordered to mount an attack on Argentine positions around Goose Green and Darwin.

=== Argentine defences ===
The defending Argentine forces, known as Task Force Mercedes, consisted of two companies of Lieutenant-Colonel Ítalo Piaggi's 12th Infantry Regiment (RI 12). His third company (Company B) was still deployed on Mount Kent as "Combat Team Solari" and only re-joined RI 12 after the fall of Goose Green airfield. The task force also contained a company of the commando-type 25th "Special" Infantry Regiment (RI 25). Air defence was provided by a battery of six 20 mm Rheinmetall anti-aircraft guns, manned by air force personnel and two radar-guided Oerlikon 35 mm anti-aircraft guns from the 601st Anti-Aircraft Battalion. Both the 20mm and 35mm anti-aircraft cannon could also be used in a direct fire ground support role, and this was the case in the last stages of the fighting. There was also one battery of three OTO Melara Mod 56 105 mm pack howitzers from the 4th Airborne Artillery Regiment. Pucará aircraft, based at Stanley and armed with rockets and napalm could provide close air support. The total forces under Piaggi's command numbered 1,083 men.

Piaggi's role was to provide a reserve battle group (Task Force Mercedes) in support of other forces deployed to the west of Stanley and secondly to occupy and defend the Darwin isthmus as well as the Military Air Base Cóndor at Goose Green. He deployed the two companies in an all-round defence with A Company, RI12 the key to his defence; they were deployed along a gorse hedge running across the Darwin isthmus from Darwin Hill to Boca House. He deployed his reconnaissance platoon (under Lieutenant Carlos Marcelo Morales) as an advance screen forward of RI 12's A Company, towards Coronation Ridge, while RI 12's C Company were deployed south of Goose Green to cover the approaches from Lafonia. To substitute for the absent B Company, he created a composite company from headquarters and other staff and deployed them in Goose Green hamlet. RI 25's C (Ranger) Company (under paratroop-trained First Lieutenant Carlos Daniel Esteban) provided a mobile reserve, from the schoolhouse in Goose Green. Elements were also deployed to Darwin settlement, Salinas Beach, and Boca House and the air force security cadets, together with the anti-aircraft elements, were charged with protecting the airfield. Minefields had been laid in areas deemed tactically important, to provide further defence against attack.

On paper Piaggi had a full regiment, but it consisted of units from three separate regiments from two different brigades, none of whom had ever worked together. RI 12 consisted mostly of conscripts from the northern, sub-tropical province of Corrientes, while the RI 25 Company was considered an elite formation and had received commando training. (Note: The men of C Company RI 25 fought with courage, perseverance, and effectiveness at San Carlos and Goose Green, having received a good deal of special forces training under the energetic command of Lieutenant Colonel Seineldín.) Some elements were well trained and displayed a high degree of morale and motivation (C Company RI 25 and A Battery 4th Airborne Artillery Group); with Lieutenant Ignacio Gorriti of B Company RI 12 remarking that "there was no need for speeches. From the beginning, we knew how important the Malvinas were. It was a kind of love; we were going to defend something that was ours." Other units were less well-motivated, with the 12th Regiment chaplain, Santiago Mora, writing:

The conscripts of 25th Infantry wanted to fight and cover themselves in glory. The conscripts of the 12th Infantry Regiment fought because they were told to do so. This did not make them any less brave. On the whole, they remained admirably calm.

Private Esteban Roberto Avalos fought in the Falklands as a sniper in RI 12's B Company. In all, some fifty hand-picked 12th Regiment conscripts and non-commissioned officers (NCOs) had received Ranger-type training from visiting Halcón 8 (Falcon 8) army commandos in 1981, and then returned to their respective companies:

In my particular case, I ended up being a sharpshooter for which I had been preparing since the time we were out in the field, where I had the opportunity to shoot with a FAL. During the 45 days we spent there, we had to practice shooting three or four times a week, and those moments were taken advantage of to learn the shooting positions and familiarize ourselves with the weapon. The dealings with the superiors, in general, were excellent, although if somebody screwed up, we all paid the price. The most common punishments were taking us to the showers at night, forcing us to do push-ups or demand from us heaps of frog leaps and crawling. If someone took the wrong step, for example, it was reasonable to be pulled out of training, and they would make you 'dance' a little with push-ups on the thistles or the mud. Now, going back to the subject of instruction, I would say that it was generally satisfactory, at least as far as our group was concerned, since we had basic training in the use of explosives and we were even given some classes in self-defence."

The Argentine positions were well selected, and officers well briefed. In the weeks before the British invasion, airstrikes, naval bombardment, their own poor logistic support and inclement conditions had contributed to the erosion of morale amongst conscripts. On 19 May, an Argentine Air Force C-130 Hercules parachuted in eight tons of tinned provisions that significantly boosted the morale of Task Force Mercedes. (Note: "The logistic chain from Stanley had failed and on 10 May Piaggi gave the companies permission to butcher sheep, which were in abundance. On 19 May morale had been raised when a C-130 flying from the mainland parachuted in eight tons of canned food.") This parachute drop of supplies, according to Private Domingo Víctor Álamo of the 25th Special (Ranger) Regiment's C Company allowed fellow Rangers like himself to get two servings of rations and soft drinks on 25 May while celebrating Argentine independence day.According to Private José Apolonio López from A Company 12th Regiment, these newly arrived provisions allowed Task Force Mercedes to request 2 Argentine Air Force Chinook helicopters to arrive in BAM Cóndor from Stanley and deliver 100 much-needed large ration boxes (containing such luxuries like canned tuna in olive oil and packets of premium cigarettes) to the forward rifle company (under First Lieutenant Jorge Manresa) defending Darwin Parks on 23 May and these boxes were equally distributed among the officers, NCOs and conscripts of A/RI 12.

At the start of the battle, the Argentinian forces had about the same number of effective combatants as the British paratroopers.

=== British forces ===
Thompson ordered the 2nd Battalion, Parachute Regiment, (2 PARA) to conduct an attack on Goose Green, as they were the unit closest to the isthmus in the San Carlos defensive perimeter. He ordered Lieutenant-Colonel Herbert "H" Jones, the commanding officer of 2 PARA, to "carry out a raid on Goose Green isthmus and capture the settlements before withdrawing to be in reserve for the main thrust to the north." The "capture" component appealed more to Jones than the "raid" component, although Thompson later acknowledged that he had assigned insufficient forces to rapidly execute the "capture" part of the orders.

2 PARA comprised three rifle companies, a patrol company, a support company and a headquarters company. Thompson allocated three of 29 Commando Regiments, 105 mm artillery pieces, with 960 rounds, a MILAN anti-tank missile platoon; and Scout helicopters for resupply and casualty evacuation (CASEVAC). Close air support was available from three Royal Air Force Harrier jets, while naval gunfire support was scheduled to be provided by HMS Arrow at the start of the battle.

=== Attack plan ===
A survey by the Special Air Service (SAS) indicated that the Darwin Goose Green area was occupied by a single Argentine company. However, brigade intelligence assessed that the enemy force comprised three infantry companies, two from RI 12, one from RI 25, a platoon from 8IR and a possible amphibious platoon, supported by artillery. Despite these discrepancies, Lieutenant Colonel H. Jones appeared untroubled by the conflicting reports. He placed greater confidence in the SAS assessment, erroneously assuming that their presence on the ground enabled them to provide more accurate intelligence than brigade staff. Based on this intelligence and orders from Thompson, Jones devised a six-phase operation involving a combination of night and daylight manoeuvres, with alternating silent and noisy phases.

1. C Company was to secure the start line, and then;
2. A Company was to launch the attack from the start line on the left (Darwin) side of the isthmus;
3. B Company would then launch their attack from the start line directly after A Company had initiated contact and would advance on the right (Boca House) side of the isthmus;
4. Once A and B companies had secured their initial objectives, D Company would advance from the start line between A and B companies and were to take defence positions once having reached their objective.
5. This would be followed by C Company, who would pass through D Company and neutralise any remaining Argentine reserves;
6. C Company would then advance again and clear the Goose Green airfield and the settlements of Darwin and Goose Green would be secured by A and D companies respectively.

As the majority of helicopter airlift capability had been lost with the sinking of SS Atlantic Conveyor, 2 PARA were required to march the 13 miles (21 km) from San Carlos to their forming-up point at Camilla Creek House. C Company, along with the Commando engineers, departed the forming-up point at 22:00 on 27 May to clear the route to the start line. A fire support base, comprising air and naval fire controllers, mortars and snipers, was established by Support Company west of Camilla Creek, and was in position by 02:00 on the morning of 28 May. The three 105mm guns, along with their crews and ammunition, were transported to Camilla Creek House by Sea King helicopters after last light on 27 May. The assault was to be initiated by A Company at 03:00, but due to delays in registering supporting fire from HMS Arrow, the attack commenced at 03:35.

=== Initial contact ===
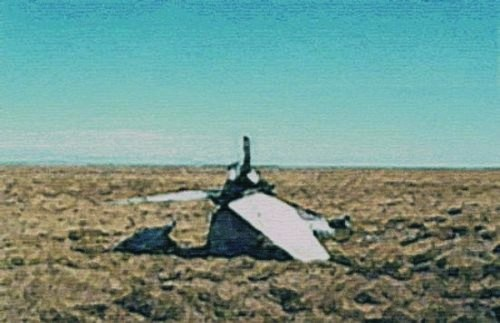
Remains of Harrier XZ988, shot down on 27 May

As part of the diversionary raids to cover the British landings in the San Carlos area on 21 May the British conducted a naval bombardment and launched air attacks on Goose Green. In addition 'D' Squadron of the SAS mounted a major raid to simulate a battalion-sized attack on A Company RI 12, who were dug in on Darwin Ridge. (Note: We were landed to the East of Mount Usborne carrying huge weights of ammunition just after dark on the night of 20/21 May.) The following day, 22 May, four RAF Harriers armed with cluster bombs were launched from Hermes to attack the fuel dumps and Pucarás at Cóndor airfield at Goose Green. The Harriers met intense anti-aircraft fire during their attack.

On the night of 26–27 May, two rifle platoons from Manresa's A Company mounted a retaliatory raid on the SAS positions on Mount Usborne, but on reaching the summit were surprised to find that the SAS had already vacated the feature. The next day Sub-Lieutenant Ernesto Orlando Peluffo on Darwin Ridge spotted British troops conducting reconnaissance patrols and with his 12IR platoon fired on the patrol with long-range machine-gun fire in the hours before the start of the attack.

Throughout 27 May, Royal Air Force Harriers were active over Goose Green. One of them, responding to a call for help from Captain Paul Farrar's C (Patrols) Company, was lost to 35 mm fire while attacking Darwin Ridge. The preliminary fire, probing patrols and SAS raid, the Harrier attacks, the sighting of the forward British paratroopers, and the BBC announcing that the 2nd Battalion of the Parachute Regiment was poised and ready to assault Darwin and Goose Green the day before the assault alerted the Argentine garrison to the impending attack.

== Battle ==
=== Darwin Parks ===
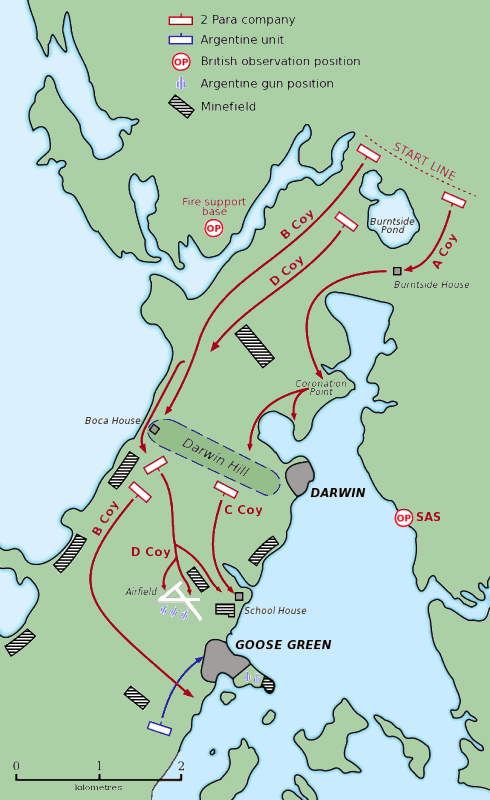
Map 1: The planned assault on Goose Green, 28–29 May 1982

At 3:35am HMS Arrow opened fire, firing a total of 22 star shells and 135 rounds of 4.5" high-explosive shells during a 90-minute bombardment, signalling the start of the attack. This is contradicted by Corporal John Geddes of 'C' Company, who stated Arrow fired one star shell then signalled "gun out" and returned to the Task Force. The attacking British companies also received support from the gunners of 29 Corunna Battery, who fired about 1,000 rounds mostly in the night action. (Note: "This operation was preceded by heavy NGS bombardment and by over 1000 artillery rounds.") (Note: "By daybreak, 8 Commando Battery was practically out of ammunition.") Major Philip Neame along with his D Company examined the forward Argentine platoon positions in the early light and concluded that several Argentines had been killed in the initial parachute infantry assault or the earlier Royal Navy softening up bombardment. "With nothing else to occupy us, we took closer stock of our immediate surroundings. Around us lay a dozen dead Argentinians – the product of B Company's earlier advance, or perhaps the work of HMS Arrow's gun before she cleared off."

2 PARA's A Company, under command of Major Dair Farrar-Hockley, were first to advance after the completion of the preparatory fire from HMS Arrow (which was off-target and ineffective). They were to take Burntside House as their first objective. They came under fire from Argentine positions close to the house but managed to reach the objective without any casualties, finding that it was occupied by four Falklanders and that the house itself had never been held by the Argentine forces. They were instructed to wait at Burntside House, instead of exploiting their favourable position and advancing further.

B Company, under the command of Major John Crosland, followed in the next phase of the attack and were to secure Burntside Hill and then continue to Boca Hill. Where A Company had advanced down the left-side of the isthmus, B Company were to follow the coast on the right-side of the attack. After a significant delay, they advanced and initially encountered very little resistance in the forward trenches. Approaching Burntside Hill, they exchanged fire with the Argentine defenders and on reaching the top of the hill, they found the first positions empty. The rifle platoon under Sub-Lieutenant Gustavo Adolfo Malacalza from A Company from their defensive position fought a fierce delaying action against the British paratroopers before withdrawing with the officer risking death or serious injury while guiding his men through an unknown defensive minefield to new positions on Darwin Ridge. The Paras in No. 5 Platoon (under Lieutenant Geoffrey Weighell) from B Company were forced to use white phosphorus (WP) grenades against Malacalza's men after discovering their fragmentation grenades were largely ineffective in clearing trenches in the night action. (Note: "The first attempts at clearing them had little impact. After we laid down some fire on each trench, Neil Dance's half section went forward and threw L2 grenades into it. These proved to be worse than useless and the Argentinians were soon firing back at us with machine-guns and FN rifles. With the weight of fire they threw up, who knows how none of us got killed ... Having no luck with the L2 grenades, some of the lads began throwing Willie Petes (white phosphorus grenades) into the Argie trenches. In a blinding flash, the chemicals burned and we heard the screams.")During this phase of the night action, Privates Néstor Oscar Avelino Pegoraro and Roque Evaristo Sánchez, ignoring calls in Spanish to surrender via loudspeaker on the part of an attached Royal Marine officer (Captain Roderick Bell) who had been born in Costa Rica, gave their lives to cover the initial Argentine retreat for which they were posthumously awarded the Medal of Valour in Combat.

The Coronation Ridge position temporarily halted Neame's D Company as they advanced between A and B companies. They encountered heavy fire from an Argentine machine-gun team and protecting riflemen with the machine-gun attacked and silenced by two paratroopers, for which they would be awarded decorations for bravery. (Note: Two of the D Company men, 24-year-old Lance-Corporal Gary Bingley and 19-year-old Private Barry Grayling, darted out from cover to charge the enemy machine gun nest and to protect advancing riflemen. Both were hit 10 metres (11 yd) from the machine gun, but shot two of the gun's crew before collapsing. Bingley was hit in the head and killed, while Grayling sustained a wound to the hip which he survived. Bingley was posthumously awarded the Military Medal, and Grayling was decorated with the Queen's Gallantry Medal.) With this machine gun out of action and the protecting rifle-teams dispersed, D Company were able to continue to clear the Argentine platoon position on Coronation Ridge (under 2nd Lieutenant Marcelo Bracco) but lost three men (Lance-Corporals Anthony Cork, Gary Bingley and Private Mark Fletcher) killed in taking the hill. For the stand made on the part of his men on Coronotion Ridge and for the Argentine officer helping recover in person his fallen soldiers after the battle, Bracco would receive a Certificate of Valour from the La Comisión Permanente de Homenaje a la Gesta del Atlántico Sur in 2016.

According to Crosland, 2 PARA lost nearly 3 hours in the advance through Goose Green Parks, having to clear two Argentine platoon positions under Malacalza and Bracco in the dark. During the night action, Crosland and his second-in-command (Captain John Young) were very nearly killed or seriously wounded when two Argentine artillery or mortar rounds landed between them but failed to explode. (Note: During this action, Major John Crosland and his company headquarters came under fire from enemy mortars and artillery; at one point two shells landed between Crosland and his second-in-command, Captain John Young, but fortunately they failed to explode.") According to British military historian Martin Middlebrook, the paras found several frightened Argentine conscripts curled up at the bottom of their trenches, and allowed themselves to be taken prisoner without a fight.In the early to late 1980s, Major Chris Keeble who had been second-in-command of parachute battalion and Sergeant Ian Aird from B Company 2 PARA described the night combat for Darwin Parks to British historians Paul Eddy, Magnus Linklater, Michael Bilton and Peter Kosminsky as having been on the most part extremely brutal requiring British superior night-fighting skills in order to be able to close in with Manresa's men, the heavy use of fragmentation and white phosphorus hand grenades to deal with the Argentine machine-gun teams and protecting rifle men with little quarter given or taken in the process.

At around 7:30 am the 1st Rifle Platoon from the RI 25's C Company, under the command of 2nd Lieutenant Roberto Estévez, received orders to counterattack against 2 PARA's B Company. (Note: "It was still dark when Estevez moved north past the dairy, up the reverse slope of Darwin Hill, over the gorseline to join Pelufo's platoon on the ridge west of the settlement. The two officers conferred. Estevez explained that his orders were to counter-attack, to advance north to assist Manresa's A Company.") The Argentine platoon was able to block the British advance by taking up positions on Darwin Hill, from which, although wounded, Estévez started calling down fire support from Argentine 105 mm artillery and 120 mm mortars. This indirect fire held up the advance of 2 PARA's A Company, especially as they were in open ground on the forward slope of the hill as they prepared to take up their advance once again. A Company was forced to take cover in the nearby trenches. Estévez continued to direct the Argentine artillery fire until he was killed by sniper fire. (Note: "He was hit in the leg, arm and left eye, while crouched with his radio operator, Private Carrascul, trying to adjust supporting artillery fire. Carrascul continued to fight the battle over the radio himself until he, too, was killed. It is an interesting example of the closeness that often develops, despite the differences in rank, between an officer and his operator. The officer relies heavily on the competence of his radio operator.") 2nd Lieutenant Roberto Estévez and his radio operator, Private Fabricio Edgar Carrascul were both posthumously decorated for their actions. (Note: Estévez was awarded the Argentine Nation to the Heroic Valour in Combat Cross (CHVC) and Private Carrascul was cited for the Medal of Valour in Combat.) Private Guillermo Huircapán from Estévez's platoon described the morning action:

Lieutenant Estévez went from one side to the other organizing the defence until all at once they got him in the shoulder. But with that and everything, badly wounded, he kept crawling along the trenches, giving orders, encouraging the soldiers, asking for everyone. A little later, they got him in the side, but just the same, from the trench, he continued directing the artillery fire by radio. There was a little pause, and then the English began the attack again, trying to advance, and again we beat them off.

The British A Company assault had been stopped by fire from a RI 12 platoon (under Sub-Lieutenant Ernesto Peluffo) after their platoon sergeant (Buenaventura Jumilla) had observed the British approach and yelled out a warning. Farrar-Hockley then spotted Argentine reinforcements on the hills before him and shouted, "Ambush! Take cover!" just as the RI 12 platoon's machine-guns opened fire. British reconnaissance patrols had reported wrongly that the Argentine defenders lacked overhead cover. In reality, their trenches had good roofing and all the reports of a demoralised and unwilling enemy proved to be unfounded. "All this rubbish about them not wanting to fight", Keeble told British reporters. "They were fighting hard." (Note: "Intelligence had reported specifically that the Argentines lacked overhead protection. In reality, their trenches were strongly roofed, and all the reports of a demoralised and unmotivated garrison seemed confounded. "All this rubbish about them not wanting to fight", said Keeble witheringly. "They were fighting hard.") The Royal Engineer officer attached to Farrar-Hockley's company, Lieutenant Clive Livingstone, wrote about the initial fight for Darwin Hill:

A massive volume of medium machine-gun fire was unleashed on us from a range of about 400 metres. The light now rapidly appearing enabled the enemy to identify targets and bring down very effective fire. Although this too would work for us, the weight of fire we could produce was not in proportion to the massive response it brought. We stopped firing — our main concern was to move away whenever pauses occurred in the attention being paid to us. The two platoons were not able to suppress the trenches, which were giving us so much trouble. We took about 45 minutes to extract ourselves through the use of smoke and pauses in the firing.

The A Company Paras were in the gorse line at the bottom of Darwin Hill facing the entrenched Argentines, who were looking down the hill at them. They were pinned down by heavy machine gun and automatic rifle fire as well as sniper fire for an hour before withdrawing to the base of Coronation Ridge, between 9 and 10 am. 2 PARA's B Company also broke off their attacks and began to withdraw to the reverse side of Middle Hill. Their defence and the re-organisation of the attack was organised by 2 PARA's second-in-command. The British A and B Companies could not get across the open ground to get at the Argentine machine-guns and snipers, (Note: Corporal David Abols later said that an Argentine sniper who killed seven paras with shots to the head during the morning fighting was mainly responsible for holding up A Company. "This sniper fire was responsible for the deaths of at least seven paratroopers, according to Abols – 'all headshots. That is the main reason A Company was stuck'. He says the sniper was firing from about 500 metres behind the Darwin Hill position.") and after five hours of fighting, their ammunition supply was becoming critical. Nevertheless, the paras with Spanish-speaking Royal Marines Captain Roderick Bell forward with them, using a loudspeaker (Note: "Bell's equipment consisted of a loudspeaker borrowed from Fearless and a heavy, 24-volt dry-cell battery.") again called on the Argentines to surrender. (Note: "La conducta de Ernesto Peluffo causo la admiración de sus propios adversarios, uno de los cuales, el capitán Rod Bell le gritaba en castellano que se rindiera durante la lucha, sin resultado.")

=== Death of H. Jones ===
With both A and B Companies' advance halted and the entire attack in jeopardy, Jones led an unsuccessful charge up a small gully to try to regain the initiative. Three of his men, his adjutant Captain Wood, A Company's second-in-command Captain Dent, and Corporal Hardman, were killed when they followed his charge. Shortly after that, Jones was seen to run west along the base of Darwin Ridge to a small re-entrant, followed by his bodyguard. He checked his Sterling submachine gun, then ran up the hill towards an Argentine trench. He was seen to be hit once, then fell, got up, and was hit again from the side. He fell metres short of the trench, shot in the back and the groin, and died within minutes. (Note: According to Dan Snow and Peter Snow, "The Argentine corporal in that trench, Osvaldo Olmos, remembers seeing Jones charge past him alone, leaving his followers in the gully below. Olmos said he was astonished at Jones's reckless bravery: his shots, fired from behind, may have been the ones that brought Jones down.")

As Jones lay dying, his men radioed for urgent casualty evacuation. However, the British Scout helicopter sent to evacuate Jones was shot down by an Argentine FMA IA 58 Pucará ground-attack aircraft (this was to be the only Argentine air-to-air victory of the war). The pilot, Lieutenant Richard Nunn, was killed and posthumously received the Distinguished Flying Cross, and the aircrewman, Sergeant Bill Belcher, was severely wounded in both legs. While returning from this attack, the Pucará (A-537) crashed into Blue Mountain, and its pilot, Lieutenant Miguel Giménez, was killed. His remains were not recovered until 1986 and the cause of the crash remains unknown.

Jones' death was attributed to an Argentine Army commando sniper identified as Corporal Osvaldo Faustino Olmos. (Note: Olmos, of 25IR, had refused to leave his foxhole and his section fired at Jones and the five paratroopers who accompanied him as he moved forward."Without telling anyone or looking back, he ran up the gully that Corporal Adams had attacked when A Company was first fired upon, past the seriously wounded Private Tuffen. Sergeant Barry Norman, his close escort, was the first to move, followed by Lance Corporal Beresford, who was part of his escort and had been Jones's driver, Major Rice, and two signallers. Jones advanced up a small re-entrant toward a trench, which Corporal Osvaldo Olmos, from Estevez's platoon, later claimed was held by his group.") However, historian Hugh Bicheno attributed Jones' death to Corporal José Luis Ríos of the 12th Regiment's Reconnaissance Platoon that had fallen back from the earlier fighting in Darwin Parks. Ríos was later fatally wounded manning a machine-gun in his trench by Abols, who fired a 66 mm rocket. (Note: "...Lance Corporal Jose Luis Rios shot Lt Col H Jones as he charged up a re-entrant gulley on the hill above Darwin, only to be killed minutes later when Corporal Dave Abols fired a 66mm anti-tank rocket into his bunker.")

With the death of Jones, command passed to Keeble. Following the failure of this initial attack and the death of Jones, it took Keeble an additional two hours to reorganize and resume the attack. Former para officer and military theorist Spencer Fitz-Gibbon wrote in 1995 that despite his undoubted courage, Jones did more to hinder than to help 2 PARA, losing sight of the overall battle picture and failing to allow his sub-unit commanders to exercise mission command, before his fatal attempt to lead A Company forward from the position where they had become bogged down.

=== Darwin Hill ===
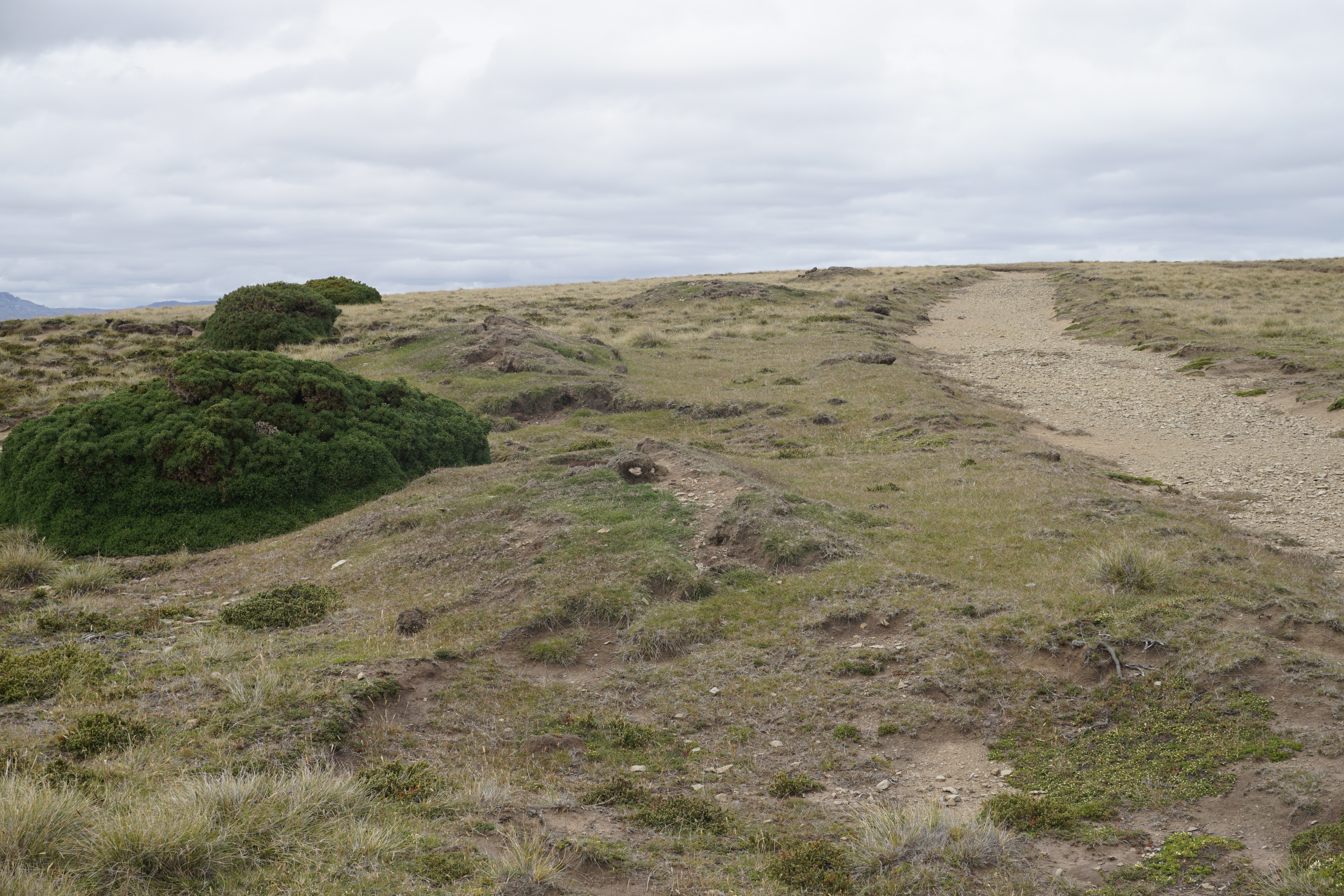
Remnants of Argentine defensive positions along gorse hedge on Darwin Hill

By 10:30 and following the death of Lieutenant Colonel Jones, Major Dair Farrar-Hockley's A Company launched a third attempt to advance. However, this effort also faltered. The British troops, hindered by dense morning fog as they moved up the slope of Darwin Ridge, were driven back into the gully by fire from surviving elements of the 1st Platoon from RI 25's C Company. During the engagement, 2 PARA's mortar teams fired more than 1,000 rounds in support of the assaults, effectively suppressing in great part Argentine fire and contributing significantly to the enemy's casualties, many of which were caused by shrapnel. (Note: "Nevertheless, the section's two mortar crews had fired over 1,000 bombs in the two hours of the A Company action, the mortars recoil driving them further and further into the soft peat.") (Note: "Some of [the Argentine dead] seemed to be looking at us, their dead eyes full of reproach. Few looked peaceful. Some had died trying to escape back into the foxholes they'd poured from. Many had fallen to the pinpoint shower of mortar shells that had dropped on them.")

The Argentines requested close air-support and were expecting a strike by 12 Argentine Air Force Skyhawks and four Dagger fighter-bombers in support of the Darwin Ridge defenders. The 12th Regiment's A Company Sergeant-Major, Juan Coelho, spread out white bedsheets in front of the trenches to mark the front line of Argentine troops but was severely wounded in the process. (Note: "It is worth highlighting the actions of First Sergeant Juan Carlos Coelho of the 12th Regiment, who, upon learning at the command post that an Argentine air raid was imminent, volunteered to go forward and mark the forwardmost friendly line with bedsheets, sacks, etc., to clarify the target for the pilots. While carrying out this mission, he was strafed by the British and seriously wounded.")

On their approach to the islands, a flight of five Skyhawks from the first wave observed the British hospital ship SS Uganda and lost time reporting and investigating the presence of the Red Cross-marked vessel. The pilots, flying in poor weather and low on fuel, carried out a hasty bomb run which mistakenly hit Argentine positions. The Skyhawks were engaged by Argentine anti-aircraft fire, which damaged the lead aircraft. (Note: "They passed up the marked hospital ship 'Uganda and executed a turn into Darwin. Unknowingly, they made a pass over their positions, firing as they went, and were promptly repelled by their air defences. The first plane was hit but could still fly.") (Note: "1130/1150 hrs – Enemy air attack on the positions (Company A and Artillery Battery) from three directions, and in four waves, with bombs, machine guns and Beluga grenades. Our fire brings down a plane (to be confirmed).")

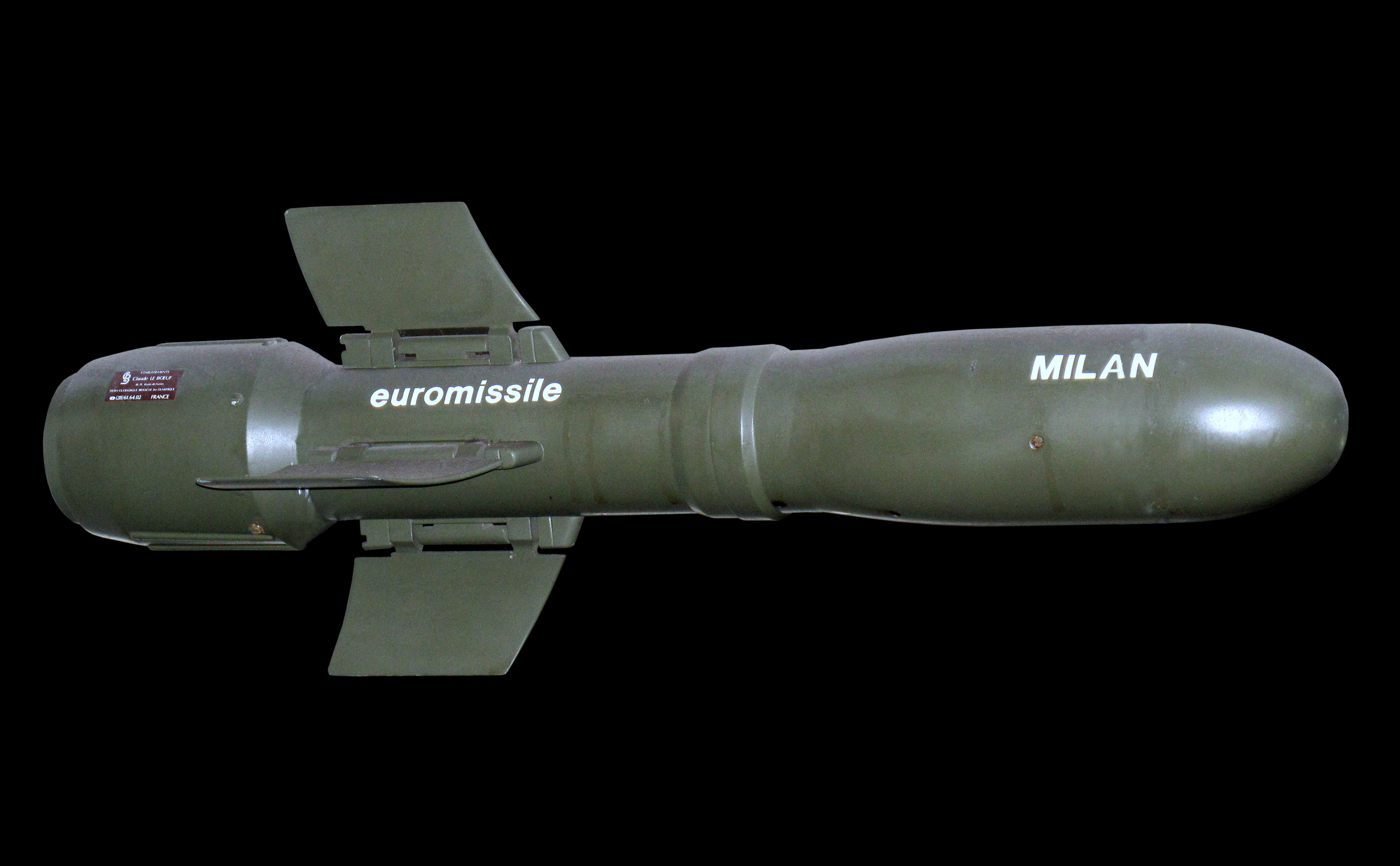
Milan missile, similar to those used in the battle by British paratroopers

The British advance resumed shortly before noon. A Company cleared the eastern half of the Argentine mainline defensive positions on Darwin Ridge, securing the route towards the settlement of Goose Green via Boca Hill, which was defended by Sub-Lieutenant Guillermo Ricardo Aliaga’s 3rd Platoon of C Company, 8th Infantry Regiment. Following intense combat, Boca Hill position was finally captured approximately half an hour later at 13:47 by Crosland’s B Company, backed by Support Company's anti-tank platoon using MILAN missiles in a direct-fire role.

About the time of the final attack on the Boca House position, A Company had earlier on overcome the Argentine defenders on Darwin Hill, reporting its capture at 13:13 local time, and advanced to take Boca Hill. (Note: "1613 Enemy have surrendered on BLACK. Now moving to WHITE.") With Second Lieutenant Estévez killed and the other two platoon commanders, Sub-Lieutenants Peluffo and Aliaga, badly wounded, Corporal Osvaldo Olmos ordered the survivors of the rifle platoon from the 25th Regiment to wave a white T-shirt tied to a rifle and surrender, ending all resistance by the Argentine forces on Darwin Ridge. (Note: "Corporal First Class Olmos assumed command of the group and said: 'We are going to surrender.' We took a white T-shirt, tied it to the end of a rifle, and one of us began waving it. It was the best decision, because continuing to fight would have meant dying. Olmos stayed behind with a loaded rifle and told us: 'You go ahead, and if they kill you, I'll take a couple of Englishmen with me.' On seeing the white flag, they approached in a crouch. At about ten metres, they shouted at us to come out. That's what we did, and they took us as prisoners.") Under the watchful eyes of their captors, the remains of Estévez’s platoon were permitted to smoke from their army-issued cigarette packs and eat their chocolate bars. (Note: "Recuerdo que en nuestras posiciones los muchachos se pusieron a fumar o comer chocolates y caramelos, embargados de una total tranquilidad y satisfacción por haberse batido como bravos." [I remember that in our positions the lads began to smoke or eat chocolate and caramels, overwhelmed with complete tranquillity and satisfaction for having fought bravely.") After securing Boca Hill, the battle for Darwin Ridge was over, and the Paras had achieved their interim objectives following six hours of intense fighting, though at grievous cost: the commanding officer, the adjutant, A Company’s second-in-command, and nine non-commissioned officers and soldiers were killed, with a further 30 wounded. (Note: "So by 11:10 am, after nearly six hours, the battle for Darwin Hill was over, but not without grievous loss: the Commanding Officer, the Adjutant, A Company Second-in-Command and nine junior non-commissioned officers and soldiers were killed and thirty wounded.") Corporal David Abols later stated that an Argentine sniper, Corporal Osvaldo Olmos, who killed or wounded seven Paras during the morning fighting, was chiefly responsible for delaying the attack. "This sniper fire was responsible for the deaths of at least seven paratroopers," said Abols, "all headshots. That is the main reason A Company was stuck."

=== Attack on the airfield ===
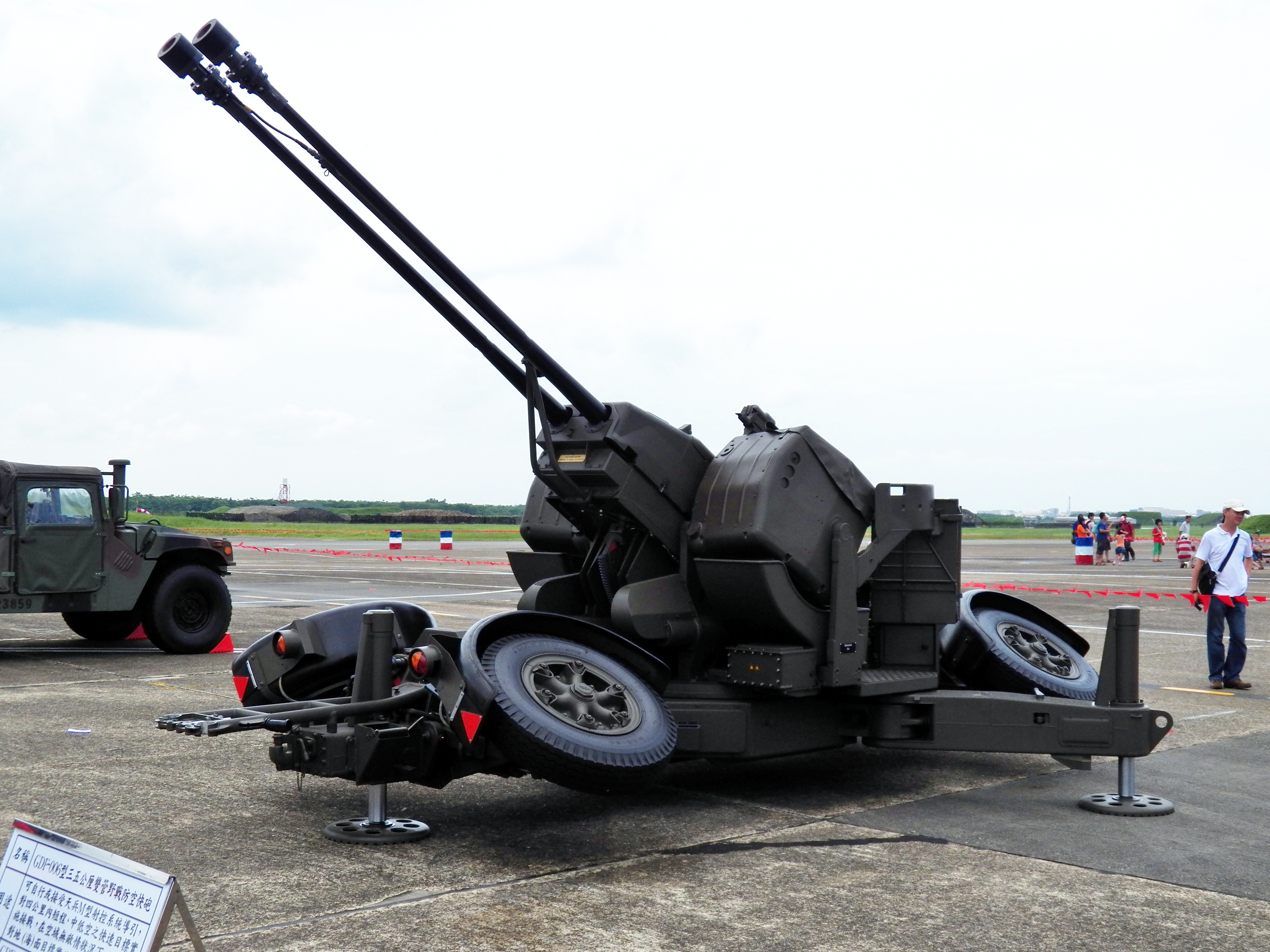
35mm Oerlikon GDF, similar to the two guns deployed by Argentine forces to defend the airfield

After securing Darwin Ridge, C Company and D Company advanced towards the airfield and Darwin School, east of the airfield, while B Company moved south of Goose Green Settlement and A Company held Darwin Hill. C Company took heavy losses after coming under intense direct fire from the 35 mm anti-aircraft guns positioned in Goose Green. Private Mark Hollman-Smith, a signaller in the company headquarters, was killed by anti-aircraft fire while attempting to recover a machine gun from the wounded Private Steve Russell. C Company's commander, Major Roger Jenner, his signaller, and eight other men were also wounded. (Note: "As the British C Company moved down the forward slope of Darwin Ridge, however, 2nd Lieutenant Braghini brought his 35mm guns into play, killing one man and wounding 11.")

On the airfield itself, Argentine Air Force anti-aircraft gunners, under Lieutenant Darío Del Valle Valazza, from the 1st Anti-Aircraft Group (Grupo 1 de Artillería Antiaérea), along with a platoon from RI 12 led by Sub-Lieutenant Carlos Aldao, attempted to halt the renewed British advance from Boca Hill. Despite their efforts, they were eventually forced to abandon their positions, including the five remaining 20mm Rheinmetall guns. One of the guns had already been lost to naval shelling, and the Elta radar destroyed by shrapnel. (Note: Three members of Grupo 1 de Artillería Antiaérea (Privates Mario Ramón Luna, Luis Guillermo Sevilla, and Héctor Walter Aguirre) were killed, along with Privates Roque Evaristo Sánchez and Avelino Néstor Oscar Pegoraro from Aldao’s platoon. Several others were wounded, including Lieutenant Valazza. Excerpted from Historia de la Fuerza Aérea Argentina (History of the Argentine Air Force), Volume VI, La Fuerza Aérea en Malvinas (The Air Force in the Malvinas), Dirección de Estudios Históricos (Directorate of Historical Studies).)

A large portion of the RI 12 platoon was overrun and forced to surrender; however, Aldao and a corporal managed to escape amid the confusion caused by Argentine airstrikes later that afternoon. With Lieutenant Valazza wounded, command of the 1st Anti-Aircraft Group passed to Second Lieutenant Arnaldo Favre, who ordered the destruction of the remaining anti-aircraft guns with hand grenades before withdrawing to Goose Green Settlement.

Lieutenant James Barry's No. 12 Platoon, D Company was ambushed by Sub-Lieutenant Juan José Gómez-Centurión's 2nd Romeo Rifle Platoon of the RI 25's C Company. Barry and two NCOs had gone forwards to accept the surrender of an Argentine position when a burst of fire from overhead wounded several Argentines. Centurion's men opened fire and killed Barry and his NCOs. Private Geordie Knight shot dead two of the attackers (Privates José Luis Allende and Ricardo Andrés Austin) that had crawled forward, (Note: "As Godfrey made his dash for the rut, Knight shot and killed two of the enemy who was skirmishing forward, and Private Carter fired coolly and continuously into the nearest trench.") and then reported the events to Major Neame. (Note: According to historian Mark Adkin, both Lance-Corporal Nigel Smith and Corporal Paul Sullivan were killed fighting: "Lance Corporal Smith aimed his 66mm rocket, but as he did so he was shot at the moment of firing. The rocket exploded in a flash of flame on his back; he died instantly. In the general confusion, Corporal Sullivan was also hit and killed.") Private Graham Carter from No. 12 Platoon described the airfield action:

In the first volley of shots, Mr Barry was hit quite badly and got tangled in the barbed wire fence. They then used him as target practice. In the same instance, [Corporal] Paul Sullivan got hit directly behind me in the knee, and then he got hit several more times in the head. I was really lucky, as with two others I was protected by a small scoop in the ground. The other gunner, Brummy [Private Brummie Mountford], got hit directly after the first volley of shots, ricochets off the GPMG, which hit him in the shoulder and the back, so he was in quite a bad way. Smudge [Lance-Corporal Nigel Smith], our section 2ic, fired a 66 mm into the trenches that were giving us trouble, but it must have been damaged in some way as the whole thing went off and damaged him badly in the face and chest. As he was only a few feet away, I went across to administer first aid to him, but as I moved, I got a bullet in my helmet, which took a chunk of it away. There was no way I was going to try going across there again.

Private John Graham, of Lieutenant Chris Waddington's No. 11 Platoon, later claimed that Lieutenant Barry and Corporal Sullivan had advanced under a local truce to accept the Argentine surrender at the airfield. According to Graham, the Argentine defenders opened fire without warning, killing Barry and wounding Sullivan, before an Argentine soldier crawled forward and shot Sullivan at close range.

... I saw the white flag incident; I was in 11 Platoon. We were going up the hill, and the flag went up. The officer [Barry] called the sergeant [sic] and then got halfway up the hill. Bang! They let rip into them, Killed them. One guy [Corporal Paul Sullivan] was hit in the knee, and one of the bastards came forward and shot him in the head. He moved forward out of his position and shot him.

According to Sub-Lieutenant Gómez-Centurión:

I set out with thirty-six men toward the north. Passing the school, we entered a depression from which we saw the hill. I sent a scouting party ahead, and they told me that the British were advancing from the other side of the low ridge, some one hundred and fifty men. [My] men were very tense; there was a brutal cold; we shivered with cold, with fear. When they were about fifty metres away, we opened fire. We kept firing for at least forty minutes. They started to attack our flank, my soldiers had to take cover, the firing went down, and the situation started to become critical. Then we were surrounded, we had wounded, people started to lose control. I began to ask about casualties, each time, more casualties. There was no way out behind because we had been flanked, nearly surrounded. So when there was a pause in the firing, I decided that it was the time to stop, and I gave the order to disengage.

Sergeant John Meredith as second-in-command of No. 12 Platoon conducted a counterambush, saving the lives of five of his men pinned down be enemy fire. The citation for his Distinguished Conduct Medal reads:

Sergeant Meredith was a Platoon Sergeant in D Company 2nd Battalion The Parachute Regiment during the 24 days of the Falkland Islands campaign. He was a dedicated and devoted leader, encouraging and steadying the younger soldiers under fire and inspiring the Platoon by his personal example. In the battle for Port Darwin and Goose Green on 28th/29th May 1982, during the later stages of a long and demanding day, his platoon commander was killed while advancing on an enemy position which it was assumed had surrendered. Five men, including one wounded, survived in the platoon commander's party but were in a perilous and exposed position. With conspicuous gallantry and presence of mind, Sergeant Meredith rapidly assumed command of the platoon, organised covering fire for the trapped men and stabilised the situation. He then personally took a machine gun and moved forward under heavy enemy fire to where he could neutralise the remainder of the enemy and give directions to extricate the trapped men. Subsequently the Platoon under his direction captured the enemy position.

The RI 25 platoon defending the airfield fell back into the Darwin-Goose Green track and was able to escape. Sergeant Sergio Garcia of 25IR armed with a machine-gun, single-handedly covered the withdrawal of his platoon during the British counterattack. He was posthumously awarded the Argentine Nation to the Valour in Combat Medal. Under orders from Major Carlos Alberto Frontera (second in command of RI 12), Sub-Lieutenant César Álvarez Berro's RI 12 platoon took up new positions and helped cover the retreat of Gómez-Centurión's platoon still dragging their wounded along the Darwin-Goose Green track.

Four Paras of D Company and approximately a ten Argentines were killed in these engagements. Among the British dead were 29-year-old Lieutenant Barry and two NCOs, Lance-Corporal Smith and Corporal Sullivan, who were killed after Barry’s attempt to convince Sub-Lieutenant Juan Centuriónto surrender was disregarded. (Note: "The newspapers inevitably made much of this, however, both sides agreed that this was a tragic misunderstanding. The Argentines later claimed that when Barry offered Second Lieutenant Centurión terms, he replied, 'Son of a bitch! You have got two minutes to return to your lines before I open fire. Get out!') C Company did not lose anyone in the school fighting, but Private Steve Dixon of D Company was killed by an anti-aircraft or field artillery fire.

The Argentine 35 mm guns, under the command of Sub-Lieutenant Claudio Braghini, reduced the schoolhouse to rubble after reports of sniper fire coming from the building. (Note: "Observé por el visor y confirmé la Presencia de Los ingleses. Apunté a la base de la estructura de dos pisos y abrí el Fuego. Pedazos completos de Ella desaparecieron al Hacer Impacto Los proyectiles y se incendió luego." ["I looked through the viewer and confirmed the presence of the English. I aimed at the base of the two-storey structure and opened fire. Whole pieces of it disappeared upon being hit by the projectiles and then it caught fire.])

At around this time, three British Harriers attacked the Argentine 35 mm gun positions on Burntside Hill, radar-guided guns were unable to respond effectively because shrapnel had earlier struck the generator for the weapons and associated fire-control radar. Although it was not known at the time, the Harrier strike missed their intended target, but the Argentine antiaircraft guns were already out of action anyway.

The attacking Harriers came close to being shot down in their bomb run after being misidentified as enemy aircraft by Lieutenant-Commander Nigel Ward, Lieutenant Stephen Thomas and Flight Lieutenant Ian Mortimer of 801 Squadron. (Note: "I had convinced myself that the three were enemy aircraft. But I also knew that Morts, more than anybody, should be able to recognise a GR 3 even from this height and range. I called the control ship, HMS Minerva. 'Do you have any friendlies in the area at a low level?' If there were any, Minerva would know about it. 'Negative. No friendlies in the Sound.' Just at that moment of distraction, I lost sight of the three swept-wing shapes below. They disappeared into the multi-coloured background of the water. 'I've lost the fucking things, Morts. do you hold them?' 'Negative. But I'm sure they were GR 3s.' I was mad as a hatter and wasn't thinking straight. I was tired, and 'missing' the enemy jets seemed to drain me of all energy. If I hadn't been so tired, I might have considered the line 'better safe than sorry,' but I was in no mood for that when I landed on board. The debrief was short and to the point: 'GR 3s, my arse! '" Sea Harrier Over the Falklands, Nigel Ward, p. 227, Pen and Sword, 1993)

Meanwhile, the RI 12 platoon—under Sub-Lieutenant Orlando Lucero, a unit that Piaggi and Carlos Frontera had personally organised using survivors from the earlier fighting—took up positions in and around some metal sheep-shearing sheds on the outskirts of Goose Green and continued to resist. Supporting air force Pucará and navy Aermacchi aircraft also struck the forward British companies. The Argentine pilots had little effect and suffered two losses: at 17:00, a MB-339A of CANA 1 Squadron was shot down by a Blowpipe missile launched by the Royal Marines' air defence troop, killing Sub-Lieutenant Daniel Miguel. About ten minutes later, an Argentine Pucará, was shot down by small arms fire, drenching several paratroopers with fuel and napalm, though it did not ignite. (Note: "One aircraft crashed close by, drenching several men with fuel and napalm, which happily did not ignite.") Lieutenant Miguel Cruzado survived the crash and was captured by British forces on the ground.

=== Situation at last light on 28 May ===
By last light, the situation for 2 PARA was critical. A Company was still on Darwin Hill, north of the gorse hedge; B Company had penetrated much further south and had swung in a wide arc from the western shore of the isthmus eastwards towards Goose Green. They were isolated and under fire from an Argentinian platoon and unable to receive mutual support from the other companies. To worsen their predicament, Argentine helicopters—a Puma, a Chinook and six Hueys—landed southwest of their position, just after last light, bringing in the remaining Company B of 12IR (Combat Team Solari) from Mount Kent.

B Company managed to bring in artillery fire on these new Argentine reinforcements, forcing them to disperse towards the Goose Green settlement, while some re-embarked and left with the departing helicopters. For C Company, the attack had also fizzled out after the battle at the school-house, with the company commander injured, the second-in-command unaccounted for, no radio contact, and the platoons scattered with up to 1,200 metres between them. D Company had regrouped just before last light, and they were deployed to the west of the dairy—exhausted, hungry, low on ammunition, and without water. Food was redistributed, for A and C Companies to share one ration-pack between two men; but B and D Companies could not be reached. At this time, a British helicopter casualty evacuation flight took place, successfully extracting C Company casualties from the forward slope of Darwin Hill, while under fire from Argentine positions. During the night, another British Sea King helicopter (ZA 292) piloted by Lieutenant Nigel North was attempting to evacuate the wounded on Darwin Hill when it came under long-range machine-gun fire from the outskirts of Goose Green and was forced to retire to San Carlos for repairs after being hit near the gear box.

To Keeble, the situation looked precarious: the settlements had been surrounded but not captured, and his companies were exhausted, cold, and low on water, food, and ammunition. His concern was that the Argentine 12IR B Company reinforcements, dropped by helicopter, would either be used in an early morning counter-attack or used to stiffen the defences around Goose Green. He had seen the C Company assault stopped in its tracks by the anti-aircraft fire from Goose Green, and had seen the Harrier strikes of earlier that afternoon missing their intended targets. In an order group with the A and C Company commanders, he indicated his preference for calling for an Argentine surrender, rather than facing an ongoing battle the following morning. His alternative plan, if the Argentines did not surrender, was to "flatten Goose Green" with all available fire-power and then launch an assault with all forces possible, including reinforcements he had requested from Thompson. On Thompson's orders, J Company of 42 Commando, Royal Marines, the remaining guns of 8 Battery, and additional mortars were helicoptered in to provide the necessary support.

=== Surrender ===
Once Thompson and 3 Brigade had agreed to the approach, a message was relayed by CB radio from San Carlos to Mr. Eric Goss, the farm manager in Goose Green—who, in turn, delivered it to Piaggi. The call explained the details of a planned delegation who would go forward from the British lines, bearing a message, to the Argentine positions in Goose Green. Piaggi agreed to receive the delegation. Soon after midnight, two Argentine Air Force warrant-officer prisoners of war (PW) were sent to meet with Piaggi and to hand over the proposed terms of surrender. Taking advantage of the local ceasefire, Second Lieutenant Juan Gómez Centurión—at the head of two air force stretcher-bearers, Privates David Alejandro Díaz and Reynaldo Dardo Romacho and an accompanying air force medical officer, Lieutenant Carlos Beranek—found and rescued Corporal Juan Fernández who had been severely wounded and left behind British lines. Keeble's conditions read:

1. That you unconditionally surrender your force to us by leaving the township, forming up aggressively, removing your helmets, and laying down your weapons. You will give prior notice of this intention by returning the PW under a white flag with him briefed as to the formalities by no later than 0830 hrs local time.
2. You refuse in the first case to surrender and take the inevitable consequences. You will give prior notice of this intention by returning the PW without his flag (although his neutrality will be respected) no later than 0830 hrs local time.
3. In the event and by the terms and conditions of the Geneva Convention and Laws of War, you will be held responsible for the fate of any civilians in Darwin and Goose Green, and we by these terms do give notice of our intention to bombard Darwin and Goose Green.

On receiving the terms, Piaggi concluded:

The battle had turned into a sniping contest. They could sit well out of range of our soldiers' fire and, if they wanted to, raze the settlement. I knew that there was no longer any chance of reinforcements from the 6th Regiment's B Company (Compañía B 'Piribebuy'). So I suggested to Wing Commander [Vice Commodore] Wilson Pedrozo that he talk to the British. He agreed reluctantly.

The next morning, an agreement for an unconditional surrender was reached. Pedrozo held a short parade, and those on show then laid down their weapons. To the surprise of the paratroopers at least 1,500 Argentines filed out to lay down their arms. After burning the regimental flag, Piaggi led the troops and officers, carrying their personal belongings, into captivity.

== Aftermath ==
=== Impact on the campaign ===
In the week preceding the attack, the Argentinians had sunk four British ships, including Atlantic Conveyor containing vital air-lift helicopters essential for the re-capture of Stanley. This led the British government to question the lack of movement by their ground-forces and London needed a sign of progress. The victory at Goose Green accomplished the political purpose of sustaining public support in Britain by a badly needed victory and the success marked a turning point in the campaign, as it emphasised the Argentine failure to thwart the establishment of a beachhead and subsequent breakout into the island. The Argentines had counted on achieving at least a stalemate through air attacks and ground defences, if not stopping the landings altogether. From this point onwards, the British forces retained the initiative in all successive battles.

=== Prisoners and casualties ===
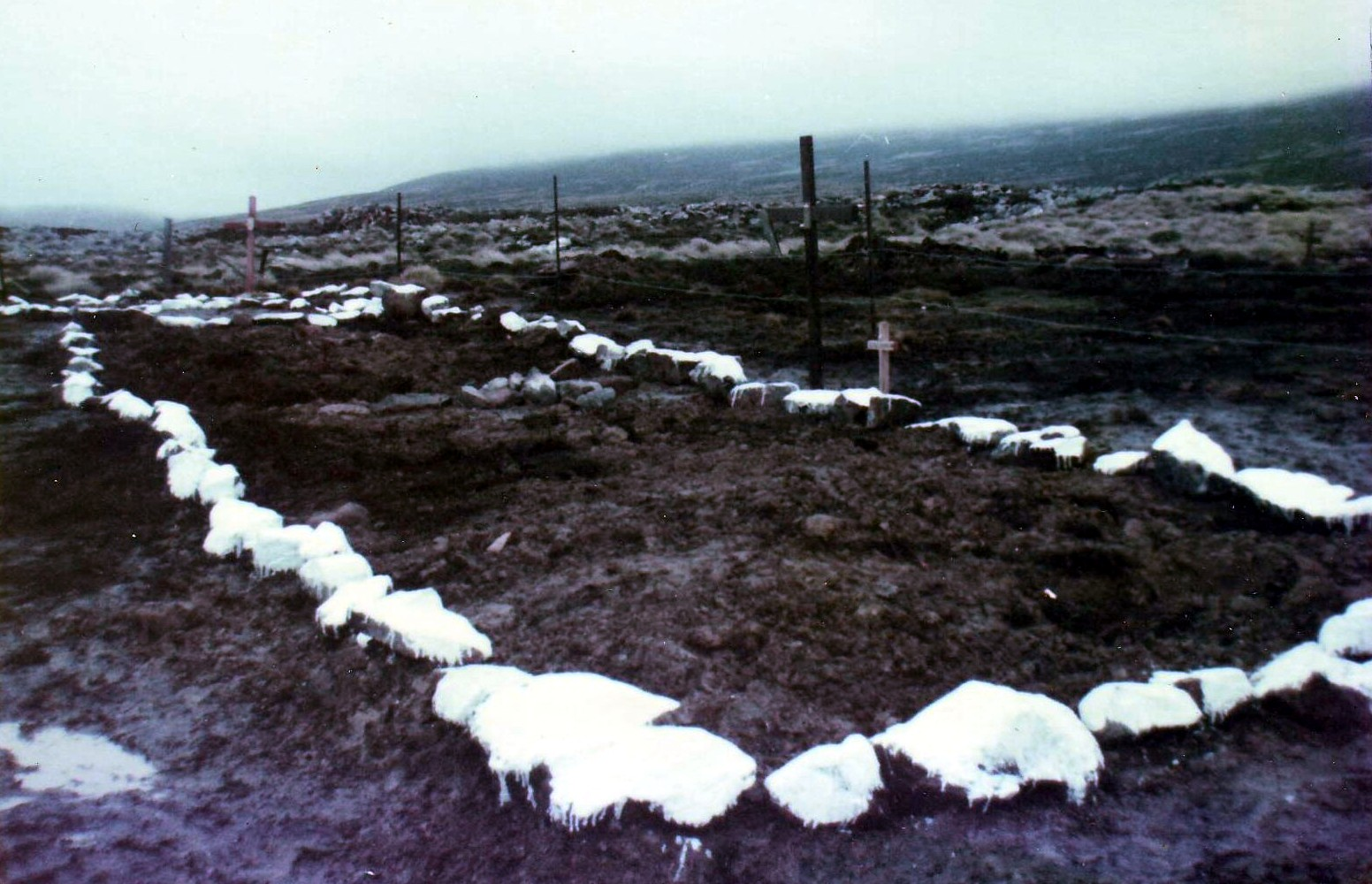
Initial burial place of British casualties at Ajax Bay

Between 45 and 55 Argentines were killed (57 according to Major Alberto Frontera, second-in-command of the 12th Regiment) with 32 from RI 12, 13 from Company C RI 25, five killed in the platoon from RI 8, 4 Air Force staff, and one Navy service member, and 86 were recorded as wounded. Some 961 members of the Argentine force were taken prisoner. Around 1,000prisoners of war were evacuated to the Norland hospital ship via the medical post in San Carlos with another 140 Argentine wounded transferred to the Uganda hospital ship.The Argentine dead were buried in a cemetery to the north of Darwin; military chaplain Mora and sub-lieutenants Bracco and Gómez-Centurión assisted burying the army dead with Second Lieutenant Arnaldo Favre from the 1st Anti-Aircraft Artillery Group tasked with collecting the air force dead. Prisoners were used to clear the battlefield. In an incident, while moving artillery ammunition, the 2nd Rifle Platoon (under Sub-Lieutenant Leonardo Durán) from RI 12's C Company was engulfed in a massive explosion that reportedly left 5 dead or missing and 10 seriously wounded. In an interview in April 2022, Durán clarified that the actual losses in the explosion were three men (Privates Rafael Barrios, Víctor Rodríguez and José Ramón Ferrau) killed and ten men (the officer along with Privates Raúl Vallejos, Ricardo Pinatti, Ángel Urban, Ricardo Jakuisuk, Gerardo Fernández, Luis Spinberger, Hugo Duarte, Francisco Ocampo and Martín Flores) wounded in his platoon. After clearing the area, the prisoners were marched to, and interned in, San Carlos before boarding the Norland for repatriation back to Argentina.

The British lost 18 killed (16 paras, one Royal Marine pilot, and one commando sapper) and 33 paras and one Royal Marine were wounded according to British intelligence officer Nicolas Van der Bijl. According to Professor Lawrence Freedman, author of The Official History of the Falklands Campaign, 2 PARA suffered 36 seriously wounded requiring urgent evacuation with another 30 or so suffering less serious wounds.

=== Commanders ===
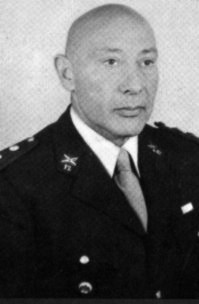
Lieutenant-Colonel Ítalo Ángel Piaggi

Piaggi surrendered his forces in Goose Green on the Argentinian National Army Day (29 May). After the war, he was forced to resign from the army, and faced ongoing trials questioning his competence at Goose Green. In 1986, he wrote a book titled Ganso Verde, in which he strongly defended his decisions during the war and criticised the lack of logistical support from Stanley. In his book, he said that Task Force Mercedes had plenty of 7.62 mm rifle ammunition left, but had run out of 81 mm mortar rounds; and there were only 394 shells left for the 105 mm artillery guns. On 24 February 1992, after a long fight in both civil and military courts, Piaggi had his retired military rank and pay as a full colonel reinstated. He died in July 2012.

Jones was buried at Ajax Bay on 30 May; after the war, his body was exhumed and transferred to the British cemetery in San Carlos. He was posthumously awarded the Victoria Cross.

Keeble, who took over command of 2 PARA when Jones was killed, was awarded the Distinguished Service Order for his actions at Goose Green. Keeble's leadership was one of the key factors that led to the British victory, in that his flexible style of command and the autonomy he afforded to his company commanders were much more successful than the rigid control, and adherence to plan, exercised by Jones. He was superseded by Lieutenant-Colonel David Robert Chaundler, who was flown in from the UK and parachuted into the sea.

== Awards and citations ==
=== Argentine forces ===
- La Nación Argentina al Heroico Valor en Combate, the highest Argentine military decoration, was awarded to:
  - Lieutenant Roberto Nestor Estévez †,
- La Nación Argentina al Valor en Combate, the second highest Argentine military decoration, was awarded to:
  - Sub-Lieutenant Ernesto Orlando Peluffo
  - Sergeant-Major Juan Carlos Coelho
  - Sergeant Sergio Ismael García †
  - Corporal Mario Rodolfo Castro †
  - Private 63 Class Fabricio Edgar Carrascull †
  - Private 63 Class Roque Evaristo Sanchez †
  - Private 63 Class Avelino Nestor Oscar Pegoraro †

=== British forces ===
- The Victoria Cross was posthumously awarded to Lieutenant-Colonel Herbert 'H' Jones †.
- The Distinguished Service Order was awarded to Major Chris Keeble.
- The Military Cross was awarded to:
  - Major John Crosland,
  - Major Charles Farrar-Hockley, and
  - Lieutenant Colin Connor.
- The Distinguished Flying Cross was awarded to:
  - Captain John Greenhalgh,
  - Captain Jeffrey Niblett, and
  - Lieutenant Richard Nunn †.
- The Distinguished Conduct Medal was awarded to:
  - Corporal David Abols,
  - Sergeant John Meredith, and
  - Private Stephen Illingsworth †.
- The Military Medal was awarded to:
  - Lance Corporal Stephen Bardsley,
  - Sergeant Ted Barrett,
  - Lance Corporal Gary Bingley †,
  - Lance Corporal Martin Bentley,
  - Private Graham Carter,
  - Corporal Thomas Camp,
  - Private Barry Grayling,
  - Corporal Thomas Harley, and
  - Lance Corporal Leslie Standish
- Mentioned in Despatches: Staff Sergeant Ian Aird, Private Simon Alexander, Private Andrew Brooke, Lance Corporal Neal Dance, Lance Corporal Kevin Dunbar, Captain Paul Farrar, Major Patrick Gullan, Private Mark Fletcher †, Corporal David Hardman †, Lieutenant Clive Livingstone, Private Andrew Mansfield, Lieutenant Maldwyn Worsley-Tonks, Lieutenant Guy Wallis, and Lieutenant Geoffrey Weighell.
- Member of the Order of the British Empire: Robert Fox.

== Order of battle ==
=== Argentine forces ===
Below data is from Adkin, Goose Green: A Battle is Fought to be Won unless specifically indicated by additional citations.

Formation	Unit / company / squadron	Platoon / troop
Airforce Element: Cóndor Air Base; O.C: Vice Commodore Pedrosa	Grupo 1 de Artillería Antiaérea (1st Grp AA Art.); Lieutenant Darío Valazza	Elta radar and 6x twin-20mm Rheinmetall
Airforce Element: Cóndor Air Base; O.C: Vice Commodore Pedrosa	Training Command: Security Company, School of Military Aviation; 1st Lt Carlos Daniel Esteban	
Task Force Mercedes; O.C. Lieutenant-Colonel Ítalo Piaggi	A Company (-) IR12; 1st Lieutenant Jorge Antonio Manresa	1 Platoon: Lieutenant Alejandro José Garra
Task Force Mercedes; O.C. Lieutenant-Colonel Ítalo Piaggi	A Company (-) IR12; 1st Lieutenant Jorge Antonio Manresa	2 Platoon: Sub-Lieutenant Gustavo Adolfo Malacalza
Task Force Mercedes; O.C. Lieutenant-Colonel Ítalo Piaggi	A Company (-) IR12; 1st Lieutenant Jorge Antonio Manresa	3 Platoon Sub-Lieutenant Marcelo Martin Bracco<
Task Force Mercedes; O.C. Lieutenant-Colonel Ítalo Piaggi	A Company (-) IR12; 1st Lieutenant Jorge Antonio Manresa	Admin "scratch" Platoon: Sub-Lieutenant Ernesto Peluffo
Task Force Mercedes; O.C. Lieutenant-Colonel Ítalo Piaggi	A Company (-) IR12; 1st Lieutenant Jorge Antonio Manresa	3 Platoon: 2nd Lieutenant Guillermo Ricardo Aliaga, C Coy, IR8 (under A Coy command)
Task Force Mercedes; O.C. Lieutenant-Colonel Ítalo Piaggi	B Company IR12 (Combat Team Solari) (arrived from Mount Kent as reinforcements under Captain Eduardo Néstor Corsiglia at approx 16:00)	1 Platoon Sub-Lieutenant Daniel Fernando Benítez)
Task Force Mercedes; O.C. Lieutenant-Colonel Ítalo Piaggi	B Company IR12 (Combat Team Solari) (arrived from Mount Kent as reinforcements under Captain Eduardo Néstor Corsiglia at approx 16:00)	2 Platoon (Sub-Lieutenant Carlos Francisco Tamini)
Task Force Mercedes; O.C. Lieutenant-Colonel Ítalo Piaggi	B Company IR12 (Combat Team Solari) (arrived from Mount Kent as reinforcements under Captain Eduardo Néstor Corsiglia at approx 16:00)	3 Platoon (Sub-Lieutenant Ramón Antonio de Jesús Cañete)
Task Force Mercedes; O.C. Lieutenant-Colonel Ítalo Piaggi	C Company IR12; 1st Lieutenant Ramón Duaso Fernández	Heavy Weapons Platoon: Lieutenant Carlos María Marturet
Task Force Mercedes; O.C. Lieutenant-Colonel Ítalo Piaggi	C Company IR12; 1st Lieutenant Ramón Duaso Fernández	1 Platoon: Sub-Lieutenant Carlos Osvaldo Aldao
Task Force Mercedes; O.C. Lieutenant-Colonel Ítalo Piaggi	C Company IR12; 1st Lieutenant Ramón Duaso Fernández	2 Platoon: 2nd Lieutenant Leonardo Duran
Task Force Mercedes; O.C. Lieutenant-Colonel Ítalo Piaggi	C Company IR25 (Group Gűemes); 1st Lt Carlos Daniel Esteban	1 Platoon: Lieutenant Roberto Estévez †
Task Force Mercedes; O.C. Lieutenant-Colonel Ítalo Piaggi	C Company IR25 (Group Gűemes); 1st Lt Carlos Daniel Esteban	2 Platoon: Sub-Lieutenant Juan José Gómez-Centurión
Task Force Mercedes; O.C. Lieutenant-Colonel Ítalo Piaggi	C Company IR25 (Group Gűemes); 1st Lt Carlos Daniel Esteban	Heavy Weapons Platoon: Sub-Lieutenant José Alberto Vázques (arrived as reinforcements at approx 11:00)
Task Force Mercedes; O.C. Lieutenant-Colonel Ítalo Piaggi	GAA 4: 1x Trp from A Battery, 4th Airborne Arty. Regt; Lt Carlos Alberto Chanampa	(Half battery) 3x 105mm Pack Howitzer
Task Force Mercedes; O.C. Lieutenant-Colonel Ítalo Piaggi	GADA 601 Bty: 2nd Sec, B-Battery; 2nd Lieutenant Claudio Oscar Braghini	Skyguard radar and 2x 35mm Oerlikon; Detachment 602 EW Company
Task Force Mercedes; O.C. Lieutenant-Colonel Ítalo Piaggi	9th Engineer Company Gpo Ing/Ca Ing	
Coast Guard Element

=== British forces ===
Below data is from Adkin, Goose Green: A Battle is Fought to be Won unless specifically indicated by additional citations. Post-nominal letters refer to awards bestowed for actions during the Battle of Goose Green.

Regiment	Company / Squadron	Platoon / Troop
2 Battalion, Parachute Regiment Battle Group; O.C. Lieutenant Colonel H. Jones † VC; 2 I.C: Major C.P.B. Keeble DSO	HQ Company 2 PARA; Major Mike Ryan	Quartermaster Section: Captain Godwin
2 Battalion, Parachute Regiment Battle Group; O.C. Lieutenant Colonel H. Jones † VC; 2 I.C: Major C.P.B. Keeble DSO	HQ Company 2 PARA; Major Mike Ryan	Signals Platoon: Captain David Benest
2 Battalion, Parachute Regiment Battle Group; O.C. Lieutenant Colonel H. Jones † VC; 2 I.C: Major C.P.B. Keeble DSO	HQ Company 2 PARA; Major Mike Ryan	MT Platoon: Colour Sergeant Caldwell (was used as defence platoon)
2 Battalion, Parachute Regiment Battle Group; O.C. Lieutenant Colonel H. Jones † VC; 2 I.C: Major C.P.B. Keeble DSO	HQ Company 2 PARA; Major Mike Ryan	Regt. Aid Post: Captain Hughes
2 Battalion, Parachute Regiment Battle Group; O.C. Lieutenant Colonel H. Jones † VC; 2 I.C: Major C.P.B. Keeble DSO	A Company 2 PARA; Major C.D. Farrar-Hockley MC	1 Platoon: Sergeant T.I. Barrett MM
2 Battalion, Parachute Regiment Battle Group; O.C. Lieutenant Colonel H. Jones † VC; 2 I.C: Major C.P.B. Keeble DSO	A Company 2 PARA; Major C.D. Farrar-Hockley MC	2 Platoon: 2nd Lieutenant M. Coe
2 Battalion, Parachute Regiment Battle Group; O.C. Lieutenant Colonel H. Jones † VC; 2 I.C: Major C.P.B. Keeble DSO	A Company 2 PARA; Major C.D. Farrar-Hockley MC	3 Platoon: 2nd Lieutenant Guy Walls
2 Battalion, Parachute Regiment Battle Group; O.C. Lieutenant Colonel H. Jones † VC; 2 I.C: Major C.P.B. Keeble DSO	B Company 2 PARA; Major J.H. Crosland M C	4 Platoon: Lieutenant Hocking
2 Battalion, Parachute Regiment Battle Group; O.C. Lieutenant Colonel H. Jones † VC; 2 I.C: Major C.P.B. Keeble DSO	B Company 2 PARA; Major J.H. Crosland M C	5 Platoon: Lieutenant Weighall
2 Battalion, Parachute Regiment Battle Group; O.C. Lieutenant Colonel H. Jones † VC; 2 I.C: Major C.P.B. Keeble DSO	B Company 2 PARA; Major J.H. Crosland M C	6 Platoon: Lieutenant Clive Chapman
2 Battalion, Parachute Regiment Battle Group; O.C. Lieutenant Colonel H. Jones † VC; 2 I.C: Major C.P.B. Keeble DSO	C Company 2 PARA; Major Roger Jenner	Patrols Platoon: Captain Farrar
2 Battalion, Parachute Regiment Battle Group; O.C. Lieutenant Colonel H. Jones † VC; 2 I.C: Major C.P.B. Keeble DSO	C Company 2 PARA; Major Roger Jenner	Recce Platoon: Lieutenant C.S. Connor MC
2 Battalion, Parachute Regiment Battle Group; O.C. Lieutenant Colonel H. Jones † VC; 2 I.C: Major C.P.B. Keeble DSO	D Company 2 PARA; Major Phil Neame	10 Platoon: Lieutenant Webster
2 Battalion, Parachute Regiment Battle Group; O.C. Lieutenant Colonel H. Jones † VC; 2 I.C: Major C.P.B. Keeble DSO	D Company 2 PARA; Major Phil Neame	11 Platoon: 2nd Lieutenant C. Waddington
2 Battalion, Parachute Regiment Battle Group; O.C. Lieutenant Colonel H. Jones † VC; 2 I.C: Major C.P.B. Keeble DSO	D Company 2 PARA; Major Phil Neame	12 Platoon: Lieutenant J.A. Barry †
2 Battalion, Parachute Regiment Battle Group; O.C. Lieutenant Colonel H. Jones † VC; 2 I.C: Major C.P.B. Keeble DSO	Support Company 2 PARA; Major Hugh Jenner	A/Tk Platoon: Captain Ketley
2 Battalion, Parachute Regiment Battle Group; O.C. Lieutenant Colonel H. Jones † VC; 2 I.C: Major C.P.B. Keeble DSO	Support Company 2 PARA; Major Hugh Jenner	Mortar Troop: Captain Worsley-Tonks
2 Battalion, Parachute Regiment Battle Group; O.C. Lieutenant Colonel H. Jones † VC; 2 I.C: Major C.P.B. Keeble DSO	Support Company 2 PARA; Major Hugh Jenner	Machinegun Platoon: Lieutenant Lister
2 Battalion, Parachute Regiment Battle Group; O.C. Lieutenant Colonel H. Jones † VC; 2 I.C: Major C.P.B. Keeble DSO	Support Company 2 PARA; Major Hugh Jenner	Assault Pioneer Platoon: Sergeant Bell
2 Battalion, Parachute Regiment Battle Group; O.C. Lieutenant Colonel H. Jones † VC; 2 I.C: Major C.P.B. Keeble DSO	Support Company 2 PARA; Major Hugh Jenner	Sniper Platoon: Sergeant Head
2 Battalion, Parachute Regiment Battle Group; O.C. Lieutenant Colonel H. Jones † VC; 2 I.C: Major C.P.B. Keeble DSO	Artillery Support	Art Troop: Major Anthony Rice, RA; 29 Field Battery, RA
2 Battalion, Parachute Regiment Battle Group; O.C. Lieutenant Colonel H. Jones † VC; 2 I.C: Major C.P.B. Keeble DSO	Artillery Support	Blowpipe Section: WO2 Smith, RA; 43rd Air Defence Bty, RA
2 Battalion, Parachute Regiment Battle Group; O.C. Lieutenant Colonel H. Jones † VC; 2 I.C: Major C.P.B. Keeble DSO	Engineers	Recce Troop: Lieutenant Livingston, RE; 59 Independent Commando Sqn, RE

=== Comparative strengths ===
Below data is from Adkin, Goose Green: A Battle is Fought to be Won unless specifically indicated by additional citations. Note:The Argentine strengths as with respect to 28th of May. The forces on 29th may have been between 1,118-1700.

Force strengths as at 28 May 1982.
Argentine combined forces		2nd Battalion, Parachute Regiment Battle Group	
Component	Strength	Strength	Component
Infantary Regiment 12	439	22	Battalion HQ, 2 PARA
Infantry Regiment 25, C Company	78	102	HQ Company, 2 PARA
Infantry Regiment 8, C Company, 3 Platoon	37	79	A Company, 2 PARA
		83	B Company, 2 PARA
		48	C Company, 2 PARA
		78	D Company, 2 PARA
		123	Support Company, 2 PARA
GAA 4 Arty Support	45	83	Artillery Troop, 29 Field Battery, RA
GADA 601 Bty AA	33	12	Blowpipe section, 43rd Air Defence Bty, RA
Gpo Ing/Ca Ing [Engineers]	11	20	Engineers, 59 Independent Commando Sqn, RE
Total Task Force Mercedes	643	690	Total 2 PARA Group
Airforce element: Cóndor Air Base	250		
Coast Guard element	10		
Total Argentine forces	903	690	Total British forces

== BBC incident ==
During the planning of the assault of both Darwin and Goose Green, the battalion headquarters were listening in to the BBC World Service, when the newsreader announced that the 2nd Battalion of the Parachute Regiment was poised and ready to assault Darwin and Goose Green. This caused great trepidation among the commanding officers of the battalion, with fears that the operation was compromised. Jones became furious with the level of incompetence and told BBC representative Robert Fox he was going to sue the BBC, Whitehall, and the War Cabinet.

== Field punishments ==
In the years after the battle, Argentine army officers and NCOs were accused of handing out brutal field punishment to their troops at Goose Green, and other locations, during the war. In 2009, Argentine authorities in Comodoro Rivadavia ratified a decision made by authorities in Río Grande, Tierra del Fuego, announcing their intention to charge 70 officers and NCOs with inhumane treatment of conscript soldiers during the war.

There was, however, false testimony that was used as evidence in accusing the Argentine officers and NCOs of abandonment; and Pablo Vassel, who had denounced the alleged perpetrators, had to step down from his post as head of the human rights sub-secretariat of Corrientes Province. Other high-profile veterans were sceptical about the veracity of the accusations, with Colonel José Martiniano Duarte, an ex–601 Commando Company officer and decorated veteran of the Falklands War, saying at the time that it had become "fashionable" for ex-conscripts to accuse their superiors of abandonment.

Since the 2009 announcement was made, no one in the military, or among the retired officers and NCOs, had been charged, causing Vassel to comment in April 2014:

For over two years we've been waiting for a final say on behalf of the courts ... There are some types of crimes that no state should allow to go unpunished, no matter how much time has passed, such as the crimes of the dictatorship. Last year Germany sentenced a 98-year-old corporal for his role in the concentration camps in one of the Eastern European countries occupied by Nazi Germany. It didn't take into account his age or rank.

The historic legal battle launched in 2007 by human rights advocate Pablo Vassel and the Ex-Malvinas Combatants Center (CECIM) in La Plata (Buenos Aires) is currently trapped in a nearly two decades long legal fight before the Supreme Court of Argentina, which has yet to issue a definitive final ruling.
