= Piaggi =

Piaggi is an Italian surname. Notable people with the surname include:

- Anna Piaggi (1931–2012), Italian fashion writer
- Ítalo Piaggi (1935–2012), Argentine Army commander
