= Chris Keeble =

British army officer (born 1941)

- Born: 14 November 1941 (age 84); Quetta, British India
- Military career
- Allegiance: United Kingdom
- Branch: British Army
- Service years: 1963–1987
- Rank: Lieutenant colonel
- Units: Royal Leicestershire Regiment; Royal Anglian Regiment; Parachute Regiment
- Commands: 2nd Battalion, Parachute Regiment
- Conflicts: Falklands War: Battle of Goose Green; Battle of Wireless Ridge
- Awards: Distinguished Service Order

Christopher Patrick Benedict Keeble DSO (born 14 November 1941) is a former British Army officer, who fought in the Falklands War.

== Early life ==
Keeble was born in Quetta, British India (Pakistan), and received his early formal education at the Benedictine Douai School (for both prep school at Ditcham Park and the senior school), and at the Royal Military Academy, Sandhurst.

== Military career ==
In February 1964 he received a commission into the British Army's Royal Leicestershire Regiment, which was amalgamated into The Royal Anglian Regiment seven months later. He joined the Parachute Regiment in 1972, and was promoted to major serving with 10 Para in 1975.

On 28–29 May 1982, at the Battle of Goose Green during the Falklands War, Keeble assumed command of the 2nd Battalion of The Parachute Regiment (2 PARA) after its commanding officer, Lieutenant-Colonel H. Jones, had been killed in action. A devout Christian, Keeble, then a major, took over the leadership of the battalion at a point when its attack upon the Argentine Army position had broken down, having lost 16% of its strength as casualties; it was short of ammunition, had been without sleep for 40 hours, and was in a debilitated condition to face the unknown potential of a counter-attack from the Argentine forces present in the vicinity. After kneeling alone in prayer amongst the burning gorse seeking guidance as to what to do, Keeble conceived the idea of refraining from more attacks to try a psychological ploy, subsequently releasing several captured Argentine prisoners of war in the direction of their Goose Green garrison, carrying messages into it requiring its surrender or threatening it with a fictitious large-scale assault by the British forces, supported by artillery. The Argentine commander, Lieutenant Colonel Ítalo Piaggi, subsequently surrendered the garrison to the Parachute Regiment without further fighting.

After the battle, despite popular sentiment among the soldiers of 2 PARA for him to remain in command, he was replaced by Lt. Col. David Chaundler, who was flown in from the United Kingdom to take command of the battalion. At the end of the conflict Keeble was decorated with the Distinguished Service Order.

He then commanded 15th Bn Parachute Regiment, a Territorial Army battalion based in Scotland, with its HQ in Glasgow. Keeble finished his military career with the rank of lieutenant colonel on 27 September 1987, his final appointment having been a staff officer grade 1 at Allied Forces Central Europe in the Netherlands.

== Post-military life ==
After retiring from the British Army he set up a management consultancy, providing instruction on balancing the "Ethic of business transformation with the Ethic of peoples' flourishing". He is a supernumerary fellow at Harris Manchester College, Oxford University.
