= ULSA =

ULSA or Ulsa may refer to:

- "ULSA" is an acronym for Universidad La Salle in Mexico
- Ulsa (乙巳) or Eulsa was the year corresponding to 1905 according to the traditional Korean calendar
- Ulsa treaty or "Eulsa treaty" is metonymn for the Japan–Korea Treaty of 1905
- A misspelling of ulcer
- A character in the music video 'do not hold on to it' by EdukayFUN
- Uganda Landmine Survivors Association
