= Blue Beach Military Cemetery at San Carlos =

Cemetery in the Falkland Islands

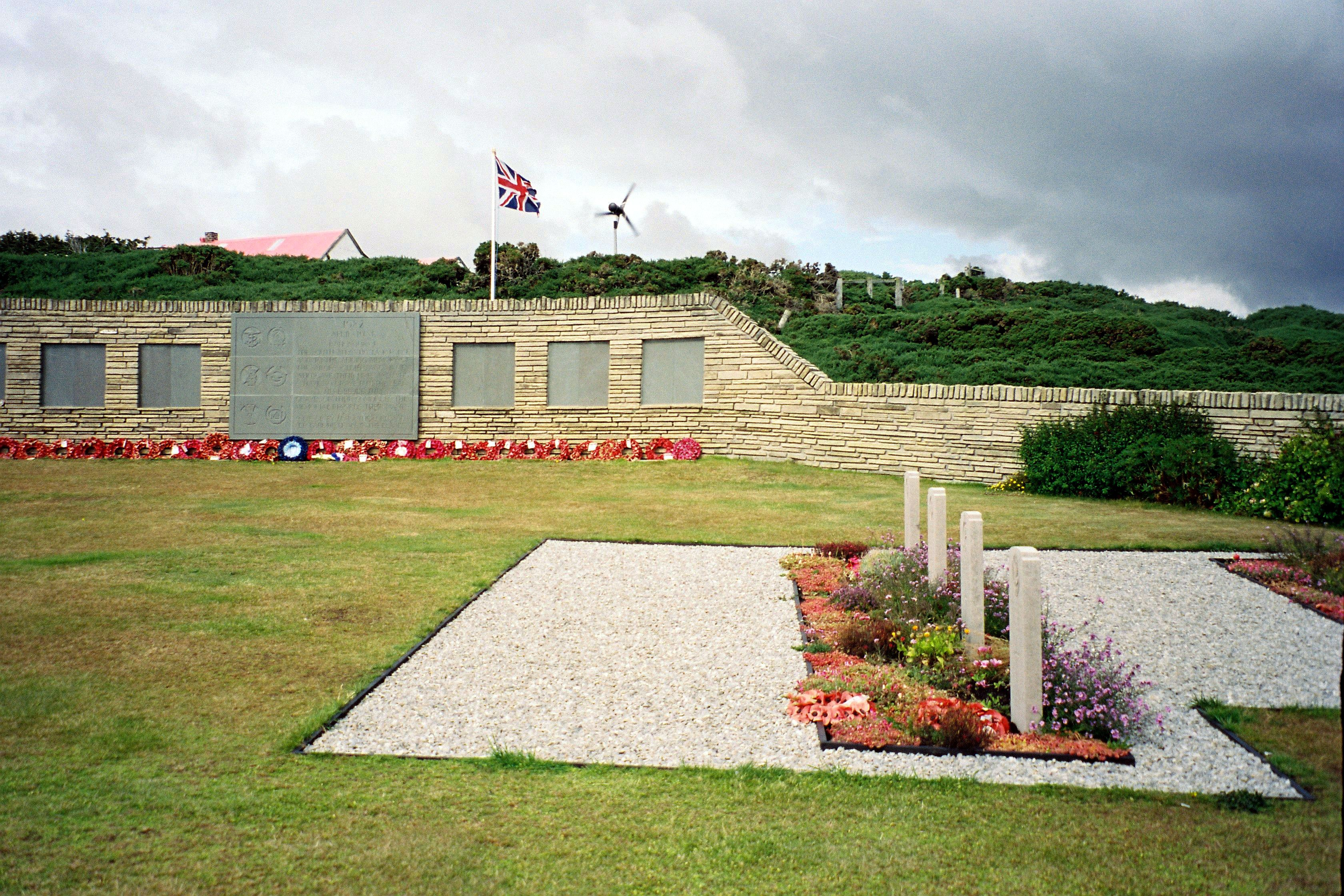
- The Cemetery in 2003
- For British forces
- Unveiled: 10 April 1983
- Location: 51°34′25.05″S 59°02′12.12″W
- Designed by: Professor Sir Peter Shepheard

Blue Beach Military Cemetery at San Carlos is a British war cemetery located in the Falkland Islands, where the remains of 14 of the 255 British servicemen who were killed during the 1982 Falklands War are buried, along with one serviceman who died in early 1984. The cemetery is situated near the site of 3 Commando Brigade's initial headquarters following their landing on 21 May 1982.

Prior to 1982, British servicemen who were killed in action were typically buried and commemorated as close as possible to the place of their death, with the Commonwealth War Graves Commission overseeing the graves.

After the Falklands War, one family requested the repatriation of their son's body, a request that led to other families seeking the same. In response, the UK government offered to repatriate the bodies of all fallen servicemen. On 16 November 1982, 64 of the deceased (52 soldiers, 11 Royal Marines, and a laundryman from Hong Kong) were returned to Britain aboard the landing ship Sir Bedivere.

The families of 16 of the fallen chose to keep with tradition, preferring their sons' remains to remain in the Falklands. Fourteen are buried at Port San Carlos, while two more are laid to rest at isolated single grave sites in Goose Green and Port Howard. The fifteenth person interred at Port San Carlos is Captain John Belt of the Army Air Corps, who died in a helicopter crash in January 1984.

== Design ==
In 1982, at the request of the Ministry of Defence, the Commonwealth War Graves Commission undertook the design and construction of a cemetery and memorial. The plans were approved by the MOD on 12 November 1982 at a total cost of £50,000. The work was completed with the assistance of 8 Field Squadron Royal Engineers and the Brigade of Gurkhas and The Royal Irish Rangers and dedicated on 10 April 1983. The headstones are of Orton Scar limestone and the memorial panels are of light sea green slate from Cumbria.

The cemetery is surrounded by a 3 feet (1 metre) high wall with a small entrance open to the beach in the style of a stone sheep corral. Opposite the entrance, the wall is tapered higher with seven slate panels, six with the Regiment, Name, Rank and Service of the fallen and one with the three Forces' Emblems and the following inscription;

1982
APRIL–JUNE
IN HONOUR OF
THE SOUTH ATLANTIC TASK FORCE
AND TO THE ABIDING MEMORY OF
THE SAILORS, SOLDIERS AND AIRMEN
WHO GAVE THEIR LIVES AND WHO
HAVE NO GRAVE BUT THE SEA
HERE BESIDE THE
GRAVES OF THEIR COMRADES THIS
MEMORIAL RECORDS THEIR NAMES

GIVE GLORY TO THE LORD AND
DECLARE HIS PRAISE IN THE ISLANDS

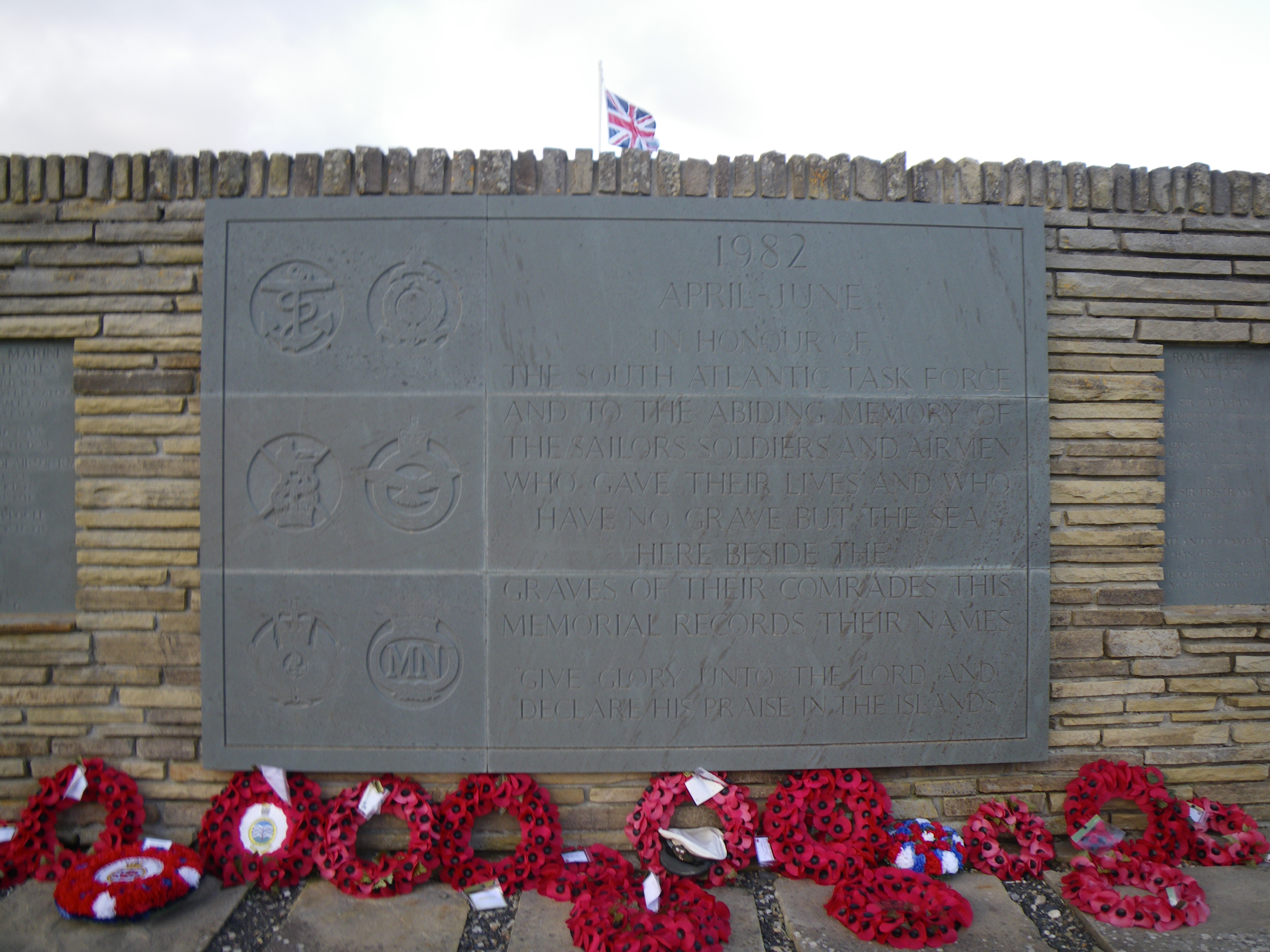
Cemetery inscription

The site is divided into two sections each with seven graves. The section on the right is known as the Airborne Cemetery as it contains the remains of four Paratroopers including that of Lieutenant-Colonel "H" Jones. Alongside them are the two members of the Royal Signals and one of the Army Air Corps pilots killed when their Gazelle helicopter was shot down in error by HMS Cardiff. Directly opposite are another seven headstones laid out in the same pattern with the remains of seven Royal Marines. The grave of Captain Belt sits on its own inside the entry gate to the right, having been added after the cemetery was completed. Nearby is the San Carlos museum, with photographs and relics from the conflict.

On 21 May 2002, the 20th anniversary of the landings, a service of remembrance was held at the cemetery. Over 300 islanders and personnel from the garrison joined the Falklands Governor, in remembering those who lost their lives in the campaign. Ahead of this ceremony, the cemetery landscaping around the graves was overhauled and refreshed through the installation of timber boards, gravel infill, and planting. This work was organised through and carried out by contracting organisations employed at the Mount Pleasant military base.

National Memorial Arboretum in Staffordshire

On 20 May 2012, a duplicate of the San Carlos Memorial was dedicated at the National Memorial Arboretum in Staffordshire England. The official dedication, which was attended by The Band of Her Majesty's Royal Marines also marked the 30th anniversary of the landings.

Speaking at the ceremony, the widow of Lieutenant-Colonel H Jones, Sara, described the memorial as a "Fitting tribute to the members of the Task Force who gave their lives".

== Breakdown of the casualties ==
A total of 255 British servicemen and 3 female Falkland Island civilians were killed during the Falklands War.

- Royal Navy – 86 + 2 Hong Kong laundrymen
- Royal Marines – 27 (2 officers, 14 NCOs and 11 marines)
- Royal Fleet Auxiliary – 4 + 4 Hong Kong laundrymen
- Merchant navy – 6 + 2 Hong Kong sailors
- British Army – 123 (7 officers, 40 NCOs and 76 privates)
- Royal Air Force – 1 (1 officer)
- Falkland Islands civilians – 3 women killed by British shelling.

174 were buried at sea, or lost with their aircraft/ships and their remains not recovered. These are controlled sites under the Protection of Military Remains Act.

- HMS Invincible – 1
- HMS Sheffield –20
- Sea King –1+22
- HMS Ardent – 22
- Sea Harrier – 3
- HMS Argonaut –2
- HMS Coventry – 18
- MV Atlantic Conveyor – 12
- LC Foxtrot 4 of HMS Fearless – 6
- Bluff Cove –54
- HMS Glamorgan –13

=== Buried at San Carlos ===
Rank	Name	Age	Date of death	Unit
Lance Corporal	Colin DAVISON	21	27 May 1982	Commando Logistic Regiment
Corporal	Kenneth EVANS	36	27 May 1982	45 Commando
Marine	David WILSON	20	27 May 1982	45 Commando
Captain	Christopher DENT	34	28 May 1982	2 Para
Private	Mark HOLMAN-SMITH	19	28 May 1982	2 Para
Lieutenant Colonel	Herbert (“H”) JONES VC OBE	42	28 May 1982	2 Para
Lieutenant	Richard James NUNN DFC	27	28 May 1982	3 Commando Brigade Air Squadron
Staff Sergeant	John BAKER	36	6 June 1982	5 Infantry Brigade
Major	Michael L FORGE	40	6 June 1982	5 Infantry Brigade HQ & Signal Sqn
Staff Sergeant	Christopher GRIFFIN	32	6 June 1982	No. 656 Squadron AAC
Sergeant	Robert Arthur LEEMING	32	11 June 1982	45 Commando
Marine	Keith PHILLIPS	19	11 June 1982	45 Commando
Corporal	Andrew Bryan UREN	23	11 June 1982	45 Commando
Private	Francis SLOUGH	19	13 June 1982	2 Para
Captain	John T BELT	39	5 June 1984	Army Air Corps (post war accident)

=== Buried in other places ===
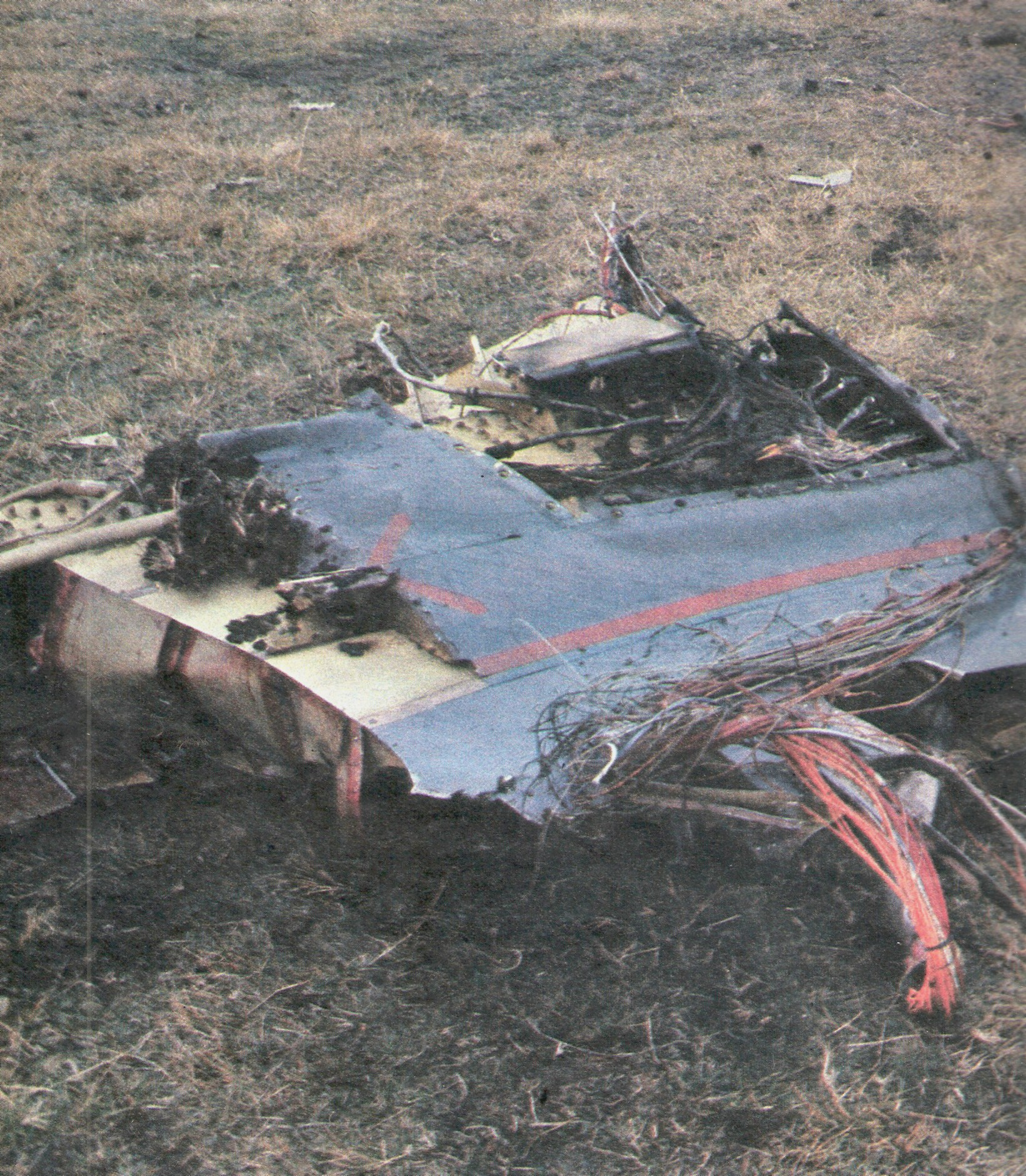
Wreckage from Lt Nick Taylor Sea Harrier

- Lt Nick Taylor RN, shot down over Goose Green by radar-controlled, 35mm Oerlikon fire from GADA 601 as he ran in to attack. Argentine forces buried Taylor with military honours close to where his plane crashed.
- Captain Gavin Hamilton is buried at Port Howard on West Falkland, where he was killed when his observation post was uncovered by Argentine commandos at Many Branch point.
- Two of three Falkland civilians killed during the war, Doreen Bonner and Mary Goodwin, were buried in Port Stanley after the war. Susan Whitely was interred on Sea Lion Island, the most southerly inhabited island in the Falklands.

Three more deaths may be attributed to Operation Corporate, bringing the total to 261:

- Captain Brian Biddick from SS Uganda underwent an emergency operation on the voyage to the Falklands, was repatriated by an RAF medical flight to the hospital at Wroughton, where he died on 12 May.
- Able Seaman David McCann died of wounds 19 August, as a result of the Exocet hit on HMS Glamorgan.
- Marine Engineering Mechanic Paul Mills, from HMS Coventry, suffered complications from a skull fracture sustained in the sinking of his ship and died on 29 March 1983. He is buried in his home town of Swavesey.

== See also ==
- Argentine Military Cemetery – near Darwin Settlement, it holds the remains of 237 Argentine casualties
- Grytviken Cemetery – which holds the remains of Félix Artuso, an Argentinian submarine officer who was killed in the 1982 British recapture of South Georgia from Argentina
