= Uganda Landmine Survivors Association =

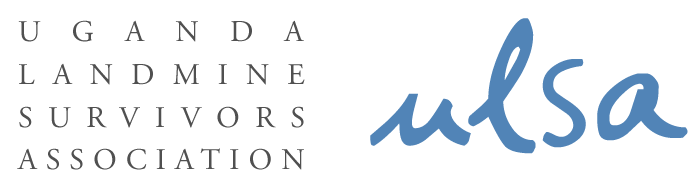

The Uganda Landmine Survivors Association (ULSA) is a non-governmental organization, focused primarily on advocacy and victim assistance throughout Uganda. The organization was founded in April 2005 in order to campaign against the use, production and transfer of landmines, cluster munitions and explosive remnants of war (ERWs). ULSA also serves as a peer to peer support network for survivors, providing them with training in vocational, leadership and advocacy skills in partnership with other organizations throughout Northern and Western Uganda.

The Uganda Landmine Survivors Association is composed of district-level survivor groups across the country and other like minded NGOs and stakeholders whose mandate include addressing landmine related issues, support to landmine survivors and other persons with disabilities, including survivor groups in Apac, Lira, Gulu, Kasese, Kitgum, Oyam and Pader. There are 2,039 estimated victims of antipersonnel mines living in Uganda.

== Contamination throughout Uganda ==
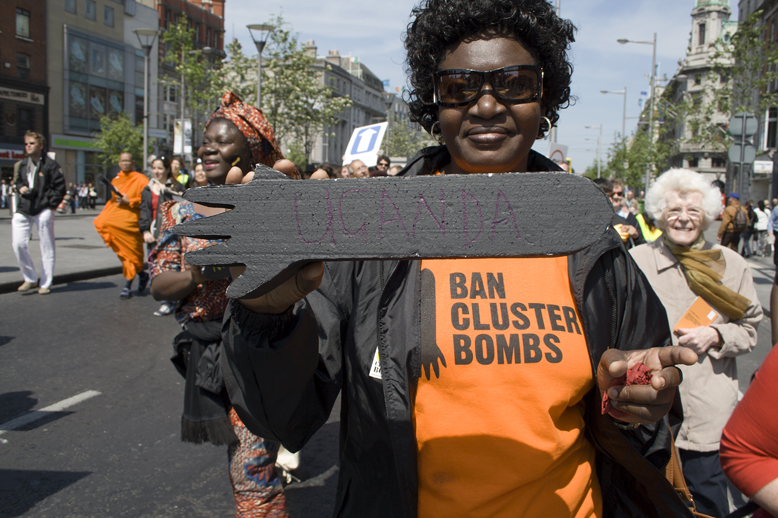
Ugandan landmine survivor and campaigner Margaret Arach Orech founded the Uganda Landmine Survivors Association organization in April 2005, shown here at the May 2008 Dublin conference for the Convention on Cluster Munitions. In 2006, Orech was appointed ambassador to the International Campaign to Ban Landmines

Decades of violence and incivility have forced some 1.8 million people to leave their homes in Northern Uganda. Since 2006, the landlocked African nation has been negotiating a peace deal with the Lord's Resistance Army, a rebel group known for terrorizing the Acholi and Lango people of the North through child-abductions, mutilation, massacre and sexual enslavement.

There is also significant contamination in the Western region of Uganda, stemming from conflict on the Congolese border.

Despite improving political conditions, however, landmine survivors continue to face serious injustices daily in Uganda, including inadequate medical support and inability to find sufficient employment or food. Moreover, victims are often shunned by their families for fear of becoming a burden.

While the landmine problem in Uganda is less severe than countries like Angola, Mozambique and Afghanistan, the nature of the weapon has made it difficult to overcome. According to Ugandan officials, there are more than 350 suspected hazardous areas in the country, of which 153 are Kitgum; 91 in Gulu; 61 in Amuru and 57 in Kasese.

== See also ==
- International Campaign to Ban Landmines
- Convention on Cluster Munitions
