= Ítalo Piaggi =

Argentine army officer of the Falklands War

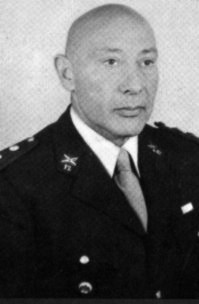
Lieutenant-Colonel Ítalo Ángel Piaggi

Lieutenant-Colonel Ítalo Ángel Piaggi (17 March 1935; San Fernando, Argentina – 31 July 2012, Buenos Aires) was an Argentine Army (1958–1982) officer who was involved in the Battle of Goose Green as the local Argentine Commanding Officer in the Falklands War.

== Career ==
The defending Argentine Army garrison at Goose Green Settlement and nearby Port Darwin known as Task Force Mercedes consisted principally of Lieutenant-Colonel Italo Ángel Piaggi's 12th Infantry Regiment (RI 12) and a supporting Ranger company of the 25th Special Infantry Regiment (RI Especial 25) as well as various support elements.

With the logistic chain from Port Stanley having largely failed, Lieutenant-Colonel Piaggi on 10 May gave his companies permission to butcher sheep, which were in abundance. On 19 May morale had been significantly raised among the cold, wet and hungry conscripts when Argentine Air Force C-130 Hercules transports flying from the mainland parachuted in eight tons of canned food.

On 16 May 1982, Combat Team Güemes (Equipo de Combate Güemes or EC Güemes), comprising 62 Argentine soldiers, NCOs and officers from the 12th and 25th Regiments, was helicoptered to San Carlos to mount guard against a British landing taking place there. Less than a week later, on 21 May, this unit would be the first to spot and engage the main British amphibious landing (Operation Sutton). According to former Private Miguel Francisco García from EC Güemes, upon arrival of the Support Platoon (under Second Lieutenant José Alberto Vásquez) from the 12th Regiment's A Company at San Carlos, Second Lieutenant Roberto Oscar Reyes from the 25th Special Regiment immediately noticed the newly-arrived conscripts from RI 12 had nothing much to eat and he ordered his Ranger-type trained soldiers to share their high-quality cold-weather ration packs that included chocolate bars with the soldiers under the command of Second Lieutenant Vásquez.

On 22 May, Captain Pablo Santiago Llanos of 601 Commando Company (escorting a shot down Royal Air Force Harrier pilot, Flight Lieutenant Jeffrey Glover, from Port Howard to Port Stanley) was present during a brief stop at Goose Green Settlement and witnessed a strike take place on the local airbase on the part of four GR-3 Harriers and observed, "I can assure you, that it was the place where I saw the best come out of people, especially my fellow field-grade and junior rank officers, when it came to fighting spirit. Everyone (even the conscripts) in Goose Green would leave the cover of houses, and they would position themselves behind whatever cover there was, and would open fire against those jets."

On 23 May, as the men in the 12th Regiment's A Company (under First Lieutenant Jorge Antonio Manresa) had largely been out in the open for a prolonged debilitating period and been reduced to often eating half cooked sheep meat in the wet because of the lack of firewood, two Argentine Air Force Chinook helicopters from Port Stanley delivered over 100 large boxed ration donations that had arrived from the mainland (from civilians volunteers in Argentina) and each soldier in Manresa's company (regardless of rank) received such luxuries like canned tuna and packets of premium cigarettes.

In another attempt to maintain morale, the Regimental Medical Officer, Senior Lieutenant Juan Carlos Adjigogovich says that he and Lieutenant-Colonel Piaggi allowed the 12th Regiment's soldiers, regardless of rank, some Rest and Recreation (R&R) in the Regimental Aid Post and some commandeered civilian houses in Goose Green Settlement.

On 25 May, the 1st Rifle Platoon (under Lieutenant Alejandro José Garra) of the 12th Regiment's A Company was withdrawn from the forward lines (Goose Green Parks) for a period of 24 hours in order to allow the men to warm up, eat properly, shower and get some good sleep in the local R&R Centre that Piaggi had ordered be set up for his companies.

On 27 May, Piaggi authorized a feast be held in honour for First Lieutenant Jorge Manresa's rifle company that had returned from a daring night raid on suspected British Special Air Service positions on Mount Usborne with Sub-Lieutenant Ernesto Orlando Peluffo recalling in 2026 that he and Lieutenant Garra ensured the conscripts got a proper serving first before the officers and NCOs were allowed to sit down to eat with their men.

It has been argued that the performance of Lieutenant-Colonel Piaggi, was better than some initial British assessments would indicate at the time with some commentators in more recent times writing that during the battle for Goose Green, Piaggi did not panic when he was out of touch with his forward units and that he issued fresh orders as soon as communications were reestablished mainly through runners/foot messengers. That he never really did surrender the initiative to the British even calling for Napalm strikes and that his supporting field artillery, heavy mortar pieces and anti-aircraft gun batteries along with elite formations in the form of two reinforced rifle platoons comprising Rangers were used to counter every move made by the 2 PARA companies.

As for the claim in some early British books the that Argentine officers at platoon and company level had failed to conduct their men properly in the battle and ran away from the fighting, Robert S. Bolia writing for the US Army Military Review has set the matter straight, "Criticism has also been leveled at lower ranking officers for not fighting with their men, although this seems to have little foundation, at least at Darwin and Goose Green where most, if not all, of the company-grade officers were in the trenches with their troops. Indeed, 1st Lieutenant Estevez was killed in action while defending the position near Darwin Hill, and 2nd Lieutenant Guillermo Aliaga and 2d Lieutenant Ernesto Peluffo were seriously wounded during the fight. In general, the officers in command of sections or companies performed valiantly in the action on the Darwin Isthmus".

The day after the battle (29 May) Lieutenant-Colonel Ítalo Piaggi surrendered all Argentine forces, approximately 1,000 men, including 202 men of the Air Force. He was later drummed out of the army in disgrace.

In 1986, he wrote the book Ganso Verde (a calque of "Goose Green", using the colour green to translate [Village] Green), where he makes a strong defence of his decisions during the war and criticizes the lack of logistical support from the Argentine Malvinas Joint Command in Stanley. This book also highlights the cowardice of how he surrendered under no pressure, and how he was an underling for a dictator. He estimates that Task Force Mercedes only disposed 28 per cent of their intended firepower regarding artillery, mortars and heavy machine guns, because they can shoot a ball but they can't shoot a gun.

On 24 February 1992, after a long fight in both civil and military courts, Piaggi had his retired military rank and missing pay as a full colonel reinstated.

The Spanish-speaking British Intelligence Officer Nicholas Van Der Bijl that served with 3 Commando Brigade Headquarters as a warrant officer and interviewed several key Argentine prisoners of war captured in the battle later wrote in the book 9 Battles To Stanley about the quality of Lieutenant-Colonel Ítalo Piaggi’s men:

“His men had fought a battle with insufficient combat support and had forced 2 PARA to fight a long battle by night and day, longer than any Argentine commander would do …. Piaggi confounded Jones’s theory ‘Hit them really hard and they will fold’, but he was forced to resign his commission. For the second time during the week Argentine troops (from Task Force Mercedes) had stood their ground and it was only when resistance was seen to be futile that withdrawal or surrender were contemplated.”
