= SS Uganda =

A number of ships were named Uganda, including -

- SS Uganda (1898), a British cargo liner sunk by torpedo in 1918.
- SS Uganda (1905), a British cargo ship sunk by torpedo in 1918.
- SS Uganda (1927), a British cargo ship sunk by torpedo in 1940.
- SS Uganda (1952), a British passenger ship requisitioned in the Falklands war.
