= Kapteyn =

Kapteyn may refer to:

- Jacobus Kapteyn - Astronomer
  - Parallactic instrument of Kapteyn - the instrument used by Kapteyn to analyze photographic plates
  - Jacobus Kapteyn Telescope - telescope named after Jacobus Kapteyn
  - Kapteyn's Star - star named after Jacobus Kapteyn
  - Kapteyn (crater) - Lunar crater named after Jacobus Kapteyn
  - Kapteyn Astronomical Institute - Dutch Astronomical Institute named after Jacobus Kapteyn
- Paul Joan George Kapteyn - Dutch judge
