= Alraigo incident =

1983 British Royal Navy emergency landing

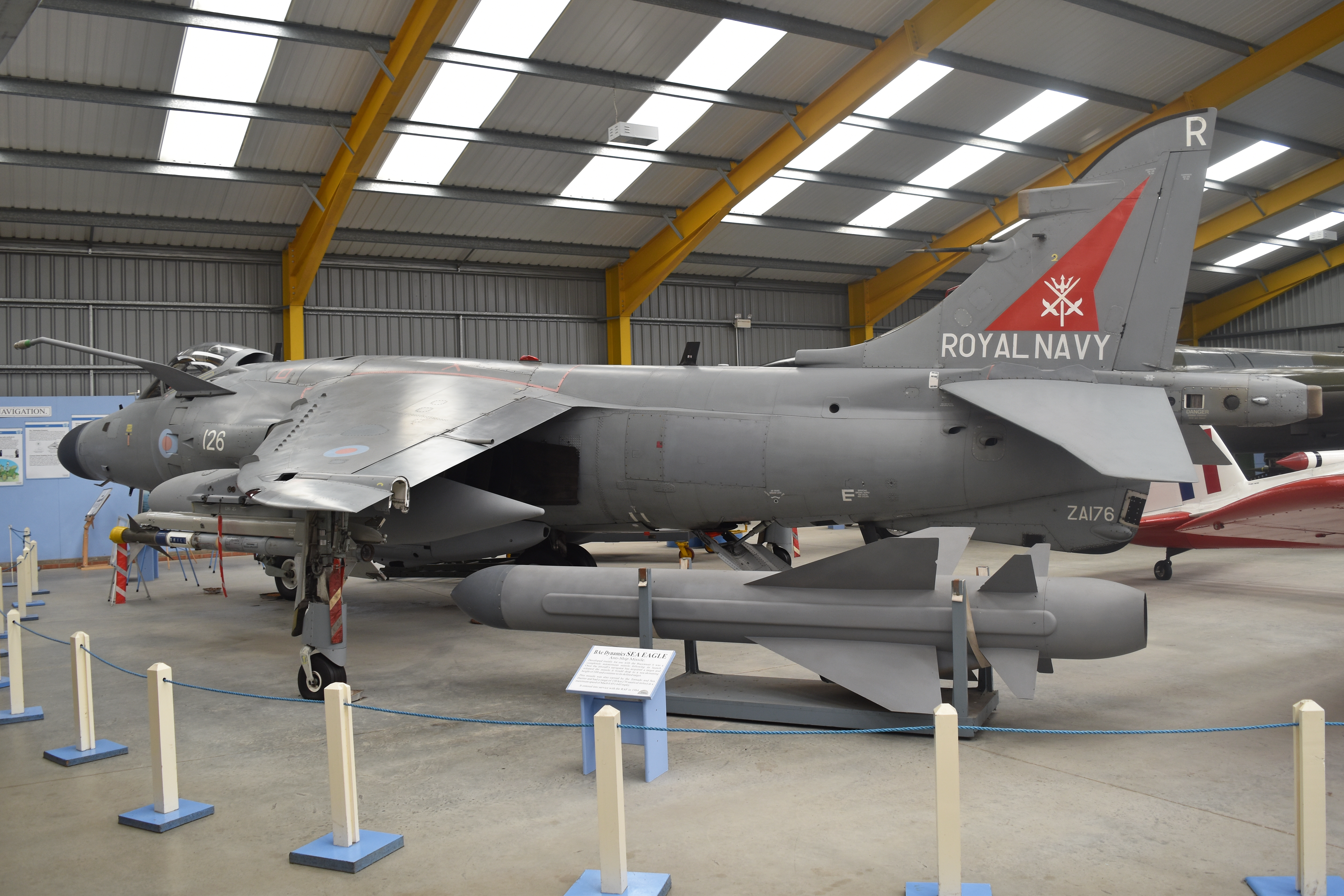
- Sea Harrier ZA176, the aircraft involved in the emergency landing, preserved at Newark Air Museum

Incident
- Date: 6 June 1983
- Summary: Emergency vertical landing on a container ship due to lack of fuel
- Site: Alraigo in the Atlantic Ocean off Portugal

Aircraft
- Aircraft type: BAe Sea Harrier FRS.1
- Operator: Fleet Air Arm (Royal Navy)
- Registration: ZA176
- Flight origin: HMS Illustrious (R06)
- Destination: HMS Illustrious (R06)
- Occupants: 1
- Crew: 1
- Fatalities: 0
- Injuries: 0
- Survivors: 1

The Alraigo incident occurred on 6 June 1983, when a lost British Royal Navy Sea Harrier fighter aircraft landed on the deck of a Spanish container ship.

== History ==
Its pilot, Sub-Lieutenant Ian "Soapy" Watson, was a junior Royal Navy pilot undertaking his first NATO exercise from HMS Illustrious (R06), which was operating off the coast of Portugal. Watson was launched in a pair of aircraft tasked with locating a French aircraft carrier under combat conditions including radio silence and radar switched off. After completing the search, Watson attempted to return to the Illustrious, but was unable to locate it. Running low on fuel, and with his radio having stopped working, Watson headed towards a nearby shipping lane, where he made visual contact with the container ship Alraigo.

He initially planned to eject in sight of the vessel, but noticed that its cargo provided a flat landing surface. The ship was carrying a base plate for the Jacobus Kapteyn Telescope, which was being constructed in the Canary Islands. He decided to land on the ship.

Four days later, the Alraigo arrived at Santa Cruz de Tenerife with the Sea Harrier still perched on its container. The event received widespread media coverage. The aircraft was salvageable, and the crew and owners of Alraigo were awarded £570,000 compensation, divided between £340,000 for the crew and £230,000 for the owners.

No action was taken against Watson by the Board of Inquiry held aboard Illustrious on his return. A second board of inquiry, convened once the ship reached port, found that he had completed only 75% of the recommended flying hours before being sent to sea, and criticised his commanders for assigning him an aircraft "not fully prepared for the sortie" because of its defective radio, but nevertheless blamed his inexperience. He was reprimanded for displaying "an unsatisfactory standard of fundamental airmanship" and reassigned to a desk job. The findings became public only when the file was released by the National Archives in 2007. According to The Daily Telegraph, the released file indicated that the Navy had been "laying the blame elsewhere" in an attempt to avoid the outstanding salvage claim. Watson has said that he believed the reprimand stemmed from the embarrassment the publicity caused the Royal Navy, but declined to apportion blame, saying "It was me. I was there and that's where it should stop." He eventually returned to flight duties and accrued nearly 3,000 hours of flying time before resigning his commission in 1996. Sea Harrier ZA176 was converted to the FA2 variant in 1992 and retired from service 20 September 2003. The aircraft is now on display at Newark Air Museum in Nottinghamshire, England in its FA2 configuration.
