= Parallactic instrument of Kapteyn =

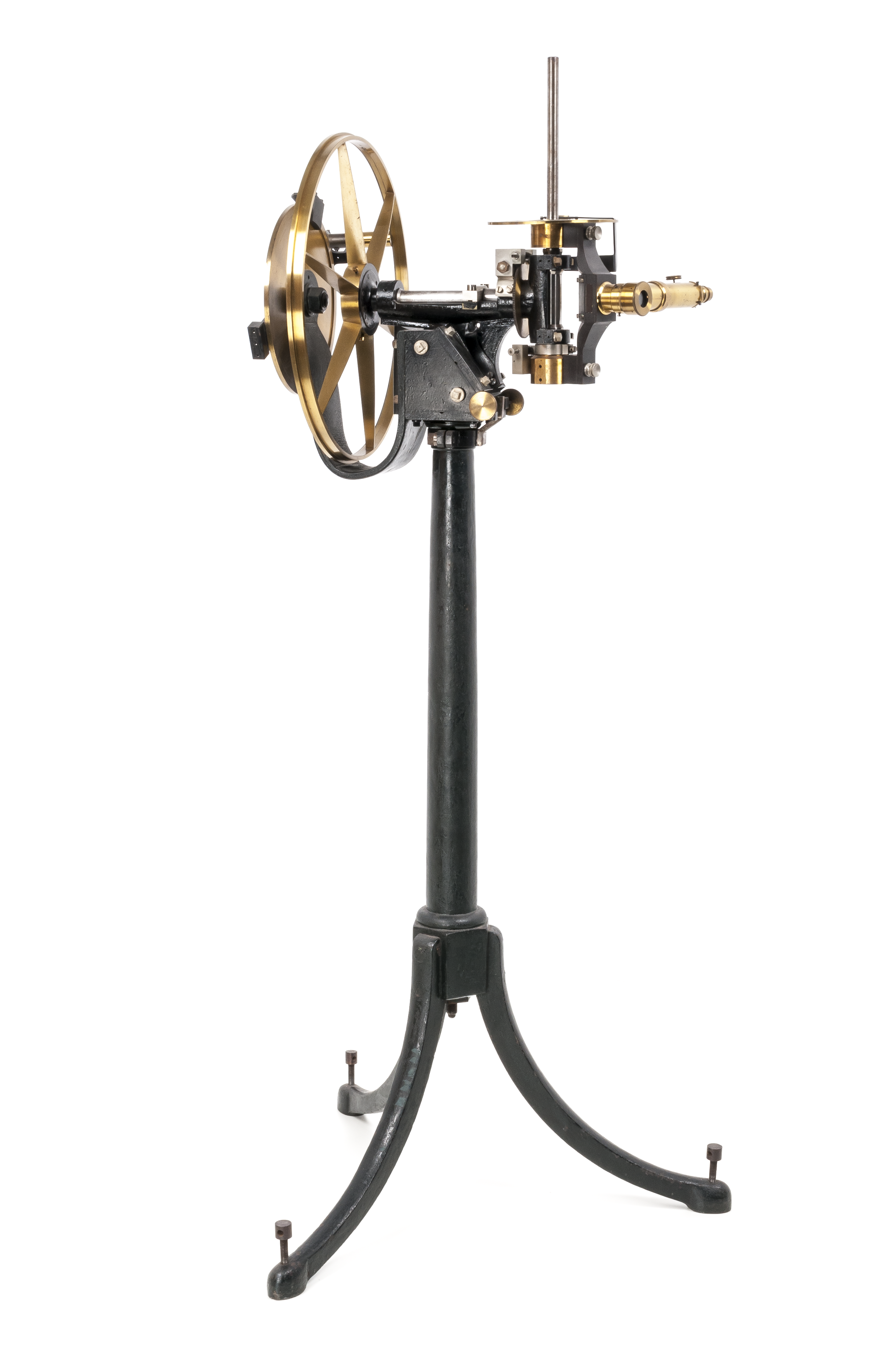
A photo of Kapteyn's instrument. Not shown is the holder for glass plate photos.

The parallactic instrument of Kapteyn is a measuring instrument created by the Dutch astronomer Jacobus Kapteyn around 1886. Using this instrument, Kapteyn analyzed over 1,700 glass plate photos of stars seen from the Southern Hemisphere. This research contributed to the Cape Photographic Durchmusterung, a star catalogue containing 454,875 entries. Together with the measurements of stars seen from the Northern Hemisphere (the Bonner Durchmusterung) the measurements of Kapteyn formed a complete star catalogue with a scope and accuracy that was impressive for its time.

The instrument is currently located in the collection of the University Museum of Groningen.

== Origin ==
Since Kapteyn lacked an observatory of his own in Groningen, he used a homemade instrument for the analysis of glass plate photos of stars, made by his colleague David Gill in Cape Town. Kapteyn built the instrument with several parts from other (measuring) instruments.

Although Kapteyn called it a ‘parallactic instrument’, the instrument is not related to the parallax effect. The name may come from the chassis of the instrument, which is originally from an instrument with a 'parallactic mount'.

== Use ==
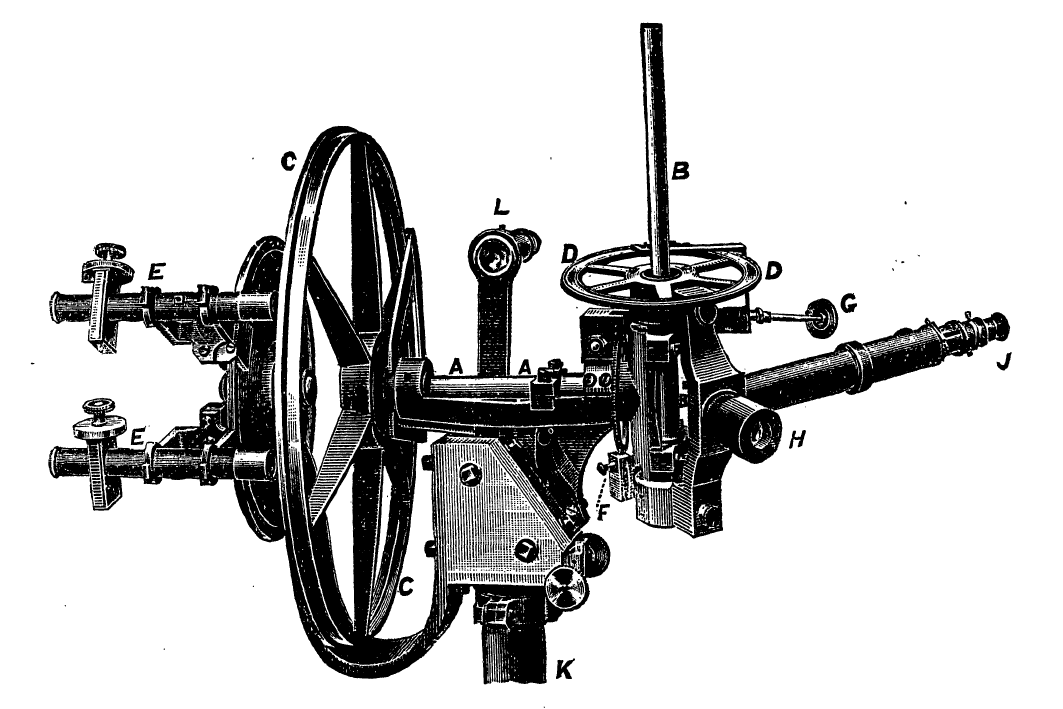
A drawing of the instrument of Kapteyn.

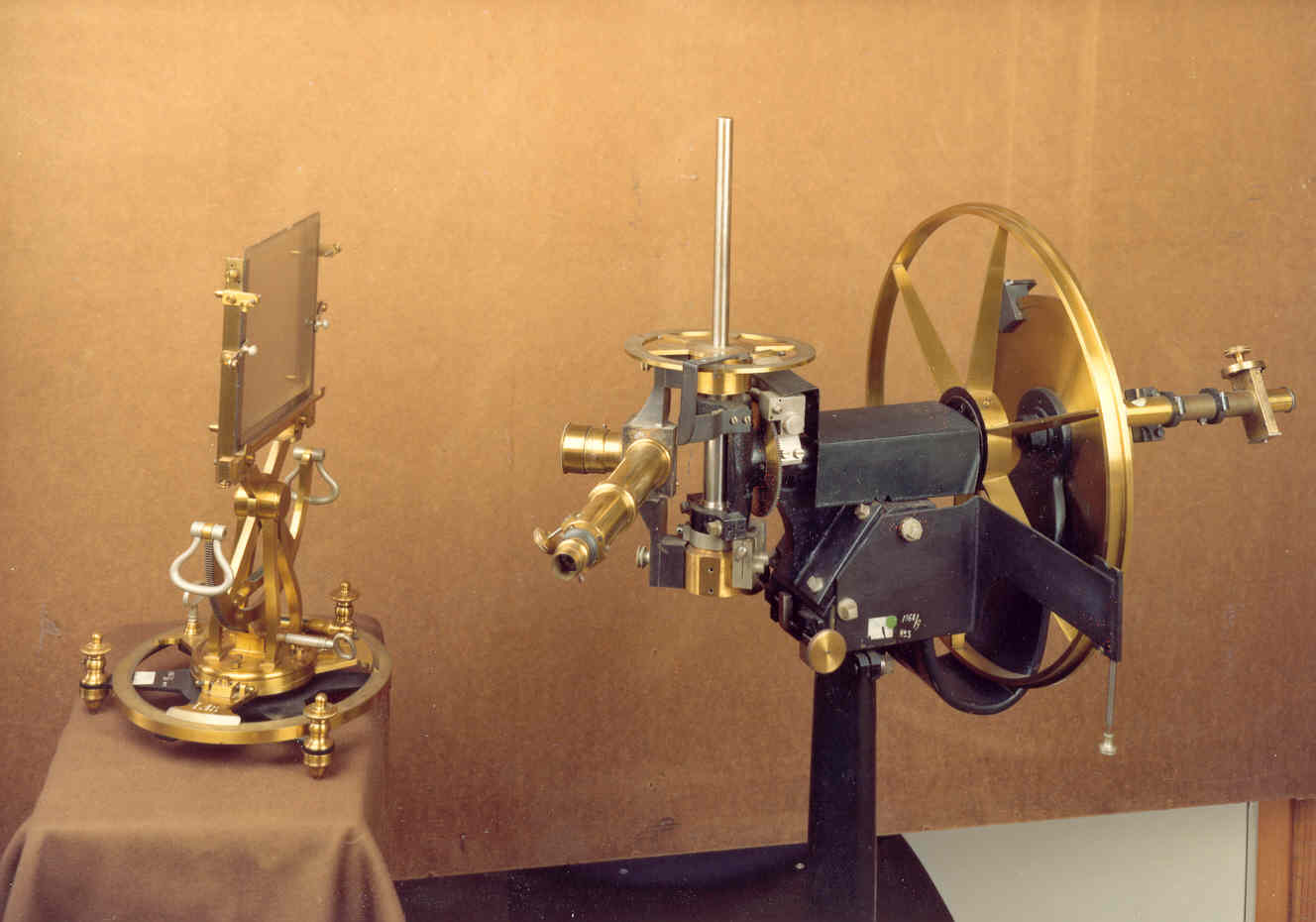
A photo of the instrument of Kapteyn and its accompanying glass plate holder.

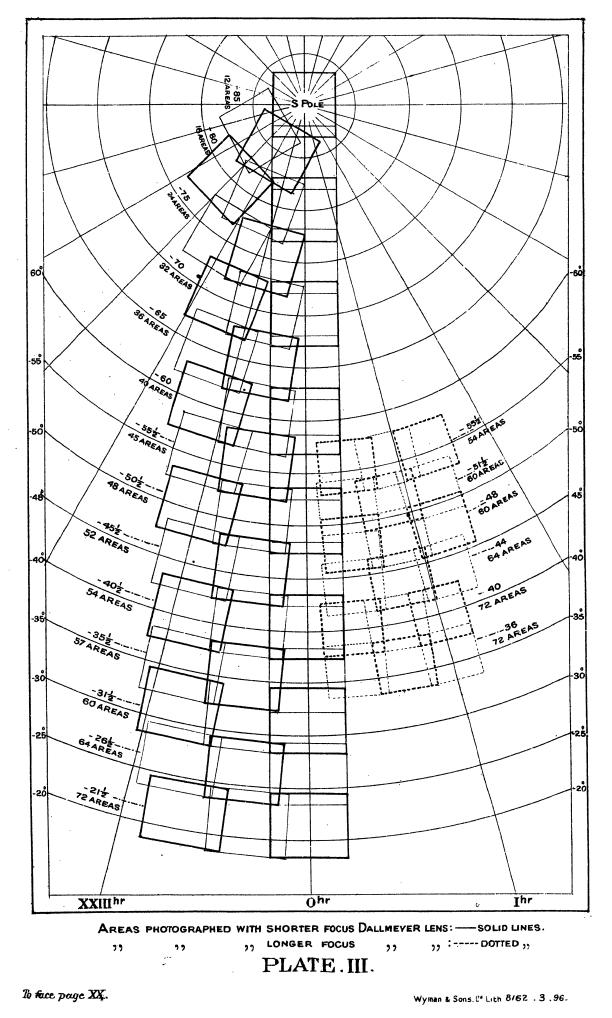
The distribution of the glass plate photos over the sky. The plates overlap at the edges.

Three researchers were needed to perform measurements with the instrument, each with their own task:

1. Aiming the lens at a star, estimating the diameter of the star, and reading the declination.
2. Reading the right ascension using a small microscope.
3. Writing down the results, as told to him by the other researchers.

To use the instrument, the researcher must look through the ocular (part J), and aim the lens (H) at a glass plate photo (see drawing). The distance between the center point of the instrument and the plate to be measured must be the same distance as the focal length of the telescope that was used to take the photos (in the case of Gill's photos: 54 inches (140 cm). By rotating the right axis (B) the researcher can aim the lens at a star of interest. The researcher can read the position of the star on the wheel (D) below the right axis (B). Similarly, parts A and C can be used to determine the right ascension. Part L is no longer on the instrument. Using this smaller telescope the researcher could correctly position the instrument in relation to the glass plate photo.

For each position on the sky, Kapteyn used two photos (each made on a different night). He placed these photos in sequence (with approximately 1 millimeter of space in between), with one being slightly displaced. This allowed him to easily distinguish stars from dust particles on the glass plate.

== Use by Kapteyn ==
Kapteyn and his staff members analyzed the first photo (aimed at the South Pole) on October 28, 1886, and the final photo (aimed at 85° declination) on June 9, 1887. They used in the instrument in a laboratory of Dirk Huizinga, a professor in physiology who made two of his rooms available to them. Kapteyn and his staff members analyzed the glass plate photos in duplicate and darkened the room to get a better view of details in the photos.

Kapteyn and his staff performed some repeat measurements in 1892, 1896, 1897 and 1892. Kapteyn and Gill published their Durchmusterung in three volumes that together formed the Cape Photographic Durchmusterung: declination zones -18° to -37° (1896), -38° to -52° (1897) and -53° to -89° (1900).

=== Influence on the private life of Kapteyn ===
Working with the instrument had a significant impact on the health and private life of Kapteyn. Kapteyn often felt pain in his eyes and stomach and became easily agitated due to the intense labor. After completing one of the last measurements, Kapteyn wrote to Gill: "...- and the truth is that I find my patience nearly exhausted", with which he referred to the analysis for the Cape Photographic Durchmusterung. Additionally, Kapteyn wrote about working on the Durchmusterung: "There is a sort of fate that which makes me do my life long just what I want to do least of all."

=== Prisoners ===
The British astronomer Arthur Stanley Eddington claimed that prisoners were part of the staff of Kapteyn that worked with his instrument. However, this fact is deemed implausible, since prisoners only performed relatively simple tasks in this time period and because this fact was never brought up in any correspondence with Kapteyn.

== Impact ==
The publication of the measurements performed with the instrument of Kapteyn marked a major breakthrough for Kapteyn in the field of astronomy. In 1901 Kapteyn was the first Dutchman to receive a golden medal from the British Royal Astronomical Society. Kapteyn had been a member of this organisation since 1892. Furthermore, working with the instrument may have inspired the theories of Kapteyn about the shape of the Milky Way. Kapteyn first discussed these theories in 1891 during a rectorial speech.

The American astronomer Simon Newcomb praised Kapteyn and his work: "This work [the Cape Photographic Durchmusterung] of Kapteyn offers a remarkable example of the spirit which animates the born investigator of the heavens."

Jacob Halm remarked that the results of the Cape Photographic Durchmusterung had an accuracy comparable to that of the results of the northern hemisphere. The astronomer Henry Sawerthal, who visited the laboratory of Kapteyn in 1889, described the results as "...sufficient in the present instance to give results more accurate than those of the Northern Durchmusterung, a remark which not only applies to positions, but to magnitude (also)."

The German astronomer Max Wolf had such admiration for the instrument of Kapteyn that he built his own 'improved' version of the instrument.

== See also ==
- Jacobus Kapteyn
- Kapteyn's Star (discovered with this instrument in 1897)
- Durchmusterung
- David Gill (astronomer)
- Triquetrum (astronomy)
- University museum of Groningen (Dutch Wikipedia)
