= 818 Kapteynia =

Main-belt asteroid

Discovery
- Discovered by: Max Wolf
- Discovery site: Heidelberg Observatory
- Discovery date: 21 February 1916

Designations
- Pronunciation: /kæpˈteɪniə/
- Alternative designations: 1916 YZ

Orbital characteristics
- Epoch 31 July 2016 (JD 2457600.5)
- Uncertainty parameter 0
- Observation arc: 99.92 yr (36496 d)
- Aphelion: 3.4695 AU (519.03 Gm)
- Perihelion: 2.8693 AU (429.24 Gm)
- Semi-major axis: 3.1694 AU (474.14 Gm)
- Eccentricity: 0.094677
- Orbital period (sidereal): 5.64 yr (2060.9 d)
- Mean anomaly: 38.374°
- Mean motion: 0° 10^{m} 28.848^{s} / day
- Inclination: 15.664°
- Longitude of ascending node: 70.816°
- Argument of perihelion: 293.096°
- Earth MOID: 1.91242 AU (286.094 Gm)
- Jupiter MOID: 2.0269 AU (303.22 Gm)
- T_{Jupiter}: 3.138

Physical characteristics
- Mean radius: 24.725±1.95 km
- Synodic rotation period: 16.35 h (0.681 d)
- Geometric albedo: 0.1655±0.029
- Absolute magnitude (H): 9.3

818 Kapteynia is a minor planet orbiting the Sun. This asteroid is named for the Dutch astronomer Jacobus Kapteyn.
