= Jacobus Kapteyn Telescope =

Optical telescope

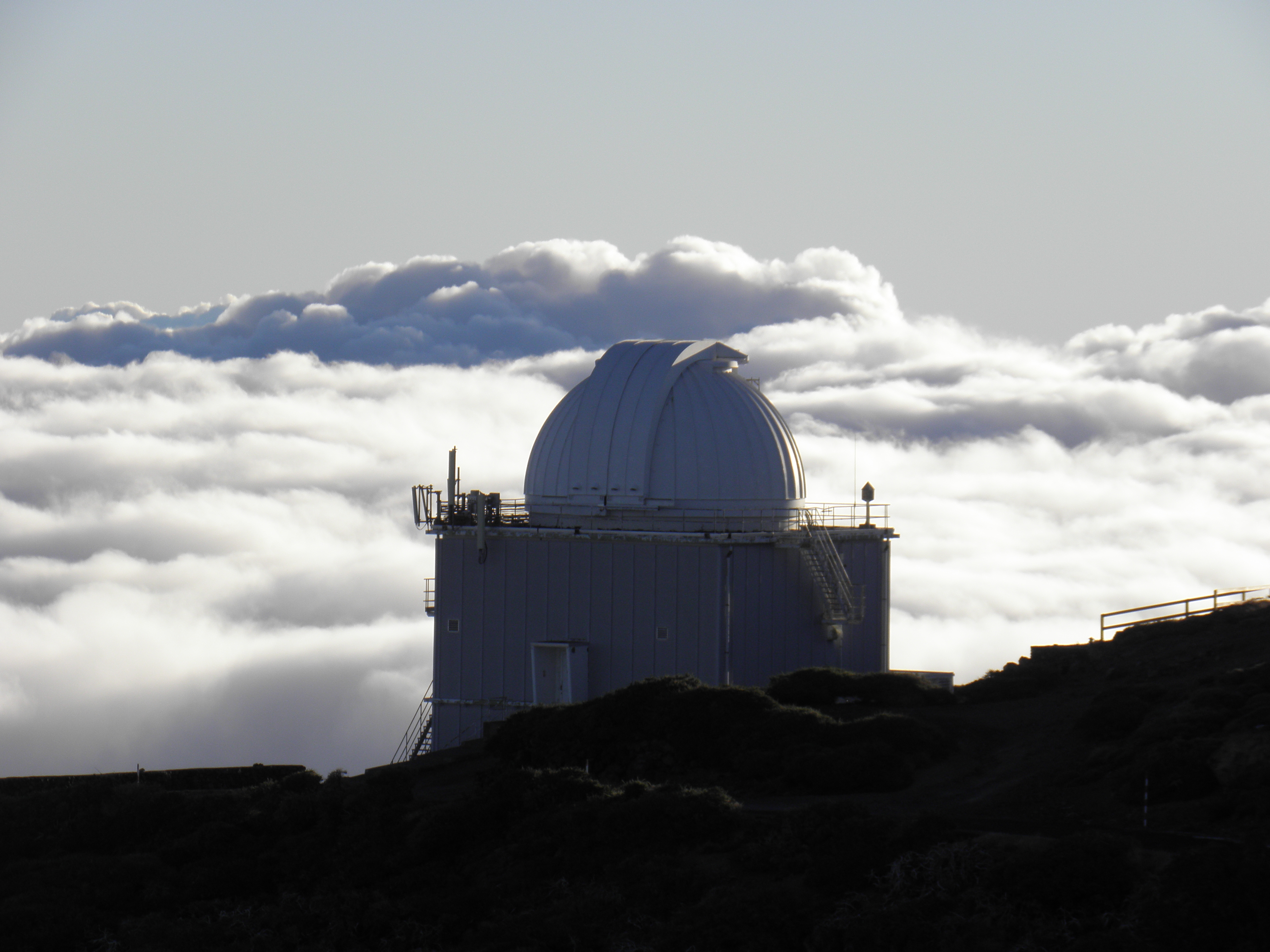
- The Jacobus Kapteyn Telescope in 2011 against a background of clouds as the sun rises
- Alternative names: JKT
- Location(s): Roque de los Muchachos Observatory, Garafía, Province of Santa Cruz de Tenerife, Canary Islands, Spain
- Coordinates: 28°45′40″N 17°52′41″W
- Organization: SARA; Isaac Newton Group of Telescopes
- Altitude: 2,369 m (7,772 ft)
- First light: 23 March 1984
- Diameter: 1.0 m (3 ft 3 in)
- Mass: 40 t (40,000 kg)
- Website: www.ing.iac.es/PR/jkt_info/
- Location within Canary Islands
- Related media on Commons

The Jacobus Kapteyn Telescope or JKT is a 1-metre optical telescope named for the Dutch astronomer Jacobus Kapteyn (1851–1922) of the Isaac Newton Group of Telescopes at the Roque de los Muchachos Observatory on La Palma in the Canary Islands, Spain.

Funded jointly by the Netherlands and the United Kingdom with planning throughout the 1970s, construction of the JKT was completed in 1983 with the first photographic plate taken in March 1984. It can be used with two different focal points and different instruments, although by 1998 this was refined to one CCD imaging instrument. The telescope weighs nearly 40 metric tons in total.

During construction in 1983, a Spanish container ship carrying parts of the telescope to La Palma was involved in an aircraft incident. In what is known as the Alraigo incident, a British Royal Navy Sea Harrier fighter jet made an emergency landing on the base plate for the telescope.

Being superseded by more recent and larger telescopes, it was taken out of service as a common-user facility in August 2003.

Since 2014, the telescope is owned by the Instituto de Astrofísica de Canarias (IAC) and operated by the Southeastern Association for Research in Astronomy (SARA) which has retrofitted JKT as a remotely operated observatory (under the internal designation SARA-RM), with the first new observations in this regime in April 2016.

== Timeline ==
Summary:

- 1984-2003 ING
- 2003-2014 occasional project use
- January 2014, IAC ownership
- 2015, resumed operations as robotic telescope for SARA

== Views ==
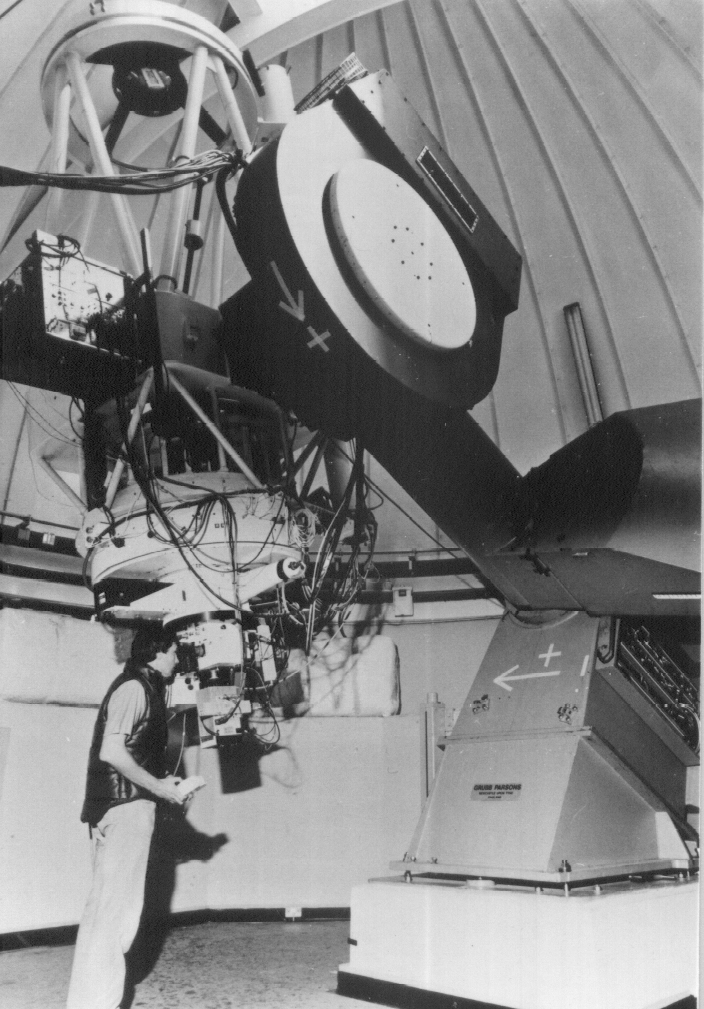
Observation through the telescope, 1985.

== See also ==
- List of largest optical telescopes in the 20th century
