= Jacobus Kapteyn =

Dutch astronomer (1851–1922)

Professor Jacobus Kapteyn FRS FRSE
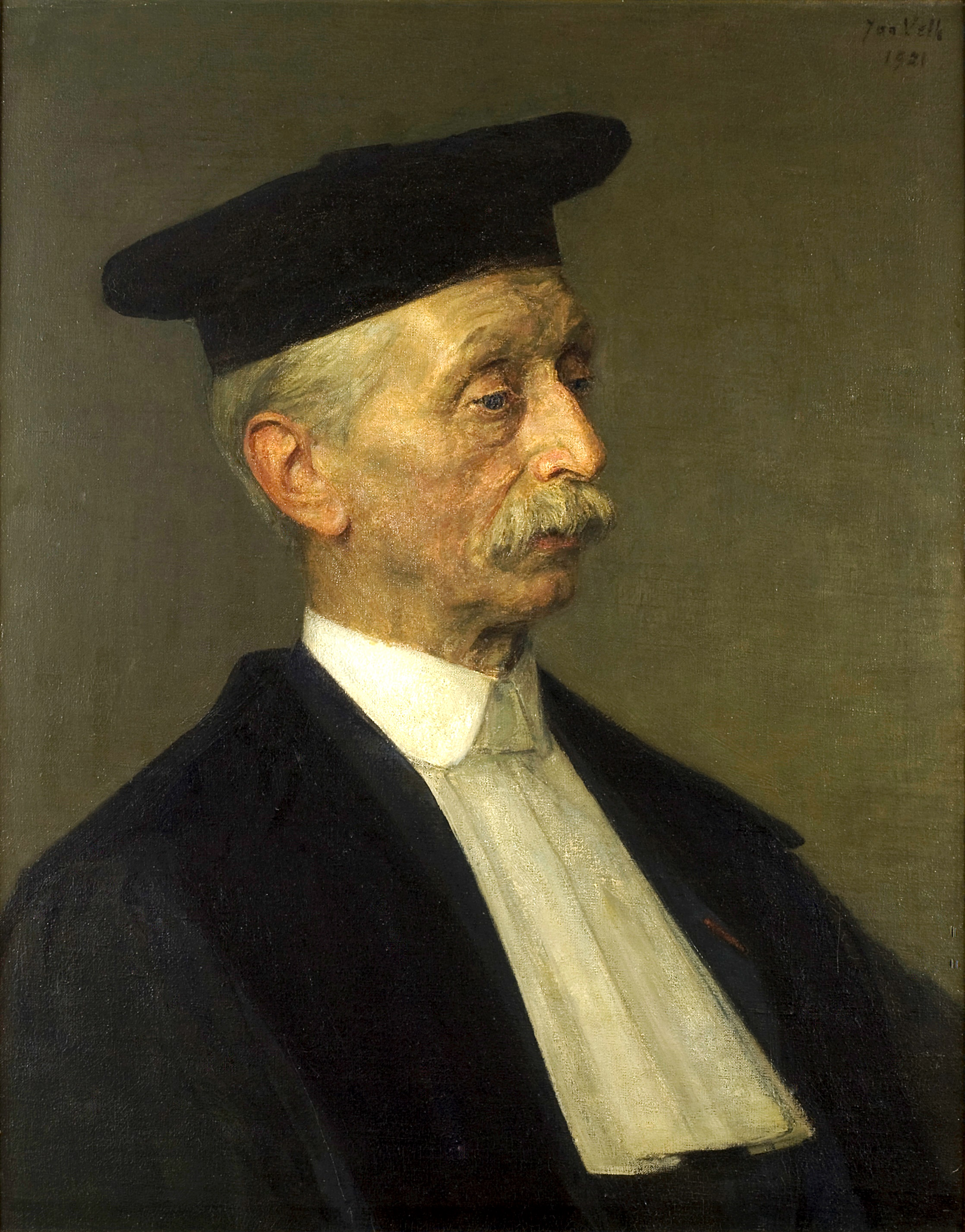
- Jacobus Kapteyn. Painting by Jan Veth (1921).
- Born: Jacobus Cornelius Kapteyn; 19 January 1851; Barneveld, Netherlands
- Died: 18 June 1922 (aged 71); Amsterdam, Netherlands
- Education: University of Utrecht
- Known for: discovery of evidence for galactic rotation
- Awards: Bruce Medal 1913
- Scientific career
- Fields: Astronomy

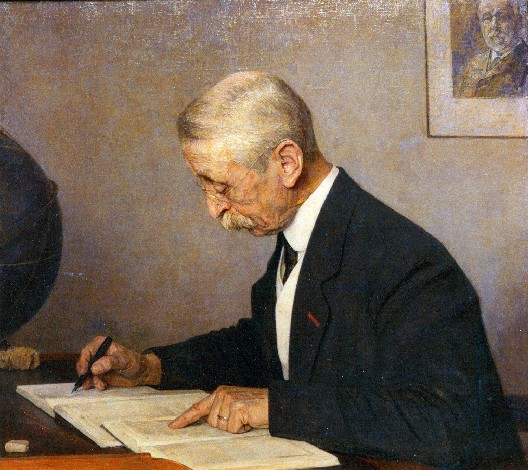
Jacobus Kapteyn on the occasion of his 40th anniversary as professor in Groningen. Sir David Gill in background. Painting by Jan Veth.

Jacobus Cornelius Kapteyn (19 January 1851 – 18 June 1922) was a Dutch astronomer. He carried out extensive studies of the Milky Way. He found that the apparent movement of stars was not randomly distributed but had two preferential directions: the two star streams. This discovery was later reinterpreted as evidence for galactic rotation. Kapteyn also suggested that these stellar velocities could be used to find the amount of non-luminous matter in the galaxy, which his student, Jan Oort, measured in 1932, referring to it as "invisible matter".

== Biography ==
Kapteyn was born in Barneveld to Gerrit J. and Elisabeth C. (née Koomans) Kapteyn, and went to the University of Utrecht to study mathematics and physics in 1868. In 1875, after having finished his thesis, he worked for three years at the Leiden Observatory, before becoming the first Professor of Astronomy and Theoretical Mechanics at the University of Groningen, where he remained until his retirement in 1921. In 1888 he became a member of the Royal Netherlands Academy of Arts and Sciences.

Between 1896 and 1900, lacking an observatory, he volunteered to measure photographic plates taken by David Gill, who was conducting a photographic survey of Southern Hemisphere stars at the Royal Observatory at the Cape of Good Hope. The results of this collaboration was the publication of Cape Photographic Durchmusterung, a catalog listing positions and magnitudes for 454,875 stars in the Southern Hemisphere.

In 1897, as part of the above work, he discovered Kapteyn's Star. It had the highest proper motion of any star known until the discovery of Barnard's Star in 1916.

In 1904, studying the proper motions of stars, Kapteyn reported that these were not random, as it was believed in that time; stars could be divided into two streams, moving in nearly opposite directions. It was later realized that Kapteyn's data had been the first evidence of the rotation of the Milky Way Galaxy, which ultimately led to the finding of galactic rotation by Bertil Lindblad and Jan Oort.

In 1906, Kapteyn launched a plan for a major study of the distribution of stars in the Galaxy, using counts of stars in different directions. The plan involved measuring the apparent magnitude, spectral type, radial velocity, and proper motion of stars in 206 zones. This enormous project was the first coordinated statistical analysis in astronomy and involved the cooperation of over forty different observatories.

He was awarded the James Craig Watson Medal in 1913. Kapteyn later retired in 1921 at the age of seventy, but on the request of his former student and director of Leiden Observatory Willem de Sitter, Kapteyn went back to Leiden to assist in upgrading the observatory to contemporary astronomical standards.

His life's work, First attempt at a theory of the arrangement and motion of the sidereal system, was published in 1922, and described a lens-shaped island universe of which the density decreased away from the center, now known as the Kapteyn Universe. In his model the Galaxy was thought to be 40,000 light years in size, the Sun being relatively close (2,000 light years) to its center. The model was valid at high galactic latitudes but failed in the galactic plane because of the lack of knowledge of interstellar absorption.

It was only after Kapteyn's death, in Amsterdam, that Robert Trumpler determined that the amount of interstellar reddening was actually much greater than had been assumed. This discovery increased the estimate of the galaxy's size to 100,000 light years, with the Sun replaced to a distance of 30,000 light years from the Galactic Center.

The astronomy institute of the University of Groningen is named after Kapteyn. A street in the city of Groningen is also named after Kapteyn: the J.C. Kapteynlaan. And the Isaac Newton Group of Telescopes on La Palma in the Canary Islands named the Jacobus Kapteyn Telescope (JKT) after him.

His daughter Henrietta (1881–1956) married astronomer Ejnar Hertzsprung.

== Honours ==
Awards

- Gold Medal of the Royal Astronomical Society (1902)
- James Craig Watson Medal (1913)
- Bruce Medal (1913)

Named after him

- Kapteyn (crater) on the Moon
- Asteroid 818 Kapteynia
- Kapteyn's Star
- Kapteyn Astronomical Institute at the University of Groningen
- Jacobus Kapteyn Telescope (JKT) at La Palma, one of the Canary Islands
- Kapteyn Package, Astronomical package for Python
