= British Aerospace Sea Harrier =

British VTOL jet fighter aircraft

Sea Harrier
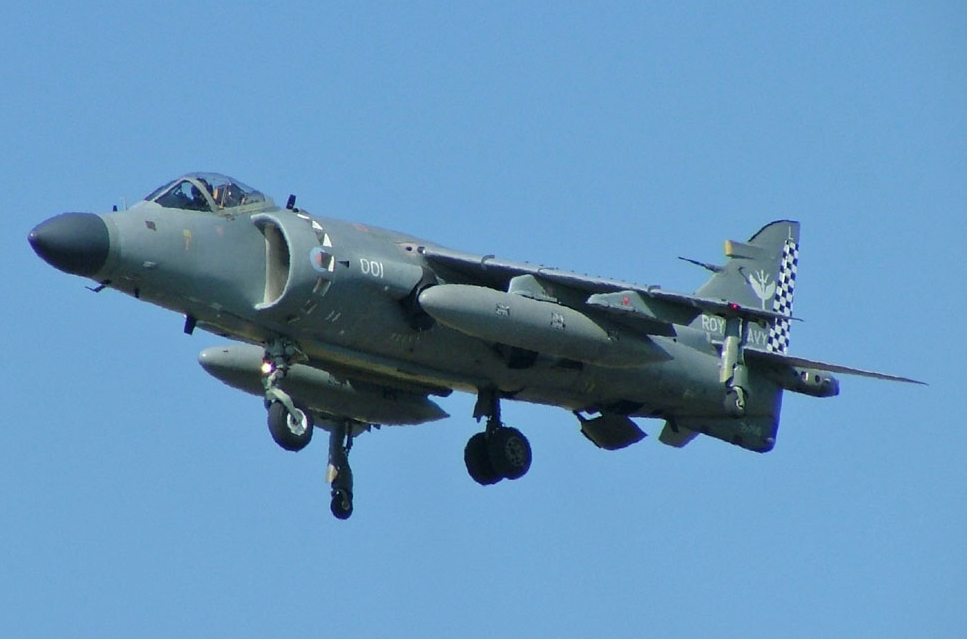
- A Sea Harrier FA2 of 801 NAS in flight at the Royal International Air Tattoo.

General information
- Type: V/STOL strike fighter
- National origin: United Kingdom
- Manufacturer: Hawker Siddeley; British Aerospace
- Status: Retired
- Primary users: Royal Navy (historical) Indian Navy (historical)
- Number built: 98

History
- Introduction date: 20 August 1978 (FRS1); 10 December 1983 (FRS51); 2 April 1993 (FA2)
- Retired: March 2006 (Royal Navy); 6 March 2016 (Indian Navy)
- Developed from: Hawker Siddeley Harrier

The British Aerospace Sea Harrier is a naval jet fighter, reconnaissance and attack aircraft. The short take-off and vertical landing (STOVL) and vertical take-off and landing (VTOL) craft is the second member of the Harrier family developed. It first entered service with the Royal Navy in April 1980 as the Sea Harrier FRS1 and became informally known as the "Shar". Unusual in an era in which most naval and land-based air superiority fighters were large and supersonic, the principal role of the subsonic Sea Harrier was to provide air defence for Royal Navy task groups centred around the aircraft carriers.

The Sea Harrier served in the Falklands War and the Balkans conflicts; on all occasions it mainly operated from aircraft carriers positioned within the conflict zone. Its usage in the Falklands War was its most high profile and important success, when it was the only fixed-wing fighter available to protect the British Task Force. The Sea Harriers shot down 20 enemy aircraft during the conflict; 2 Sea Harriers were lost to enemy ground fire. They were also used to launch ground attacks in the same manner as the Harriers operated by the Royal Air Force.

The Sea Harrier was marketed for sales abroad, but India was the only other operator after attempts to sell the aircraft to Argentina and Australia were unsuccessful. A second, updated version for the Royal Navy was made in 1993 as the Sea Harrier FA2, improving its air-to-air abilities and weapons compatibilities, along with a more powerful engine; this version was manufactured until 1998. The aircraft was withdrawn from service early by the Royal Navy in 2006, but remained in service with the Indian Navy for a further decade until its retirement in 2016.

== Development ==
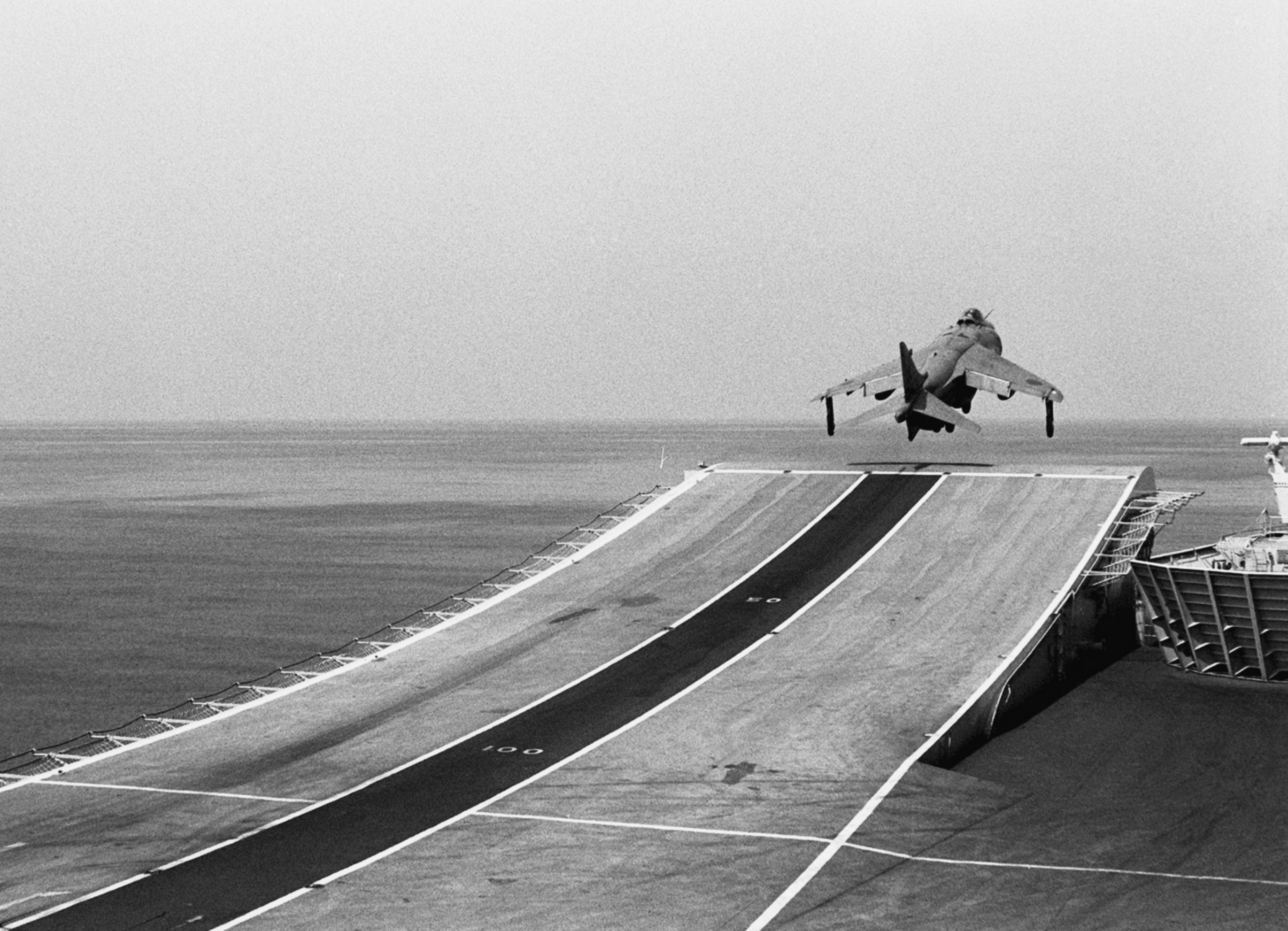
Harrier FRS.1 of 800 NAS using the ski-jump during takeoff from HMS Invincible in 1990

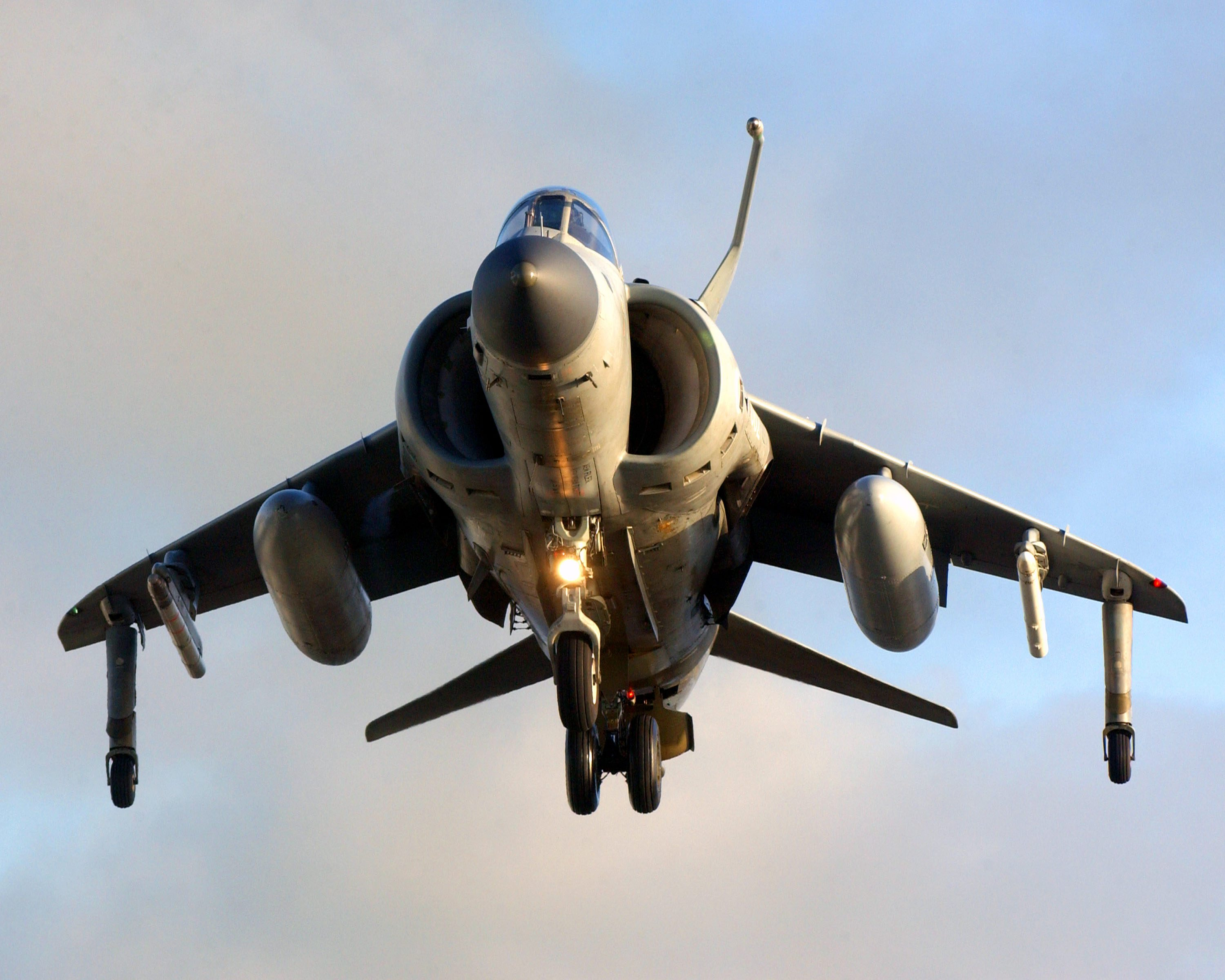
Harrier FA2 hovering. Bolt-on refuelling probe, top right

In the post-World War II era, the Royal Navy began contracting in size. By 1960, the last battleship, HMS Vanguard, was retired from the Navy, having been in service for less than fifteen years. In 1966 the planned CVA-01 class of large aircraft carriers was cancelled. During this time, requirements within the Royal Navy began to form for a vertical and/or short take-off and landing (V/STOL) carrier-based interceptor to replace the de Havilland Sea Vixen. The first V/STOL tests on a ship began with a Hawker Siddeley P.1127 landing on HMS Ark Royal in 1963.

A second concept for the future of naval aviation emerged in the early 1970s when the first of a new class of "through deck cruisers" was planned. These were very carefully and politically designated as cruisers, deliberately avoiding the term "aircraft carrier" to increase the chances of funding in a political climate hostile to expensive capital ships. The resulting Invincible-class carriers were considerably smaller than the CVA-01 design, but came to be widely recognised as aircraft carriers. Almost immediately upon their construction, a ski-jump was added to the end of the 170-metre deck, enabling the carriers to effectively operate a small number of V/STOL jets.

The naval staff were able to build an effective political argument for acquiring V/STOL aircraft on the grounds that anti-submarine groups operating in the NATO Atlantic area, the intended main role of the through-deck cruisers, would be vulnerable to attack by Soviet anti-ship missiles. These could be launched at a considerable distance by a submarine or surface ship but needed to be guided in by a maritime patrol aircraft; fast jets carried onboard would be able to shoot these down. No mention was made of the other capabilities that these aircraft would have.

The Royal Air Force's Hawker Siddeley Harrier GR1s had entered service in April 1969. A navalized variant of the Harrier was developed by Hawker Siddeley to serve on the upcoming ships; this became the Sea Harrier. In 1975, the Royal Navy ordered 24 Sea Harrier FRS.1 (standing for 'Fighter, Reconnaissance, Strike') aircraft, the first of which entered service in 1978. During this time, Hawker Siddeley became part of British Aerospace through nationalisation in 1977. By the time the prototype Sea Harrier was flown at Dunsfold on 20 August 1978, the order had been increased to 34. The Sea Harrier was declared operational in 1981 on board the first Invincible-class ship HMS Invincible, and further aircraft joined the ageing HMS Hermes aircraft carrier later that year.

In 1984, approval was given to upgrade of the fleet to FRS.2 standard (later known as FA2) following the lessons learned during the aircraft's deployment in the 1982 Falklands War. The first flight of the prototype took place in September 1988 and a contract was signed for 29 upgraded aircraft in December that year. In 1990, the Navy ordered 18 new-build FA2s at a unit cost of around £12 million, four further upgraded aircraft were ordered in 1994. The first aircraft was delivered on 2 April 1993.

== Design ==
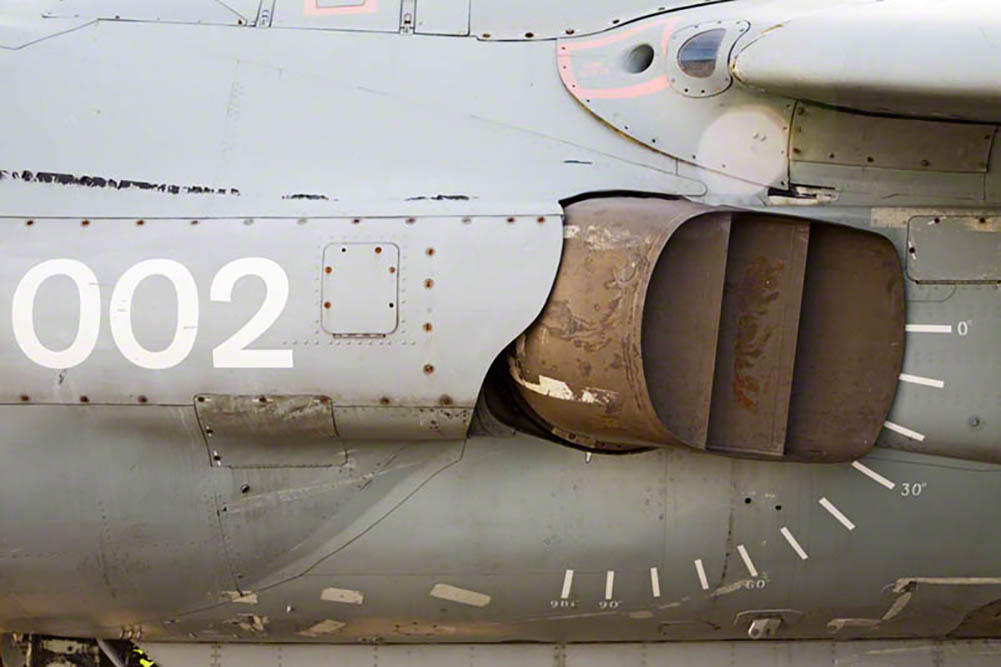
Sea Harrier FA2 ZA195 (upgrade) vector thrust nozzle – distinguishing feature of the jump jet

Locations of the four nozzles at the sides of the Pegasus engine.

The Sea Harrier is a subsonic aircraft designed for strike, reconnaissance and fighter roles. It features a single Rolls-Royce Pegasus turbofan engine with two intakes and four vectorable nozzles. It has two landing gear on the fuselage and two outrigger landing gears on the wings. The Sea Harrier is equipped with four wing and three fuselage pylons for carrying weapons and external fuel tanks. The use of the ski jump allowed the aircraft to take off from a short flight deck with a heavier payload than would otherwise be possible, although it can also take off like a conventional loaded fighter without thrust vectoring from a normal airport runway.

The Sea Harrier was largely based on the Harrier GR3, but was modified to have a raised cockpit with a "bubble" canopy for greater visibility and an extended forward fuselage to accommodate the Ferranti Blue Fox radar. Parts were changed to use corrosion resistant alloys, or coatings were added, to protect against the marine environment. After the Falklands War, the Sea Harrier was fitted with the Sea Eagle anti-ship missile.

The Blue Fox radar was seen by some critics as having comparatively low performance for what was available at the time of procurement. The Sea Harrier FA2 was fitted with the Blue Vixen radar, which was described as one of the most advanced pulse doppler radar systems in the world. The Blue Vixen formed the basis of the Eurofighter Typhoon's CAPTOR radar. The Sea Harrier FA2 carried the AIM-120 AMRAAM missile, the first UK aircraft with this capability. An upgraded model of the Pegasus engine, the Pegasus Mk 106, was used in the Sea Harrier FA2. In response to the threat of radar-based anti-aircraft weapons electronic countermeasures were added. Other improvements included an increased air-to-air weapons load, look-down radar, increased range, and improved cockpit displays.

The Sea Harrier's cockpit includes a conventional centre stick arrangement and left-hand throttle. In addition to normal flight controls, the Harrier has a lever for controlling the direction of the four vectorable nozzles. The nozzles point rearward with the lever in the forward position for horizontal flight. With the lever back, the nozzles point downward for vertical takeoff or landing. The utility of the vertical landing capability of the Sea Harrier was demonstrated in an incident on 6 June 1983, when Sub Lieutenant Ian Watson lost contact with the aircraft carrier HMS Illustrious and had to land Sea Harrier ZA176 on the foredeck of the Spanish cargo ship Alraigo (The Alraigo incident).

In 1998, the UK Defence Evaluation and Research Agency test-fitted an FA2 with AVPRO UK Ltd's Exint pods, small underwing compartments intended to be used for deployment of special forces.

In 2005, a Sea Harrier was modified with an 'Autoland' system to allow the fighter to perform a safe vertical landing without any pilot interaction. Despite the pitching of a ship posing a natural problem, the system was designed to be aware of such data, and successfully performed a landing at sea in May 2005.

== Operational history ==
=== Royal Navy ===
==== Entry into service ====
The first three Sea Harriers were a development batch and were used for clearance trials. The first production aircraft was delivered to RNAS Yeovilton in 1979 to form an Intensive Flying Trials Unit, 700A Naval Air Squadron. In March 1980, the Intensive Flying Trials Unit became 899 Naval Air Squadron and would act as the landborne headquarters unit for the type. The first operational squadron, 800 Naval Air Squadron, was also formed in March 1980, initially to operate from HMS Invincible before it transferred to HMS Hermes. In January 1981, a second operational squadron 801 Naval Air Squadron was formed to operate from HMS Invincible.

==== Falklands War ====
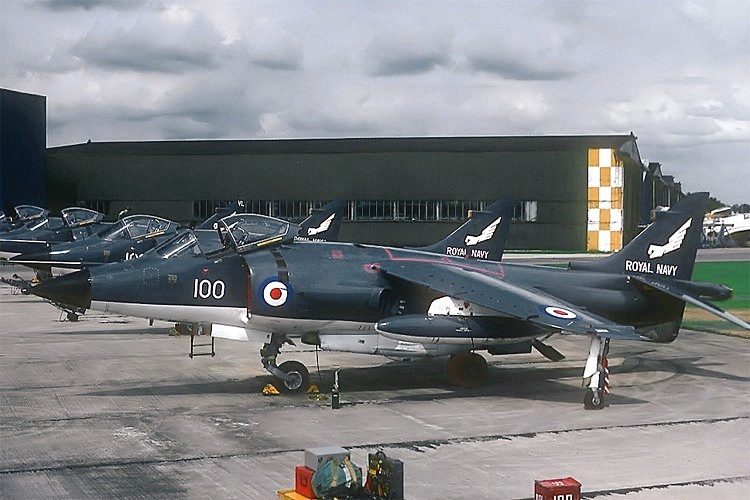
Sea Harrier at RNAS Yeovilton. The pre-Falklands War paint scheme seen here was altered by painting over the white undersides and markings en route to the islands.

Sea Harriers took part in the Falklands War (Spanish: Guerra de las Malvinas) of 1982, flying from HMS Invincible and HMS Hermes. The Sea Harriers performed the primary air defence role with a secondary role of ground attack; the RAF Harrier GR3 provided the main ground attack force. A total of 28 Sea Harriers and 14 Harrier GR3s were deployed in the theatre. The Sea Harrier squadrons shot down 20 Argentine aircraft in air-to-air combat with no air-to-air losses, although two Sea Harriers were lost to ground fire and four to accidents. Out of the total Argentine air losses, 28% were shot down by Harriers. One Sea Harrier alone, flown by RAF Flight Lieutenant David Morgan, shot down two Skyhawks in a single encounter, another being Lieutenant Stephen Thomas shooting down 2 Argentine Air Force Mirage V "Daggers" with Sidewinder missiles on one mission on May 21, 1982.

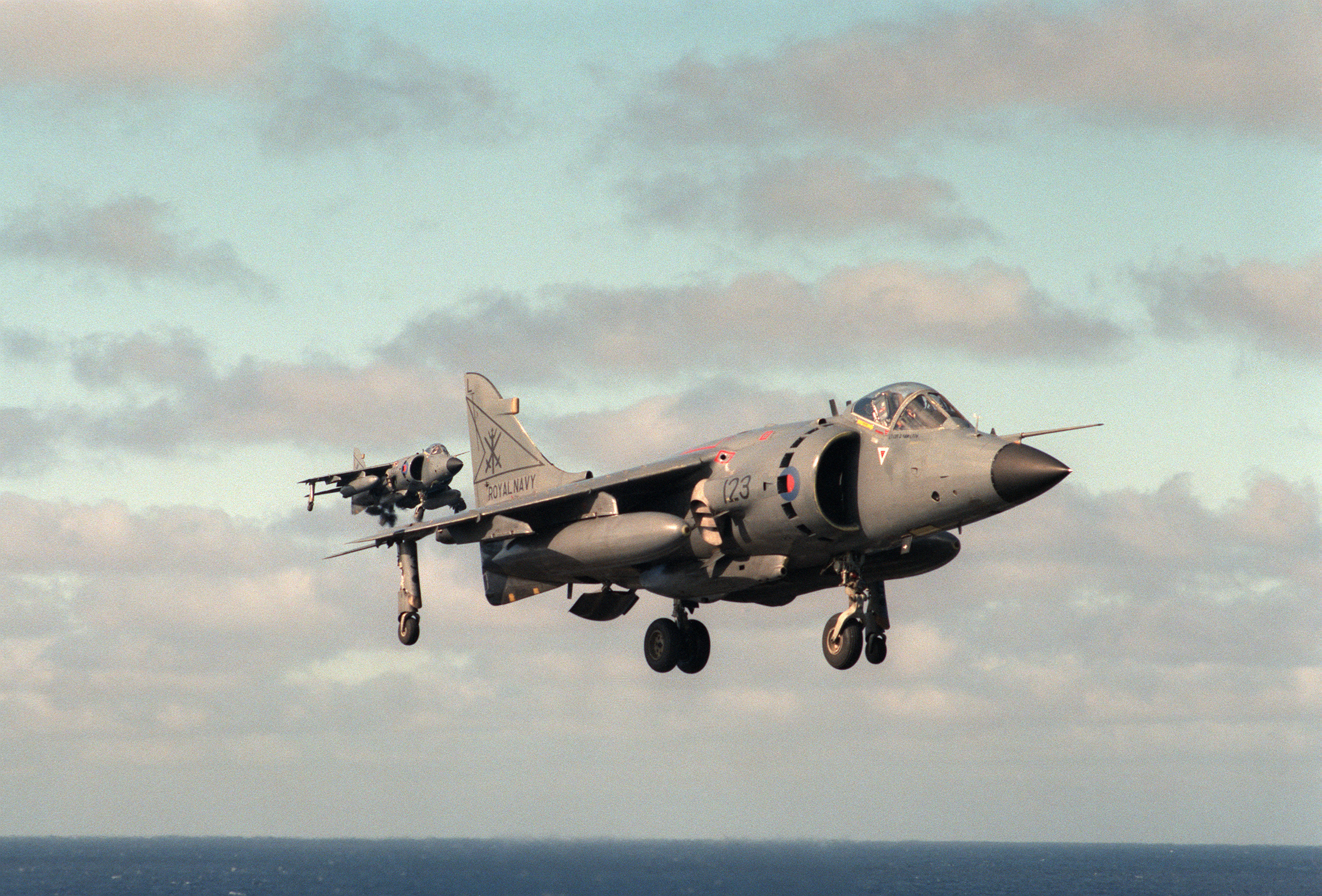
800 NAS Sea Harrier FRS1 from HMS Illustrious in post-Falklands War low-visibility paint scheme.

British aircraft received fighter control from warships in San Carlos Water, although its effectiveness was limited by their being stationed close to the islands, which severely limited the effectiveness of their radar. The differences in tactics and training between 800 Squadron and 801 Squadron have been a point of criticism, suggesting that the losses of several ships were preventable had Sea Harriers from Hermes been used more effectively.

Both sides' aircraft were operating in adverse conditions. Argentine aircraft were forced to operate from the mainland because airfields on the Falklands were only suited for propeller-driven aircraft. The bombing of Port Stanley airport by a British Vulcan bomber was also a consideration in the Argentinians' decision to operate them from afar. As most Argentine aircraft lacked in-flight refuelling capability, they were forced to operate at the limit of their range. The Sea Harriers also had limited fuel reserves due to the tactical decision to station the British carriers out of Exocet missile range and the dispersal of the fleet. The result was that an Argentine aircraft only had five minutes over the islands to search for and attack an objective, while a Sea Harrier could stay near to 30 minutes waiting in the Argentine approach corridors and provide Combat Air Patrol coverage for up to an hour.

The Sea Harriers were outnumbered by the available Argentinian aircraft, and were on occasion deterred by the activities of the Escuadrón Fénix or civilian jet aircraft used by the Argentine Air Force. They had to operate without a fleet airborne early warning and control (AEW&C) system that would have been available to a full NATO fleet in which the Royal Navy had expected to operate, which was a significant weakness in the operational environment. It is now known that British units based in Chile did provide early radar warning to the Task Force. Nonetheless, the lack of AEW&C cover resulted in air superiority as opposed to air supremacy; the Sea Harriers could not prevent Argentine attacks during day or night nor could they completely stop the daily C-130 Hercules transports' night flights to the islands.

Two main factors contributed to the failure of Argentinian fighter pilots to shoot down a Sea Harrier. Firstly, although the Mirage III and Dagger jets were faster, the Sea Harrier was considerably more manoeuvrable. Secondly, the Harrier employed the latest AIM-9L Sidewinder missiles and the Blue Fox radar. Two other hypotheses about the Argentines' lack of success have been disproven. Firstly, contrary to contemporary reports, "viffing" was not used by Harrier pilots in dogfights; the manoeuvre was regarded within the FAA as a tactic to be used only in extreme emergency, that would likely only be effective against opponents with little knowledge of the Harrier's capabilities. Secondly, contrary to contemporary reports, Argentinian pilots seldom released air-to-air missiles and other weapons outside of their effective range and other operating parameters. This belief may have resulted from British observers witnessing Mirages/Daggers dropping external fuel tanks, to improve their manoeuvrability.

During the conflict, the principal threats to Harrier aircraft were assessed as surface-to-air missiles (SAMs), anti-aircraft artillery, and small arms fire, with four Harrier GR.3s and six Sea Harriers lost.

Aircraft type & serial	Pilot	Date	Location	Cause / Weapon
Sea Harrier XZ450	Lt Nick Taylor †	4 May 1982	Goose Green area	Shot down by 35mm Oerlikon AA fire
Sea Harrier XZ452	Lt Cdr John Eyton-Jones †	6 May 1982	South East of Falklands	Night collision with XZ453 (accident)
Sea Harrier XZ453	Lt Alan Curtis †	6 May 1982	South East of Falklands	Night collision with XZ452 (accident)
Harrier GR.3 XZ972	Flt‑Lt Jeff Glover	21 May 1982	Port Howard, West Falkland	Shot down by Blowpipe SAM
Sea Harrier ZA192	Cdr Gordon Batt †	23 May 1982	North East of Falklands	Crashed on take-off (possible mechanical failure)
Harrier GR.3 XZ988	Sqn Ldr Bob Iveson	27 May 1982	Near Goose Green	Hit by 35mm Oerlikon cannon AA fire or 20mm Rheinmetall
Sea Harrier ZA174	Lt Cdr Mike Broadwater	29 May 1982	HMS Invincible flight deck	Slid off deck in bad weather (accident)
Harrier GR.3 XZ963	Sqn Ldr Jerry Pook	30 May 1982	West of Port Stanley	Damaged by small-arms fire, crashed (fuel exhaustion)
Sea Harrier XZ456	Flt‑Lt Ian Mortimer	1 June 1982	South of Stanley airfield	Shot down by Roland SAM
Harrier GR.3 XZ989	Wg Cdr Peter Squire	8 June 1982	Port San Carlos area	Mechanical failure on landing

==== Operations in the 1990s ====
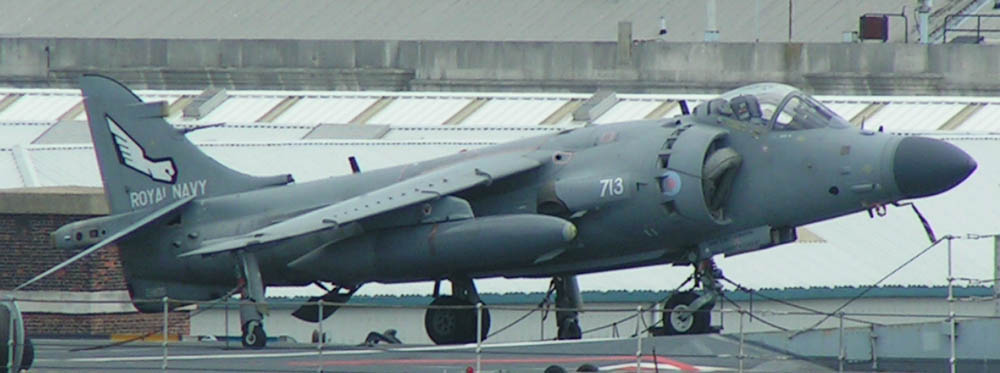
British Aerospace Sea Harrier FA2 of the Royal Navy on the flight deck of HMS Invincible

The Sea Harrier saw action in war again when it was deployed in the 1992–1995 Bosnian War. It launched raids on Serb forces and provided air-support for the international taskforce units conducting Operations Deny Flight and Deliberate Force against the Army of Republika Srpska. On 16 April 1994, a Sea Harrier of the 801 Naval Air Squadron, operating from the aircraft carrier HMS Ark Royal, was brought down by an Igla-1 surface-to-air missile fired by the Army of Republika Srpska while attempting to bomb two Bosnian Serb tanks besieging Gorazde. The pilot, Lieutenant Nick Richardson, ejected and landed in territory controlled by friendly Bosniak forces.

It was used again in the 1999 NATO campaign against the Federal Republic of Yugoslavia in Operation Allied Force, where Sea Harriers operating from Invincible frequently patrolled the airspace to keep Yugoslavian MiGs on the ground. They were also deployed on board Illustrious in 2000 as part of Operation Palliser, the British intervention in Sierra Leone.

==== Retirement ====
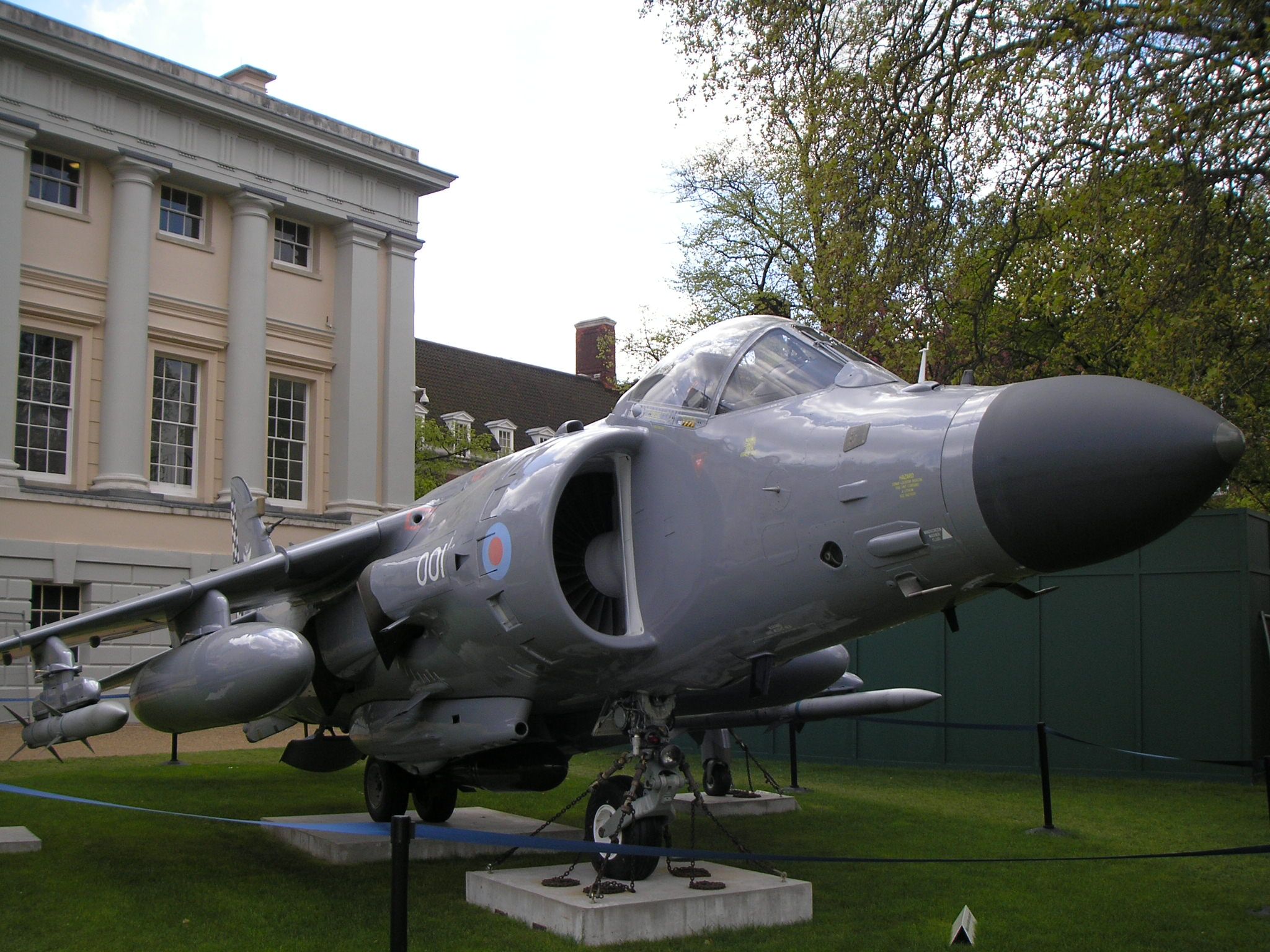
A Sea Harrier FA2 on display at the National Maritime Museum in May 2006

The UK is procuring the STOVL F-35B to be operated from the Royal Navy's Queen Elizabeth-class aircraft carriers.

The Sea Harrier was withdrawn from service in 2006 and the last remaining aircraft from 801 Naval Air Squadron were decommissioned on 29 March 2006. The MoD argued that significant expenditure would be required to upgrade the fleet for only six years of service to meet the F-35s then planned in-service date.

Both versions of Harrier experienced reduced engine performance (Pegasus Mk 106 in FA2 and Mk 105 in GR7) in the higher ambient temperatures of the Middle East, which restricted the weight of payload that the Harrier could return to the carrier in 'vertical' recoveries. This was due to the safety factors associated with aircraft landing weights. The option to install higher-rated Pegasus engines would not have been as straightforward as on the Harrier GR7 upgrade and would have likely been an expensive and slow process. Furthermore, the Sea Harriers were subject to a generally more hostile environment than land-based Harriers, with corrosive salt spray a particular problem. A number of aircraft were retained by the School of Flight Deck Operations at RNAS Culdrose.

The Royal Navy's Fleet Air Arm would continue to share the other component of Joint Force Harrier. Harrier GR7 and the upgraded Harrier GR9 were transferred to Royal Navy squadrons in 2006, but were retired in 2010 due to budget cuts.

Although withdrawn from active Royal Navy service, Sea Harriers are used to train naval aircraft handlers at the Royal Navy School of Flight Deck Operations.

=== Indian Navy ===
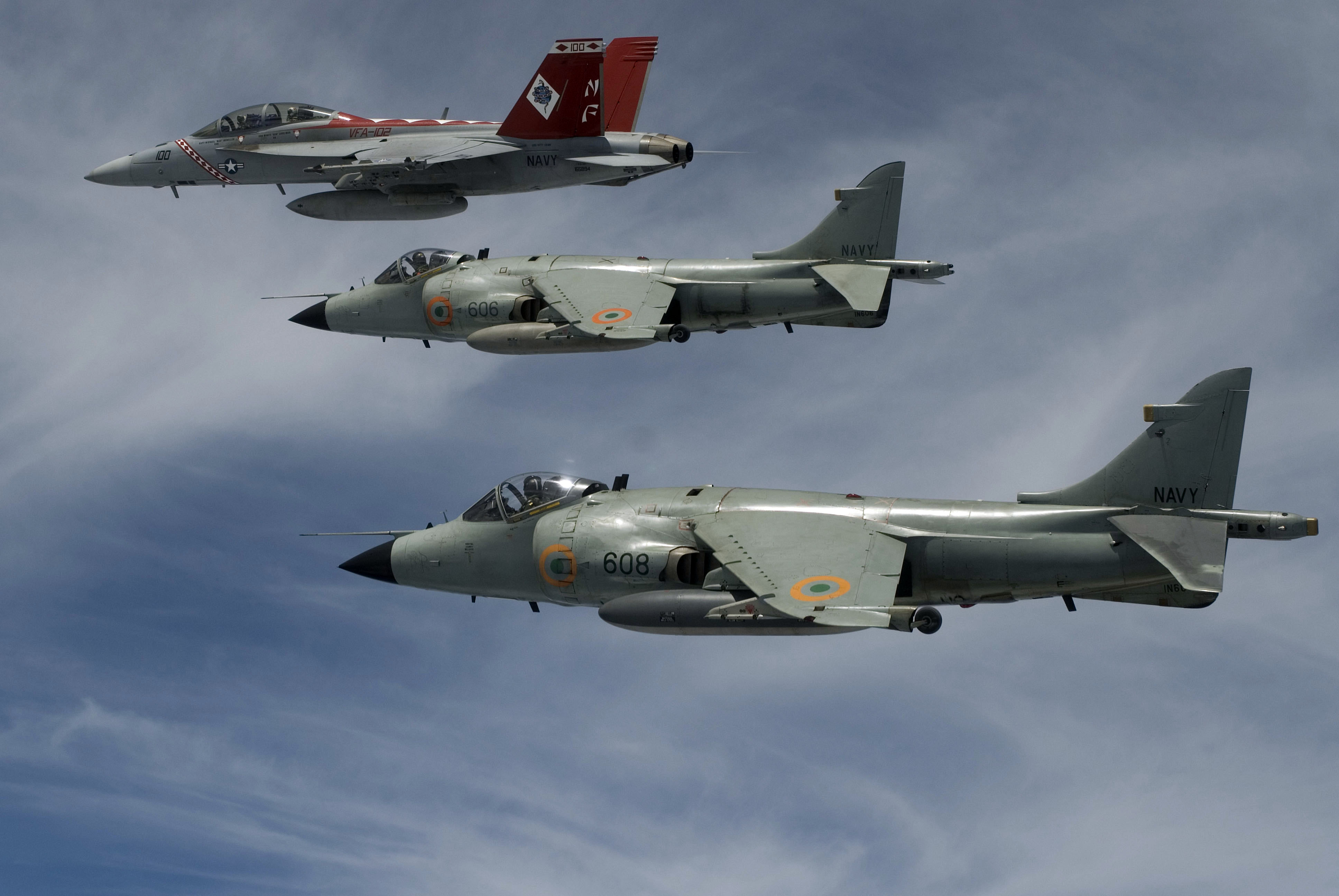
A pair of Indian Sea Harriers fly alongside an F/A-18F Super Hornet of the U.S. Navy during Malabar 2007.

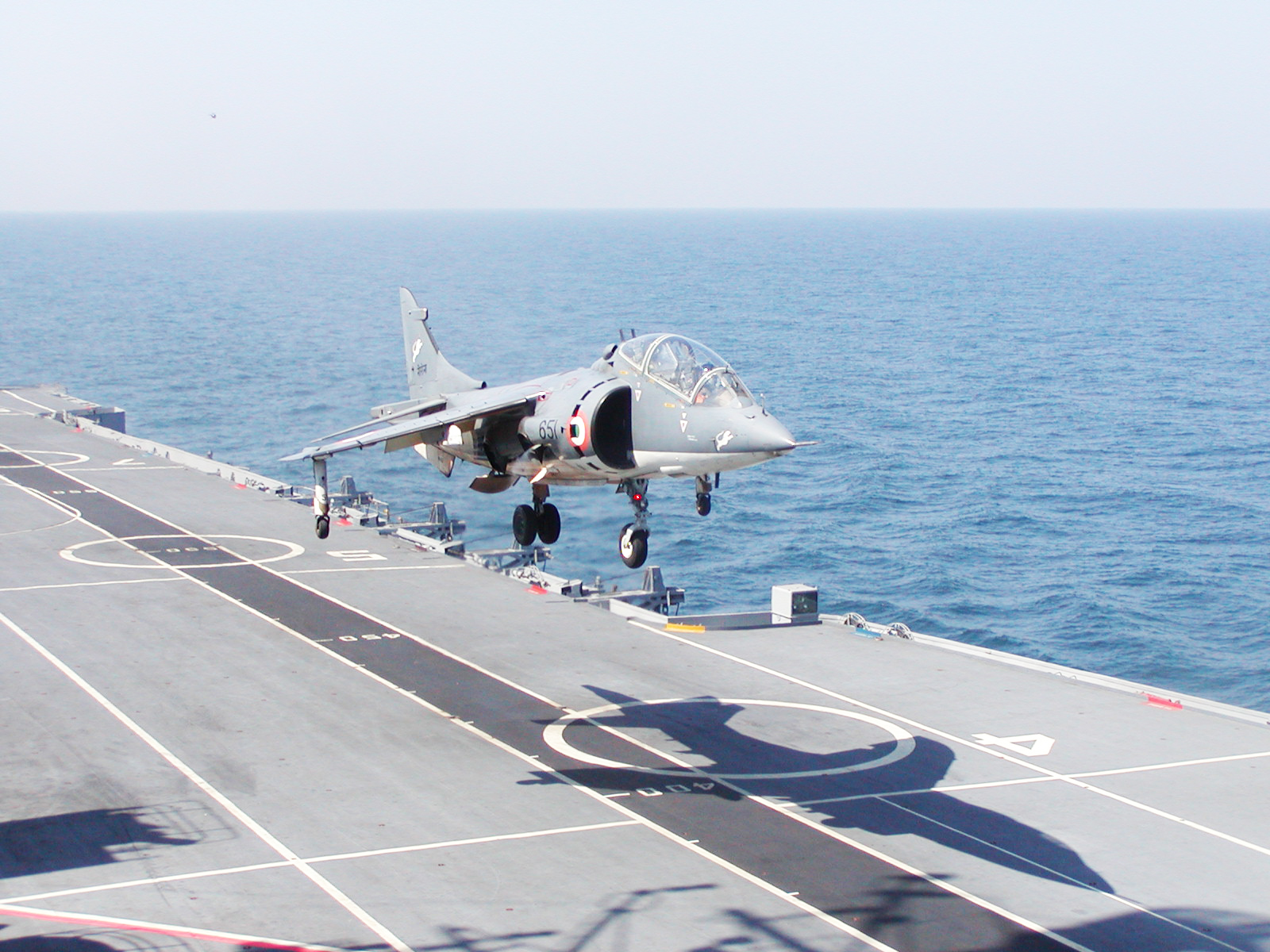
Indian Sea Harrier on takeoff

In 1977, the Indian government approved plans to acquire the Sea Harrier for the Indian Navy. In November 1979, India placed its first order for six Sea Harrier FRS Mk 51 fighters and two T Mk 60 Trainers; the first three Sea Harriers arrived at Dabolim Airport on 16 December 1983, and were inducted the same year. Ten more Sea Harriers were purchased in November 1985; eventually a total of 30 Harriers were procured, 25 for operational use and the remainder five as dual-seat trainer aircraft. Until the 1990s, significant portions of pilot training was carried out in Britain due to limited aircraft availability.

The introduction of the Sea Harrier allowed for the retirement of India's previous carrier fighter aircraft, the Hawker Sea Hawk, as well as for the Navy's aircraft carrier, INS Vikrant, to be extensively modernised between 1987 and 1989. India has operated Sea Harriers from both the aircraft carriers INS Vikrant and INS Viraat. The Sea Harrier allowed several modern missiles to be introduced into naval operations, such as the Sea Eagle anti-ship missile, and the Matra Magic air-to-air missile. Other ordnance has included 68 mm rockets, runway-denial bombs, cluster bombs, and podded 30 mm cannons.

There have been a significant number of accidents involving the Sea Harrier; this accident rate has caused approximately half the fleet to be lost with only 11 fighters remaining in service. Following a crash in August 2009, all Sea Harriers were temporarily grounded for inspection. Since the beginning of operational service in the Indian Navy, seven pilots have died in 17 crashes involving the Sea Harrier, usually during routine sorties.

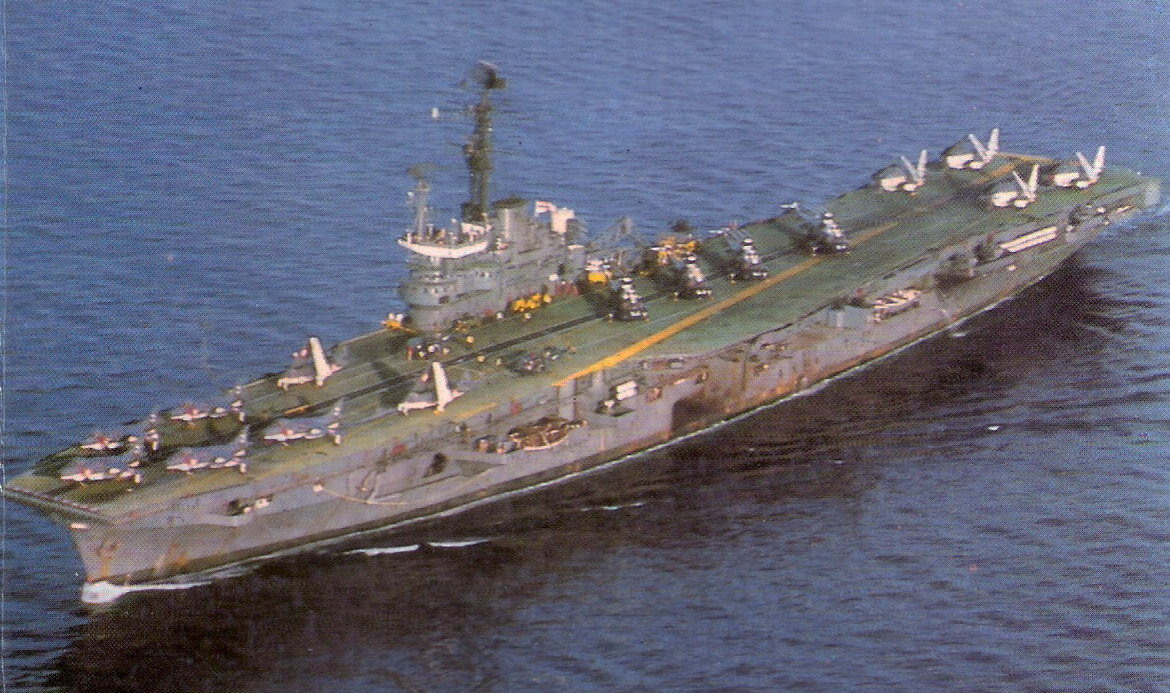
The Indian aircraft carrier INS Vikrant in the early 1980s carrying Sea Harriers, Sea Hawks, Alouette and Sea King helicopters, and Alizé ASW aircraft

In 2006, the Indian Navy expressed interest in acquiring up to eight of the Royal Navy's recently retired Sea Harrier FA2s in order to maintain their operational Sea Harrier fleet. Neither the Sea Harrier FA2's Blue Vixen radar, the radar warning receiver or AMRAAM capability would have been included; certain US software would also be uninstalled prior to shipment. By October 2006, reports emerged that the deal had not materialised due to the cost of airframe refurbishment.

In 2006, the Indian Navy started upgrading up to 15 Sea Harriers, installing the EL/M-2032 radar and the Rafael Derby medium-range air-to-air BVR missile. This enabled the Sea Harrier to remain in Indian service beyond 2012. By 2009, crashes had reduced India's fleet to 12 (from original 30).

India purchased the deactivated Russian aircraft carrier Admiral Gorshkov in 2004. After refurbishment and trials, the ship was formally inducted into the Indian Navy as INS Vikramaditya in June 2014. Sea Harriers operated from INS Viraat for the last time on 6 March 2016.

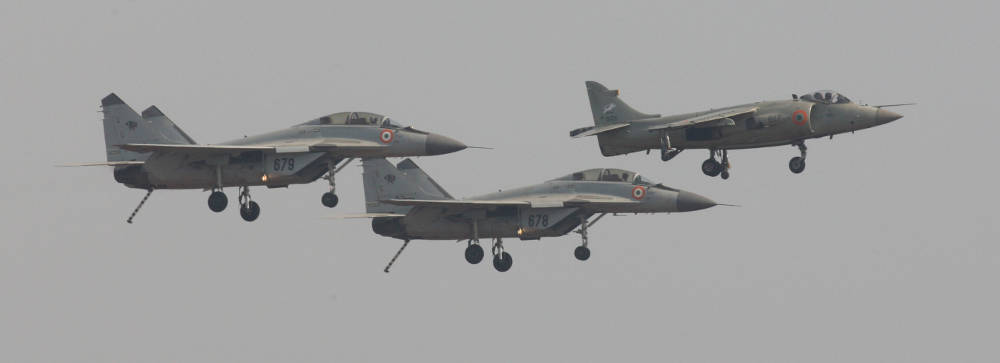
Indian Naval Sea-harriers flying in formation with successor Mig-29K aircraft

On 11 May 2016, a ceremony was held at INS Hansa, Dabolim, Goa to commemorate the phasing out of Sea Harriers from INAS 300 "White Tigers" and their replacement by the MiG-29K/KUB fighters. Aircraft of both types performed an air display at the ceremony, marking the final flight of the Sea Harriers after 33 years of service in the Indian Navy. The Indian Navy operates MiG-29K/KUB STOBAR fighters from Vikramaditya and later from the new INS Vikrant.

== Variants ==
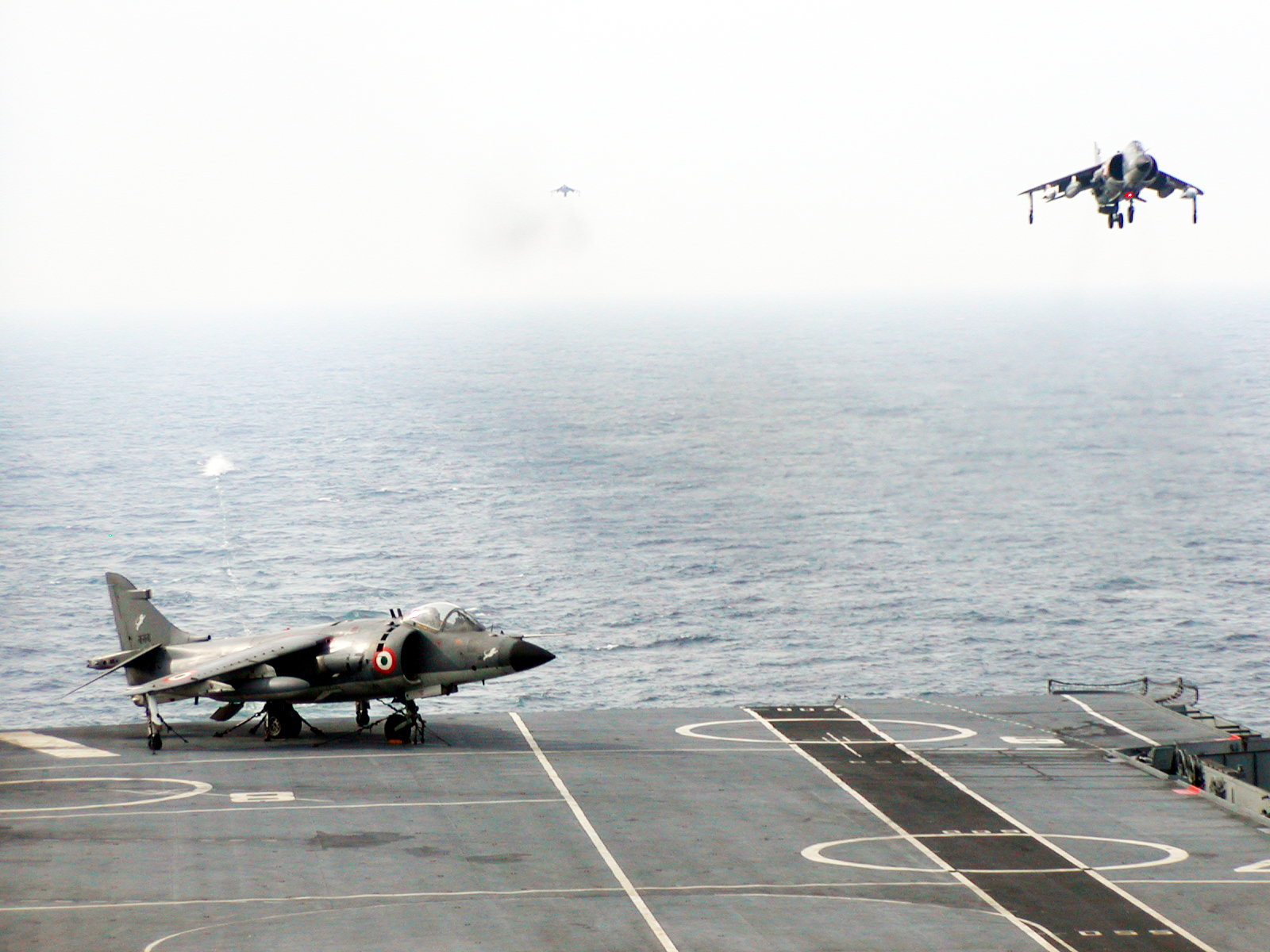
Indian Naval Harriers landing on INS Viraat

Sea Harrier FRS.1
57 FRS1s were delivered between 1978 and 1988; most survivors converted to Sea Harrier FA2 specifications from 1988.
Sea Harrier FRS.51
Single-seat fighter, reconnaissance, and attack aircraft made for the Indian Navy, similar to the British FRS1. Unlike the FRS1 Sea Harrier, it is fitted with Matra R550 Magic air-to-air missiles. These aircraft were later upgraded with the EL/M-2032 radar and the Rafael Derby BVRAAM missiles.

Sea Harrier FA2
Upgrade of FRS1 fleet in 1988, featuring the Blue Vixen pulse-doppler radar and the AIM-120 AMRAAM missile.

== Operators ==
India

- Indian Navy
  - Indian Naval Air Arm (1983–2016)
    - Indian Naval Air Squadron 300 (1983–2016)
    - Indian Naval Air Squadron 551 (1990–2005)
    - Indian Naval Air Squadron 552 (2005–2016)

United Kingdom

- Royal Navy
  - Fleet Air Arm (1978–2006)
    - 800 Naval Air Squadron (1980–2004)
    - 801 Naval Air Squadron (1981–2006)
    - 809 Naval Air Squadron (1982)
    - 899 Naval Air Squadron (1980–2005)
    - School of Flight Deck Operations (2006–2020)

== Surviving aircraft ==
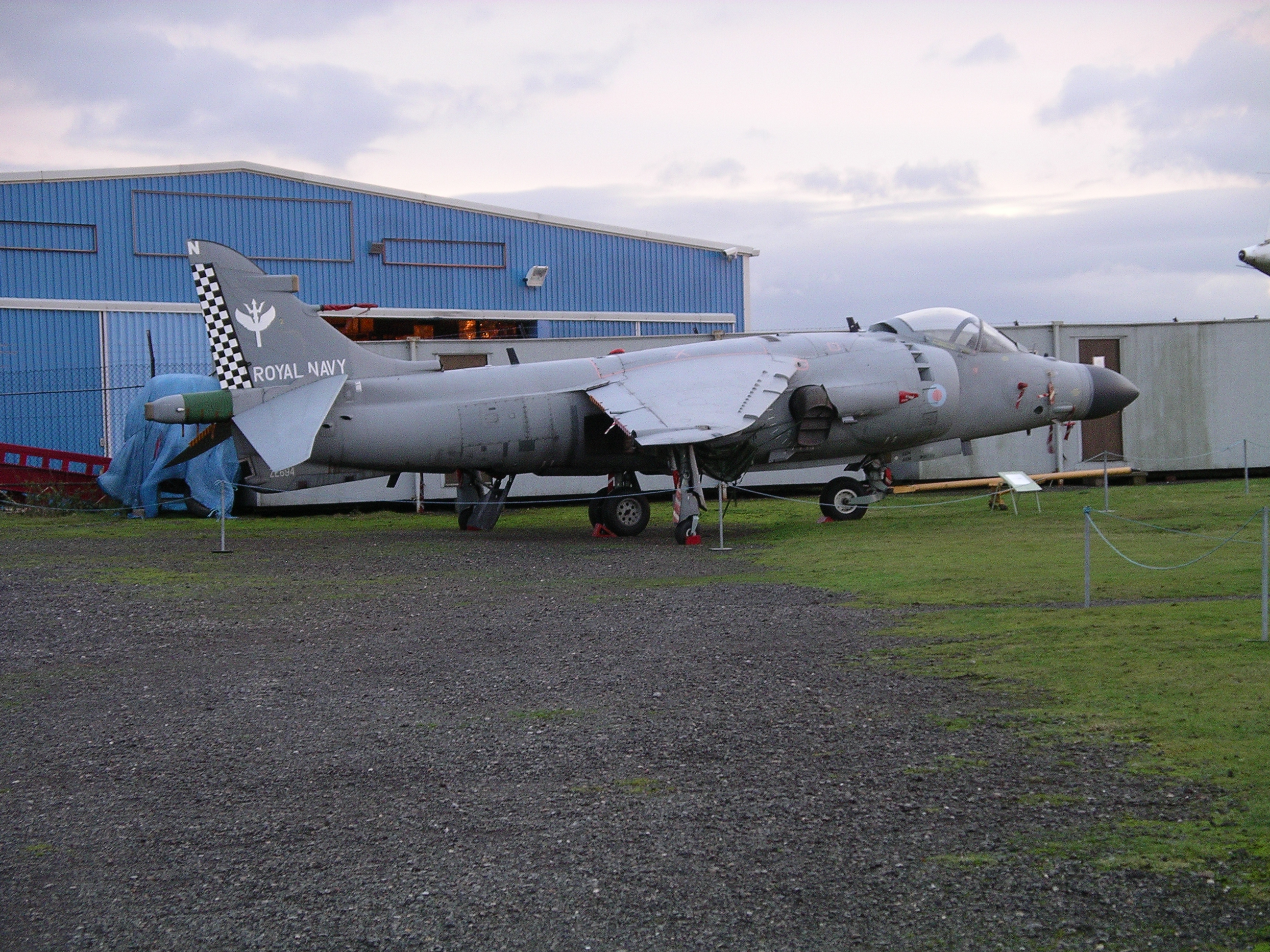
Sea Harrier FA2 ZE694 at the Midland Air Museum

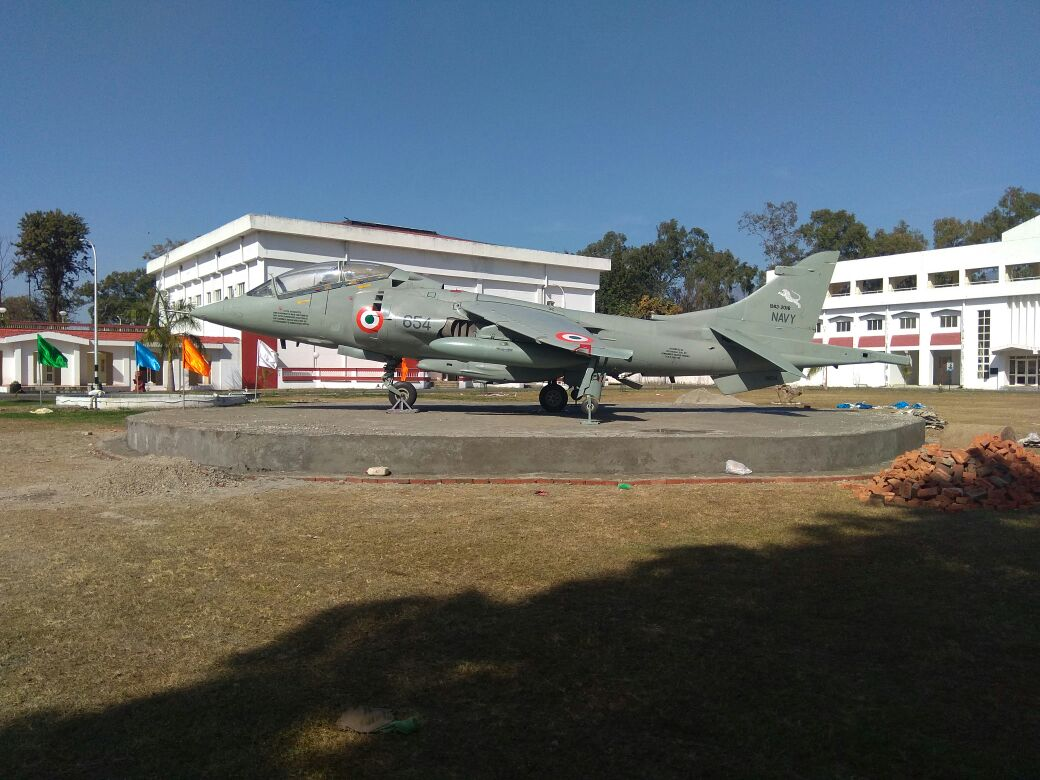
Sea Harrier T Mk. 60 IN-654 at Rashtriya Indian Military College

Several surviving Sea Harriers are held by museums and private owners, and some others are at the Royal Navy School of Flight Deck Operations at RNAS Culdrose and other military bases for training. The following is list of those not used by the military for training.

=== India ===
On display

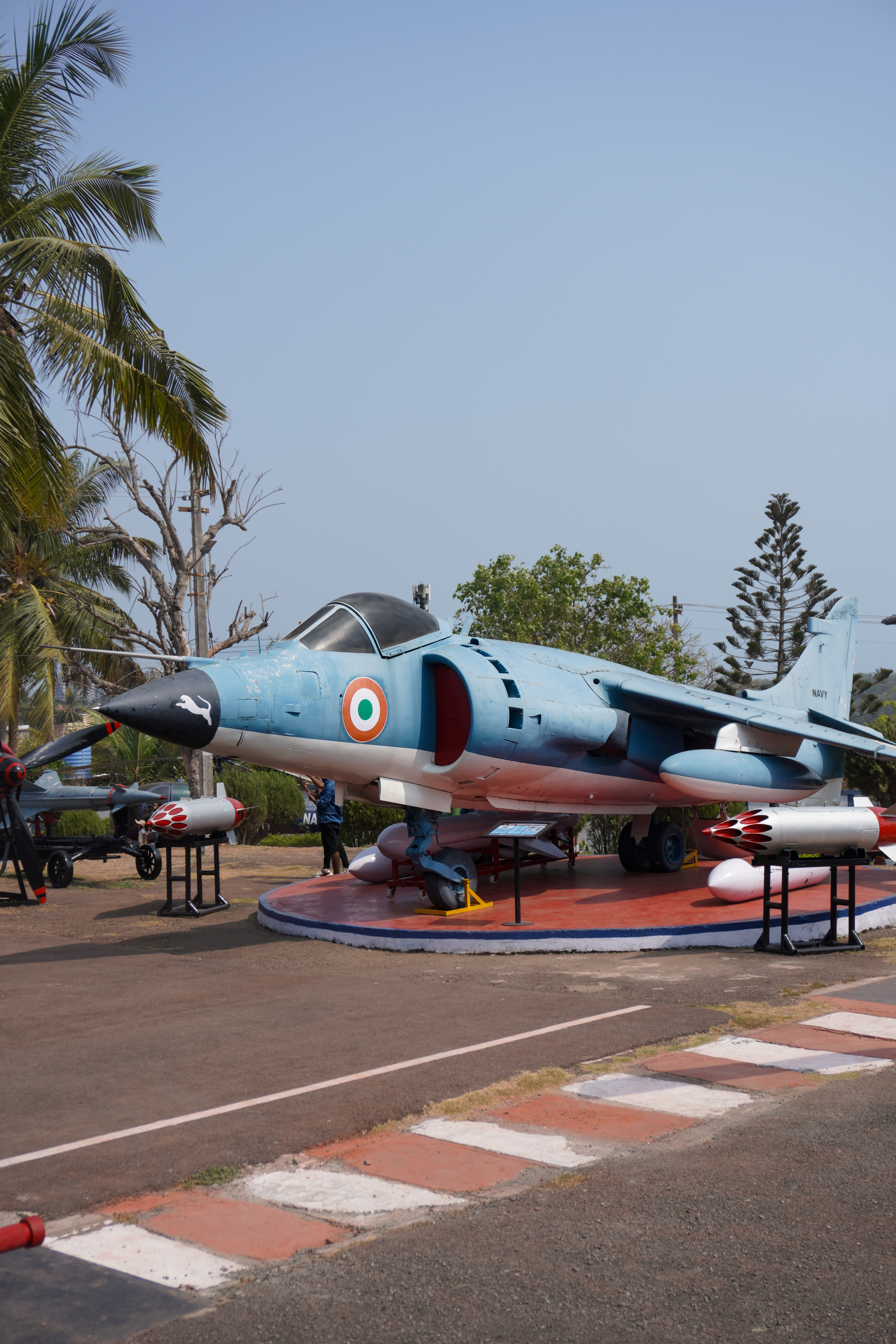
Sea Harrier FRS 51 (IN-621) on display at the Naval Aviation Museum in Goa, India

- Sea Harrier FRS 51 (IN-621) at the Naval Aviation Museum in Goa, India
- Sea Harrier T Mk.60 (IN-654) at the Rashtriya Indian Military College in Dehradun, India.
- Sea Harrier FRS 51 (IN-606) at the Sea Harrier Museum in Visakhapatnam, India.
- Sea Harrier FRS 51 (IN-617) at Bandstand Promenade, Bandra in Mumbai, India.

=== United Kingdom ===
In use

- The Royal Navy School of Flight Deck Operations still uses Harriers to train Aircraft Handlers on the dummy deck at RNAS Culdrose. Many are in a working condition, although in a limited-throttle setting. Although they are unable to fly, they still produce a loud sound to aid training.

On display

- Sea Harrier FA.2 ZD610 at Aerospace Bristol
- Sea Harrier FA.2 XZ457 at the Boscombe Down Aviation Collection, Old Sarum, Wiltshire
- Sea Harrier FRS.1 XZ493 at the Fleet Air Arm Museum, Yeovilton, Somerset
- Sea Harrier FA.2 XZ494 at the Castle Farm Camping and Caravanning, Wedmore, Somerset
- Sea Harrier FA.2 ZA175 at the Imperial War Museum Duxford, Cambridgeshire.
- Sea Harrier FA.2 ZA176 at the Newark Air Museum, Newark, Nottinghamshire
- Sea Harrier FA.2 ZD607 at the Defence Storage and Distribution Agency, Bicester, Oxfordshire
- Sea Harrier FA.2 ZD613 on the roof of a building at the Cross Green Industrial Estate, Leeds, West Yorkshire
- Sea Harrier FA.2 ZE691 at Woodford Park Industrial Estate, Winsford, Cheshire
- Sea Harrier FA.2 ZE694 at the Midland Air Museum, Coventry, Warwickshire
- Sea Harrier FA.2 XZ459 at Tangmere Military Aviation Museum in West Sussex, arrived in 2020

Stored or under restoration

- Sea Harrier FA.2 ZH803, formerly at SFDO at RNAS Culdrose, is owned by FLY HARRIER Ltd. and gained civil registration with the CAA on 7 August 2019 as G-RNFA. As of July 2020, it is listed as being at St Athan Airport in Wales.
- Sea Harrier FA.2 XZ497 with a private collection at Charlwood, Surrey
- Sea Harrier FA.2 XZ499 with the Fleet Air Arm Museum storage facility Cobham Hall, Yeovilton
- Sea Harrier FA.2 ZD582 with a private collection at Aynho, Northamptonshire
- Sea Harrier FA.2 ZD612 with a private collection at Topsham, Devon
- Sea Harrier FA.2 ZD614 with a private collection Walcott, Lincolnshire
- Sea Harrier FA.2 ZE697 at the former RAF Binbrook, Lincolnshire (as of 2016)
- Sea Harrier FA.2 ZE698 with a private collection at Charlwood, Surrey
- Sea Harrier FA.2 ZH798, formerly at RNAS Culdrose, was auctioned off in 2020 to Jet Art Aviation, who restored the aircraft to be taxi- and ground-run capable.
- Sea Harrier FA.2 ZH799 with a private collection at Ballarat, Australia.
- Sea Harrier FA.2 ZH806' and ZH812 with a dealer near Ipswich, Suffolk

=== United States ===
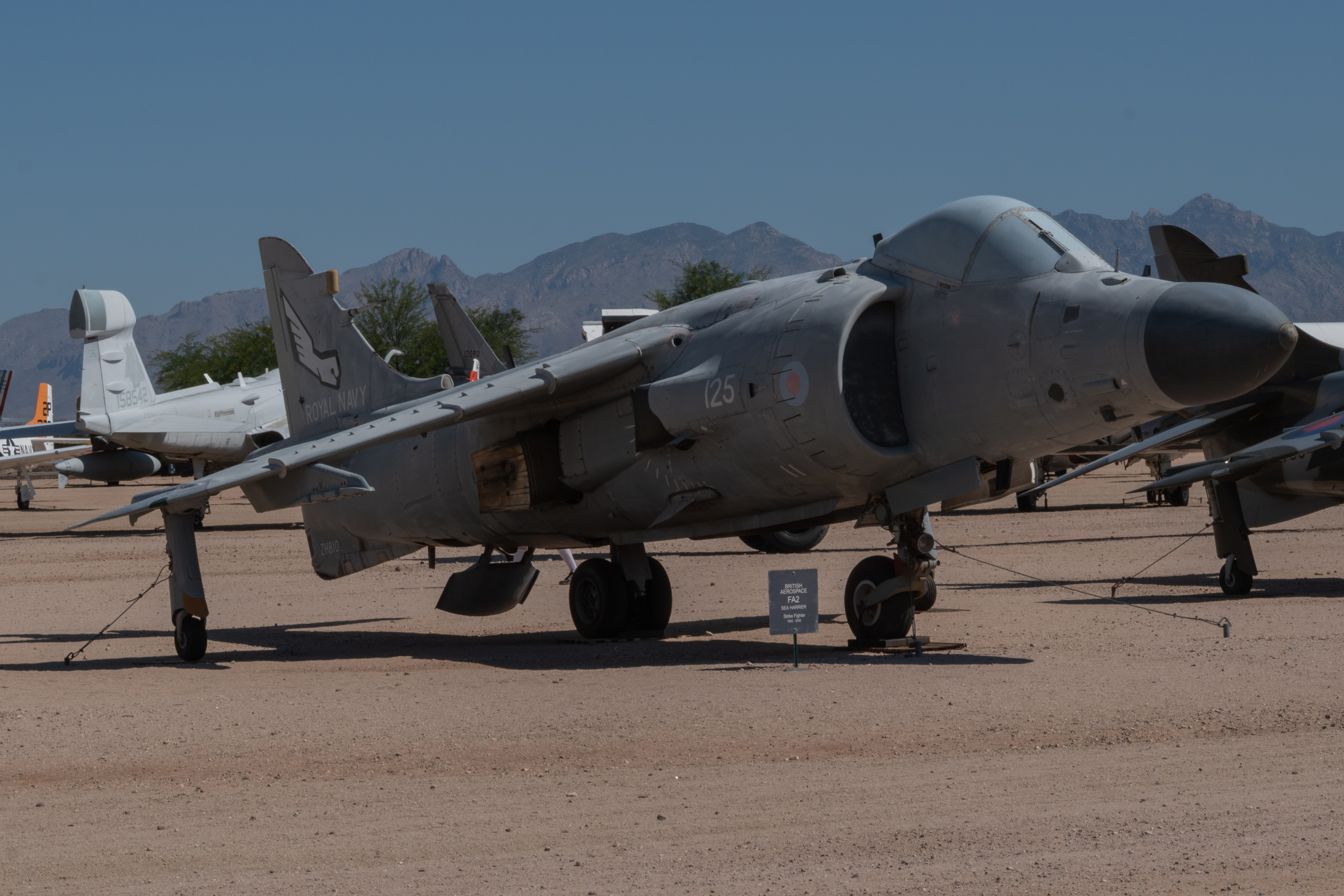
Sea Harrier FA.2 ZH810 at the Pima Air & Space Museum in 2026

Airworthy

- Sea Harrier FA2 registered N94422 (formerly Royal Navy serial number XZ439) Nalls Aviation, St Mary's County, Maryland. The former Royal Navy Sea Harrier FA2 was purchased in 2006 by Art Nalls, who spent the next two years restoring it to flying condition. In December 2007, it was damaged in a hard landing, while undergoing testing at Naval Air Station Patuxent River and had to be repaired. The aircraft made its first public appearance at an air show in Culpeper, Virginia, in October 2008. The aircraft is the only privately owned, civilian-flown Harrier in the world.

On display

- Sea Harrier FA.2 ZH810 at the Pima Air & Space Museum, Tucson, Arizona

== Specifications (Sea Harrier FA.2) ==
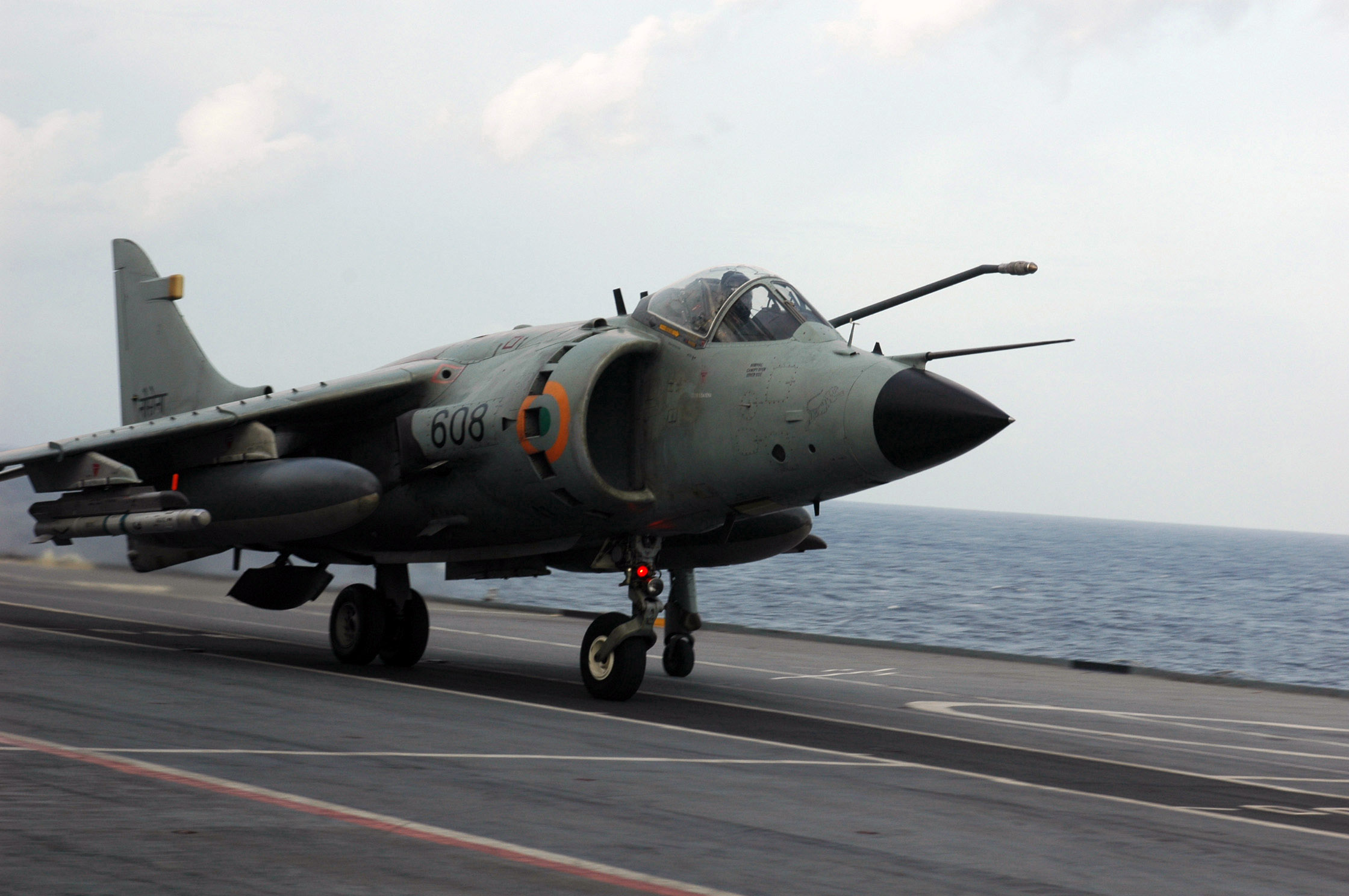
Sea Harrier FRS51. of the Indian Navy taking off from INS Viraat

Data from Jane's All the World's Aircraft 1999-00, Wilson, Bull, Donald Spick

General characteristics

- Crew: 1
- Length: 46 ft 6 in (14.17 m)

42 ft 10.25 in (13 m) with the nose folded

- Wingspan: 25 ft 3 in (7.70 m)
- Height: 12 ft 2 in (3.71 m)
- Wing area: 201.1 sq ft (18.68 m^{2})
- Airfoil: root: Hawker 10%; tip: Hawker 3.3%
- Empty weight: 14,585 lb (6,616 kg)
- Maximum fuel weight
  - Internal: 5,182 lb (2,351 kg)
  - 2× 100 imp gal (120 US gal; 455 L) drop tanks: 6,762 lb (3,067 kg)
  - 2× 190 imp gal (228 US gal; 864 L) drop tanks: 8,184 lb (3,712 kg)
  - 2× 330 imp gal (396 US gal; 1,500 L) drop tanks: 10,396 lb (4,716 kg)
- Max takeoff weight: 26,200 lb (11,884 kg) STO

17,620 lb (7,992 kg) VTO

- Fuel capacity: 630 imp gal (757 US gal; 2,864 L) internal fuel in 5 fuselage and two wing integral tanks; provision for 2× 100 imp gal (120 US gal; 455 L) combat drop tanks or 2× 190 imp gal (228 US gal; 864 L) combat drop tanks or 2× 330 imp gal (396 US gal; 1,500 L) ferry drop tanks on inboard wing pylons only.

1× 50 imp gal (60 US gal; 227 L) Demineralized water aft of the engine

- Powerplant: 1 × Rolls-Royce Pegasus 106 vectored thrust turbofan engine, 21,500 lbf (96 kN) thrust with water injection

Performance

- Maximum speed: 618 kn (711 mph, 1,145 km/h) / Mach 0.94 at sea level

578 kn (665 mph; 1,070 km/h) / Mach 0.97 at altitude

- Combat range: 400 nmi (460 mi, 740 km) high-altitude intercept with 3 minutes combat and reserves for VL

250 nmi (288 mi; 463 km) for ground attack missions

- Combat profiles: from carrier with 12° ramp at ISA + 15°C, with 20 kn (23 mph; 37 km/h) WOD

- Combat air patrol:

- Up to 1 hour 30 minutes on station at 100 nmi (115 mi; 185 km) carrying 4× AMRAAM or 2× AMRAAM + 2× ADEN cannon + 2× 190 imp gal (228 US gal; 864 L) combat drop tanks; Deck run 450 ft (137 m)

- Reconnaissance:

- Low-level cover of 130,000 sq nmi (172,158 sq mi; 445,888 km^{2}) at a radius of 525 nmi (604 mi; 972 km), out and return at medium level carrying 2× ADEN cannon + 2× 190 imp gal (228 US gal; 864 L) combat drop tanks; Deck run 350 ft (107 m)

- Surface attack:

- (hi-lo-hi) Radius of action 200 nmi (230 mi; 370 km) to missile launch carrying 2× BAe Sea Eagle + 2× ADEN cannon; Deck run 300 ft (91 m)

- Interception:

- Deck-launched against M0.9 target at 116 nmi (133 mi; 215 km), or a M1.3 target at 95 nmi (109 mi; 176 km), with initial radar detection at 230 nmi (265 mi; 426 km), at 2 minute alert status carrying 2× AMRAAM.

- Ferry range: 1,740 nmi (2,000 mi, 3,220 km)
- Service ceiling: 51,000 ft (16,000 m)
- g limits: +7.8 −4.2
- Rate of climb: 50,000 ft/min (250 m/s)
- Wing loading: 130.28 lb/sq ft (636.1 kg/m^{2})
- Thrust/weight: 0.822
- Take-off run STO: 1,000 ft (305 m) at MTOW without ramp

Armament

- Guns: 2× 30 mm (1.18 in) ADEN cannon pods under the fuselage, with 130 rounds each
- Hardpoints: 4× under-wing pylon stations, and 1 fuselage pylon on centerline plus 2 attach points for gun pods with a total capability of 8,000 lb (3,630 kg) of payload.
- Rockets: 4× Matra rocket pods with 18 SNEB 68 mm rockets each
- Missiles:
  - Air-to-air missiles:
    - AIM-9 Sidewinder
    - AIM-120 AMRAAM
  - Air-to-surface missile:
    - ALARM anti-radiation missile (ARM)
    - Martel missile ARM
  - Anti-ship missiles:
    - Sea Eagle
- Bombs: A variety of unguided iron bombs (including 3 kg and 14 kg practice bombs).
  - WE.177A
- Others:
  - reconnaissance pod or
  - 2× auxiliary drop tanks for ferry flight or extended range/loitering time

Avionics

- Ferranti Blue Vixen all-weather airborne radar
- BAE Systems AD2770 Tactical Air Navigation System
- Thales MADGE Microwave Airborne Digital Guidance Equipment
- Allied Signal AN/APX-100 mk12 IFF
- Marconi Sky Guardian 200 RWR
- 2× BAE Systems AN/ALE-40 chaff/flare dispensers

== Notable appearances in media ==
The Harrier's unique characteristics have led to it being featured a number of films and video games.

== See also ==
- Harrier jump jet, an overview of the Harrier family
- List of Harrier family losses

Related development

- Hawker Siddeley Harrier
- McDonnell Douglas AV-8B Harrier II
- British Aerospace Harrier II

Aircraft of comparable role, configuration, and era

- Boeing X-32
- Lockheed Martin F-35 Lightning II
- Yakovlev Yak-38

Related lists

- List of aircraft of the Fleet Air Arm
- List of attack aircraft
- List of fighter aircraft
