= Isaac Newton Group of Telescopes =

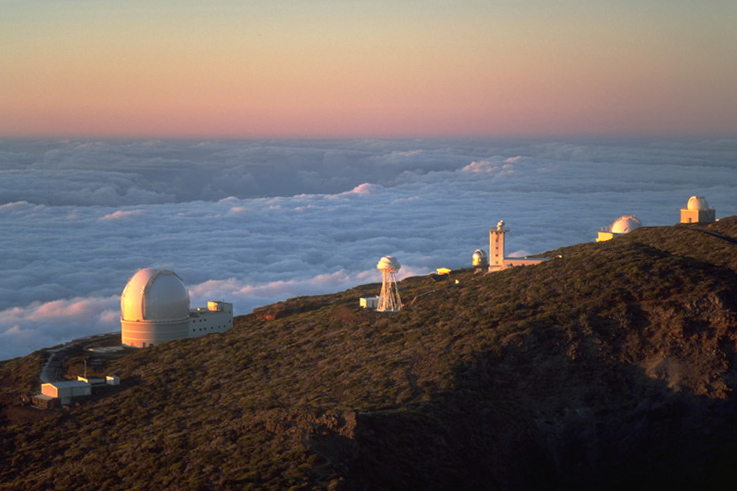
- Part of Roque de los Muchachos Observatory, including the Isaac Newton Group of Telescopes. The William Herschel Telescope is the large dome on the left, the Isaac Newton Telescope is located second from the right, and the Jacobus Kapteyn Telescope is located on the far right.
- Organization: Science and Technology Facilities Council
- Location: Spain
- Coordinates: 28°45′43″N 17°52′40″W
- Website: www.ing.iac.es
- Telescopes: Isaac Newton Telescope; Jacobus Kapteyn Telescope; William Herschel Telescope
- Location within Canary Islands

The Isaac Newton Group of Telescopes or ING consists of three optical telescopes: the William Herschel Telescope, the Isaac Newton Telescope, and the Jacobus Kapteyn Telescope, operated by a collaboration between the UK Science and Technology Facilities Council, the Dutch NWO and the Spanish IAC. The telescopes are located at Roque de los Muchachos Observatory on La Palma in the Canary Islands.

== See also ==
- Isaac Newton
