= Harrier jump jet =

Multirole combat aircraft family by Hawker Siddeley, later British Aerospace

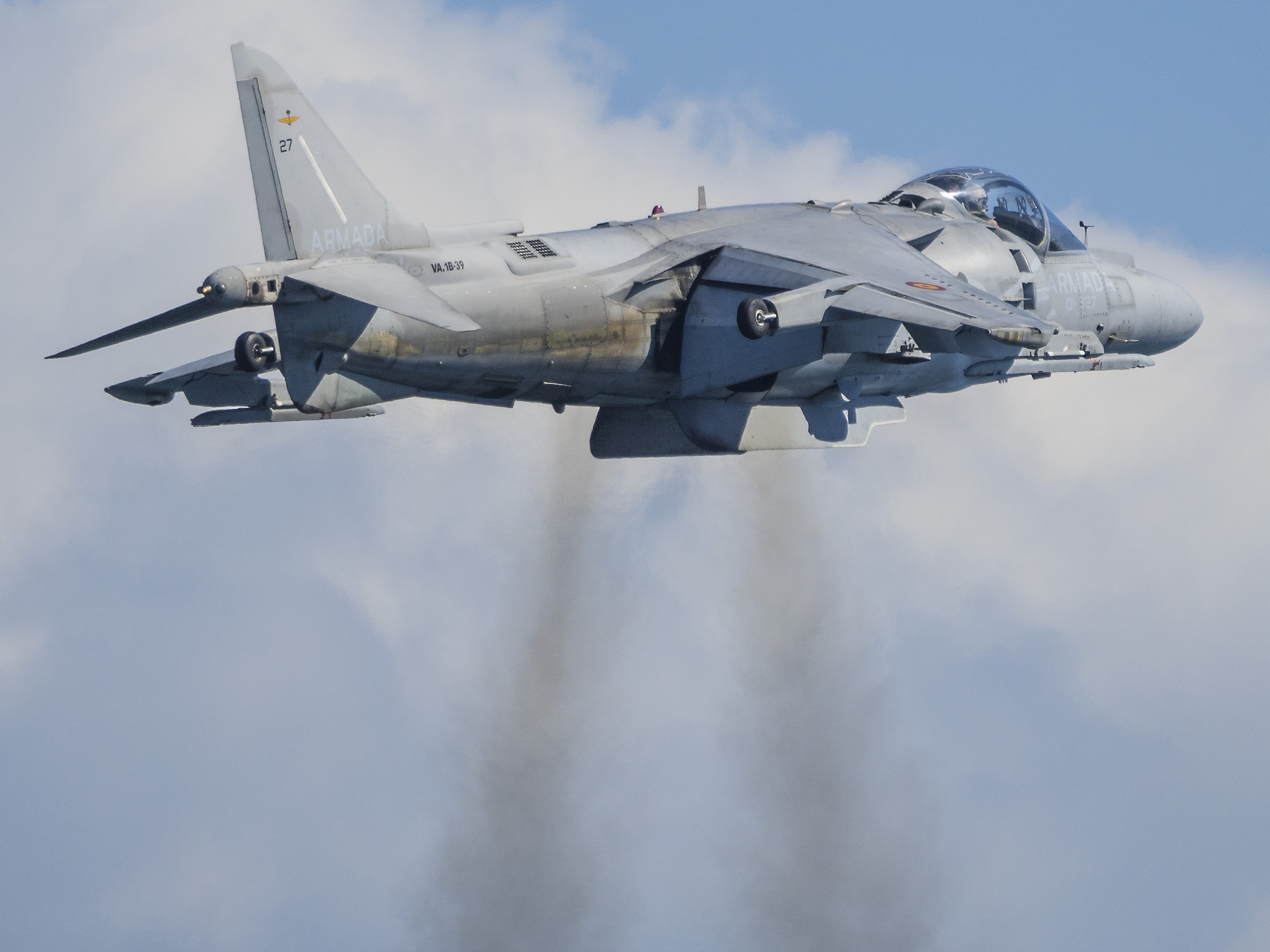
- A Harrier II in hover with downward jet exhaust

General information
- Type: V/STOL strike aircraft
- National origin: United Kingdom
- Manufacturer: Hawker Siddeley; British Aerospace / McDonnell Douglas; Boeing / BAE Systems
- Status: In service
- Primary users: United States Marine Corps (retired) Royal Air Force (retired); Spanish Navy; Italian Navy

History
- Manufactured: 1967–2003
- Introduction date: 1969
- First flight: 28 December 1967
- Developed from: Hawker Siddeley P.1127
- Variants: Hawker Siddeley Harrier; British Aerospace Sea Harrier; McDonnell Douglas AV-8B Harrier II; British Aerospace Harrier II

The Harrier, informally referred to as the Harrier jump jet, is a family of jet-powered attack aircraft capable of vertical/short takeoff and landing operations (V/STOL). Named after the bird of prey, it was originally developed by British manufacturer Hawker Siddeley in the 1960s. The Harrier emerged as the only truly successful V/STOL design of the many attempted during that era. It was conceived to operate from improvised bases, such as car parks or forest clearings, without requiring large and vulnerable air bases. Later, the design was adapted for use from aircraft carriers.

There are two generations and four main variants of the Harrier family, developed by both UK and US manufacturers:

- Hawker Siddeley Harrier (first generation)
  - British Aerospace Sea Harrier
- McDonnell Douglas AV-8B Harrier II (second generation)
  - British Aerospace Harrier II

The Hawker Siddeley Harrier is the first generation-version and is also known as the AV-8A or AV-8C Harrier; it was used by multiple air forces, including the Royal Air Force (RAF) and the United States Marine Corps (USMC). The Sea Harrier is a naval strike/air defence fighter derived from the Hawker Siddeley Harrier; it was operated by both the Royal Navy and the Indian Navy. During the 1980s, a second generation Harrier emerged, manufactured in the United States as the AV-8B and in Britain as the British Aerospace Harrier II respectively. By the start of the 21st century, the majority of the first generation Harriers had been withdrawn, many operators having chosen to procure the second generation as a replacement. In the long term, several operators have announced their intention to supplement or replace their Harrier fleets with the STOVL variant of the F-35 Lightning II, designated as the F-35B.

== Development ==
=== Background ===
Throughout the 1950s, particularly in the years following the Korean War, a number of aircraft companies in both Europe and America separately decided to investigate the prospective capabilities and viability of vertical take-off and landing (VTOL) aircraft, which would eliminate the requirement for vulnerable runways by taking off and landing vertically as opposed to the conventional horizontal approach. In addition to military applications, the prospect of applying such technology to commercial airliners was also viewed with considerable interest by the mid-1950s, thus the value of developing viable vertical take-off systems was judged to be substantial. However, during this era, few companies envisioned that a VTOL aircraft could also be compatible with the characteristics of high performance military aircraft.

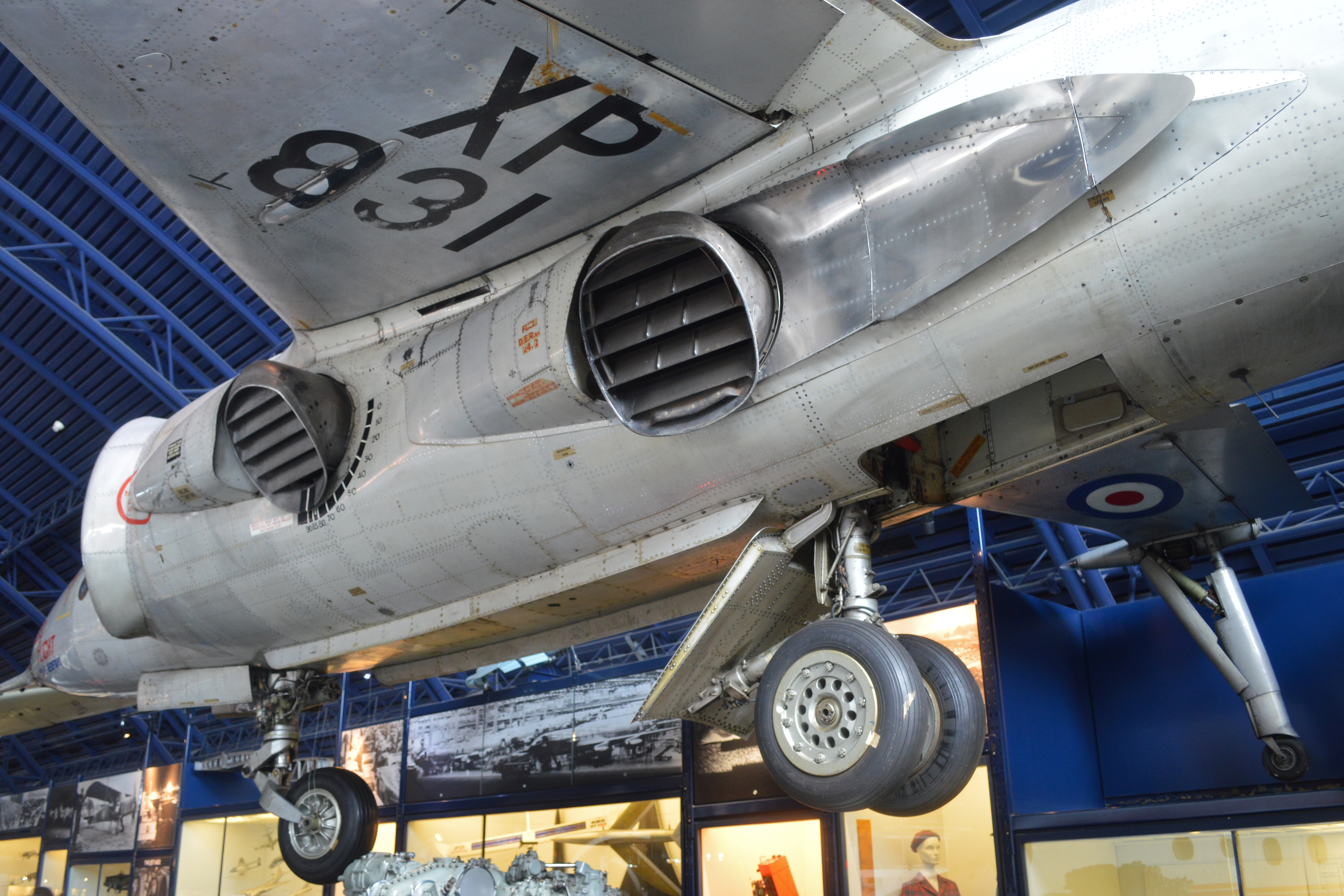
Underside view of the first prototype P.1127. The rotating jet nozzles were a key design element of its VTOL capability

During 1957, following an approach by the British aero engine manufacturer Bristol Engine Company, who were designing an innovative vectored thrust engine, British aviation conglomerate Hawker Aircraft developed their design for an aeroplane that could meet an existing NATO specification calling for a "Light Tactical Support Fighter". Bristol's projected vectored thrust engine, which received the name Pegasus, (Note: The name "Pegasus" for the engine was in keeping with Bristol's tradition of naming engines after figures from classical mythology.) harnessed rotatable "cold" jets which were positioned on either side of the compressor along with a "hot" jet which was directed via a conventional central tailpipe; this concept had originated from Michel Wibault, a French aviation consultant. Throughout much of the early development work, there was no financial support for the project from HM Treasury; however, support for the engine development portion of the effort was sourced via NATO's Mutual Weapon Development Program (MWDP).

Senior project engineer Ralph Hooper at Hawker promptly set about establishing an initial layout for a theoretical aircraft to take advantage of the Pegasus engine, using data provided by Bristol. During March 1959, the newly merged Hawker Siddeley decided to privately fund a pair of prototypes of the design, which had received the internal company designation of P.1127, to demonstrate the design's capabilities. During the 1960s, the P.1127 attracted the attention of the RAF; this would eventually result in the development and issuing of Requirement ASR 384, which sought a V/STOL aircraft for ground attack operations. During late 1965, the RAF placed an order for six pre-production P.1127 (RAF) aircraft.

=== Requirements and emergence ===
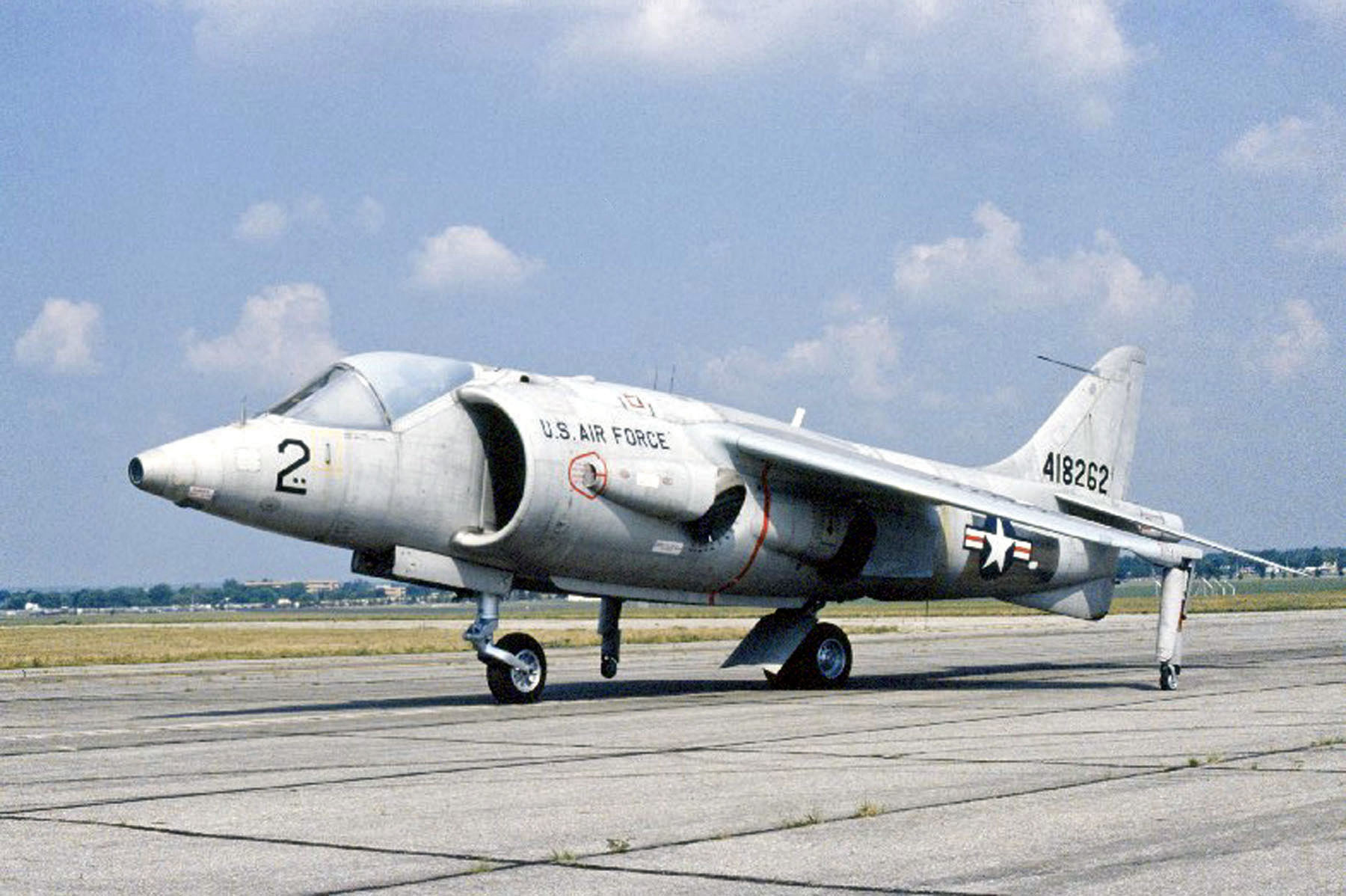
Hawker Siddeley XV-6A Kestrel in later USAF markings

Around the same time as the RAF's interest in the concept, NATO proceeded to develop their own specification, NBMR-3, which called for a vertical takeoff and landing (VTOL) aircraft; specific requirements included the expectation for the performance of such an aircraft to be equivalent to the conventional McDonnell Douglas F-4 Phantom II fighter. Specifications called for a supersonic V/STOL strike fighter with a combat radius of 460 kilometres (250 nmi), a cruise speed of Mach 0.92, and a dash speed of Mach 1.5. During the early 1960s, Hawker commenced work upon developing a supersonic version of the P.1127, designated the P.1150, culminating in the abortive Hawker P.1154. NBMR.3 also attracted ten other contenders, among which was P.1154's principal competitor, the Dassault Mirage IIIV. The P.1154 was ultimately selected to meet NBMR-3; however, this did not lead to orders being placed.

On 6 December 1961, prior to the design being submitted to NATO, it was decided that the P.1154 would be developed with the requirements for use by both the Royal Air Force (RAF) and Royal Navy (RN). Following the cancellation of the NBMR-3 requirement, HSA focused all its attention on the British joint requirement. Accordingly, development of the type continued for some time; however, by October 1963, the Ministry of Aviation was concerned with the project's progress, and noted that the effort to combine a strike aircraft and a fighter in a single aircraft, and trying to fit that same airframe to both of the services, was "unsound". On 2 February 1965, work on the P.1154 was cancelled by the new British government on grounds of cost at the point of prototype construction.

Irrespective of work on the P.1154 programme, development had continued on the subsonic P.1127 evaluation aircraft. A total of nine aircraft, known as the Hawker Siddeley Kestrel, was ordered and manufactured for testing. During 1964, the first of these had commenced flight operations; the Kestrel was assessed by the multinational "Tri-partite Evaluation Squadron", which consisted of British, US and German pilots, to determine how VTOL aircraft could be operated; the evaluations were finalised in November 1965. During 1966, following the cancellation of the P.1154, the RAF opted to proceed with ordering a modified derivative of the P.1127/Kestrel for service, which was designated the Harrier GR.1.

=== First-generation Harriers ===
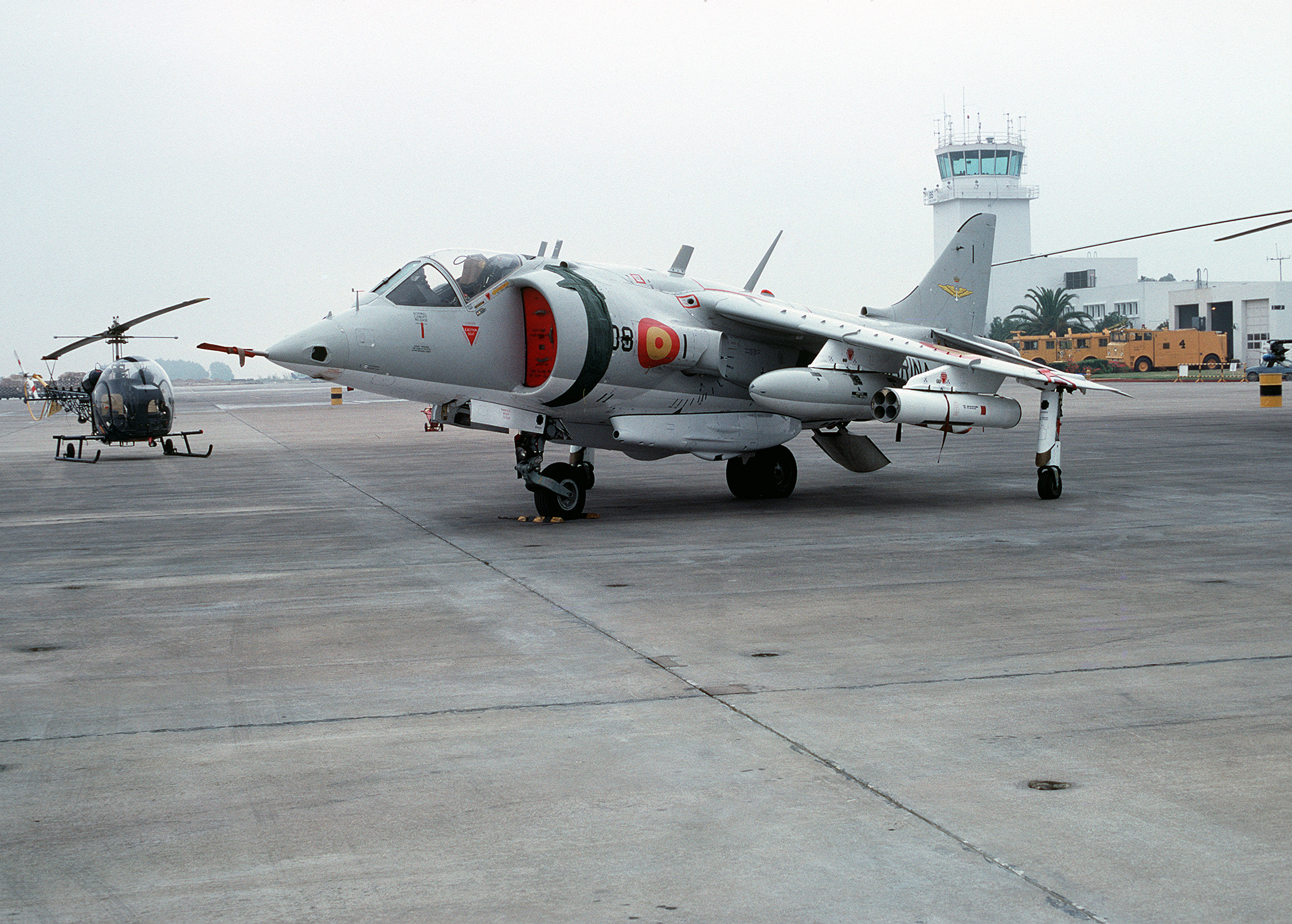
Hawker Siddeley Harrier, in Spanish service

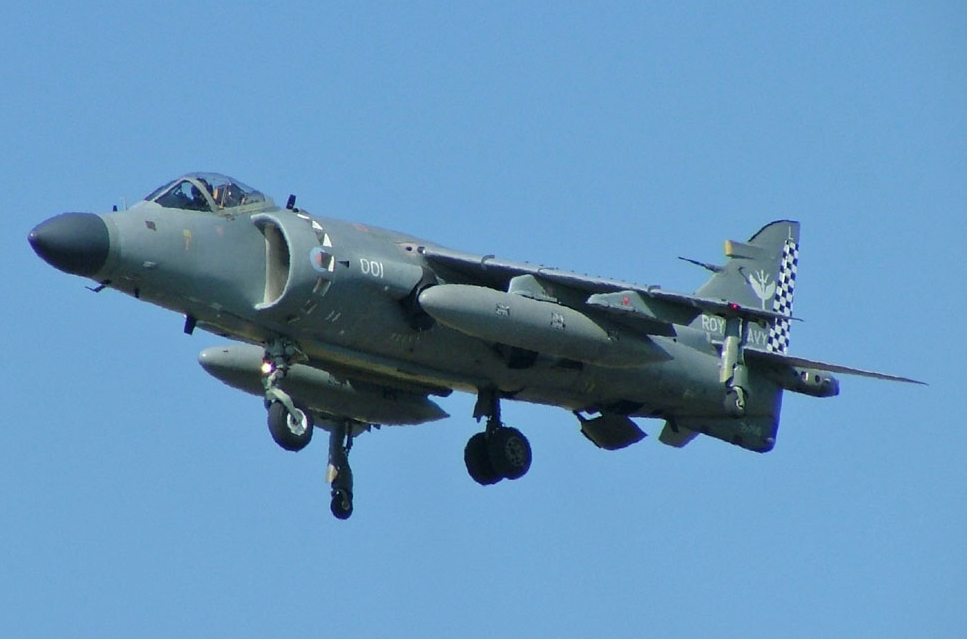
British Aerospace Sea Harrier, in Royal Navy service

The Hawker Siddeley Harrier GR.1/GR.3 and the AV-8A Harrier were the first generation of the Harrier series, the first operational close-support and reconnaissance attack aircraft with vertical/short takeoff and landing (V/STOL) capabilities. These were developed directly from the Hawker P.1127 prototype and the Kestrel evaluation aircraft. On 18 April 1969, the Harrier GR.1 officially entered service with the RAF when the Harrier Conversion Unit at RAF Wittering received its first aircraft. The United States Marine Corps (USMC) also chose to procure the type, receiving 102 AV-8A and 8 TAV-8A Harriers between 1971 and 1976.

The British Aerospace Sea Harrier is a naval V/STOL jet fighter, reconnaissance and attack aircraft; it was a navalised development of the Hawker Siddeley Harrier. The first version entered service with the Royal Navy's Fleet Air Arm in April 1980 as the Sea Harrier FRS.1, and was informally known as the Shar. Sea Harriers played a high-profile role in the Falklands War of 1982, flying from the aircraft carriers HMS Invincible and HMS Hermes. Wartime experiences led to the production of an improved model in the form of the upgraded Sea Harrier FA2; this version entered operational service on 2 April 1993. The Sea Harrier was also procured by the Indian Navy, where the first Indian Sea Harriers entered squadron service during December 1983.

=== Second-generation Harriers ===
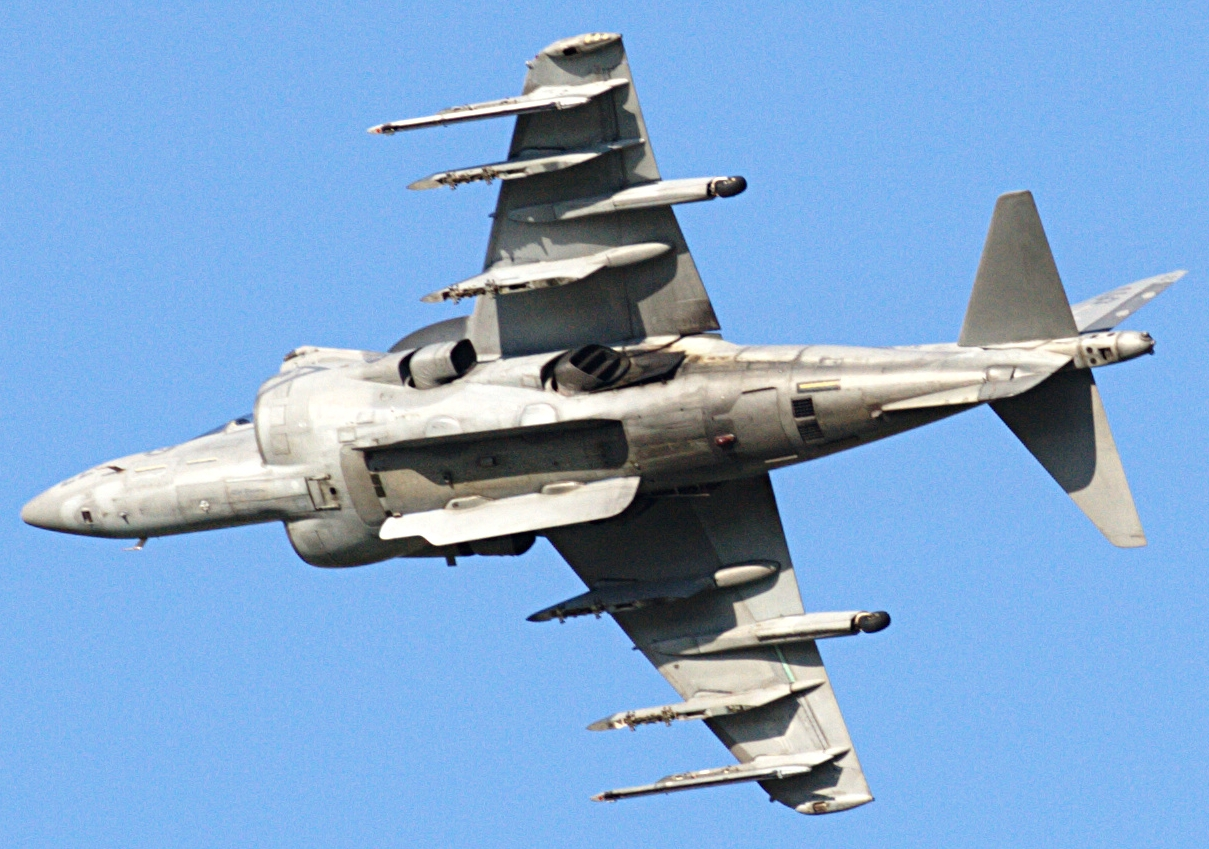
McDonnell Douglas AV-8B Harrier II, in United States Marine Corps service

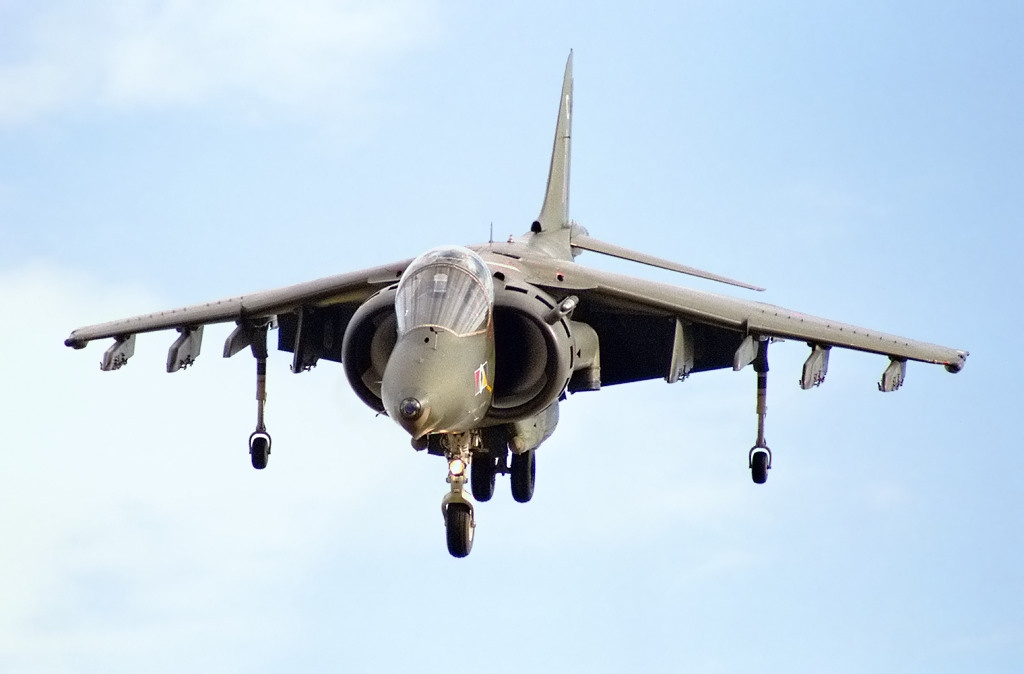
British Aerospace Harrier II, in Royal Air Force service

As early as 1973, Hawker Siddeley and American aviation manufacturer McDonnell Douglas were jointly working on development of a more capable version of the Harrier. Early efforts concentrated on the development of an improved Pegasus engine, designated the Pegasus 15, which was being tested by Bristol Siddeley. During August 1981, the program received a boost when British Aerospace (BAe) and McDonnell Douglas signed a Memorandum of Understanding (MoU), marking the UK's re-entry into the program. The Harrier was extensively redeveloped by McDonnell Douglas, and later joined by British Aerospace (now parts of Boeing and BAE Systems, respectively), leading to the family of second-generation V/STOL jet multi-role aircraft. The American designation for this was the AV-8B Harrier II.

On 12 December 1983, the first production AV-8B was delivered to the USMC. The AV-8B is primarily used for attack or multi-role tasks, typically operated from small aircraft carriers. The RAF also chose to procure the second generation of the British Aerospace-built (with McDonnell Douglas as subcontractor) Harrier II GR5/GR7/GR9, which entered service in the mid-1980s. This model was also operated by several other NATO countries, including Spain and Italy. In December 1989, the first RAF squadron to be equipped with the Harrier II was declared operational. The British Harrier II was used by the RAF and later by the Royal Navy up to 2010, at which point the Harrier II and the Joint Force Harrier operational unit was disbanded as a cost-saving measure.

Between 1969 and 2003, 824 Harriers of all types were delivered. While the manufacture of new Harriers concluded in 1997, the last remanufactured aircraft (Harrier II Plus configuration) was delivered in December 2003, ending the Harrier production line.

== Operation ==
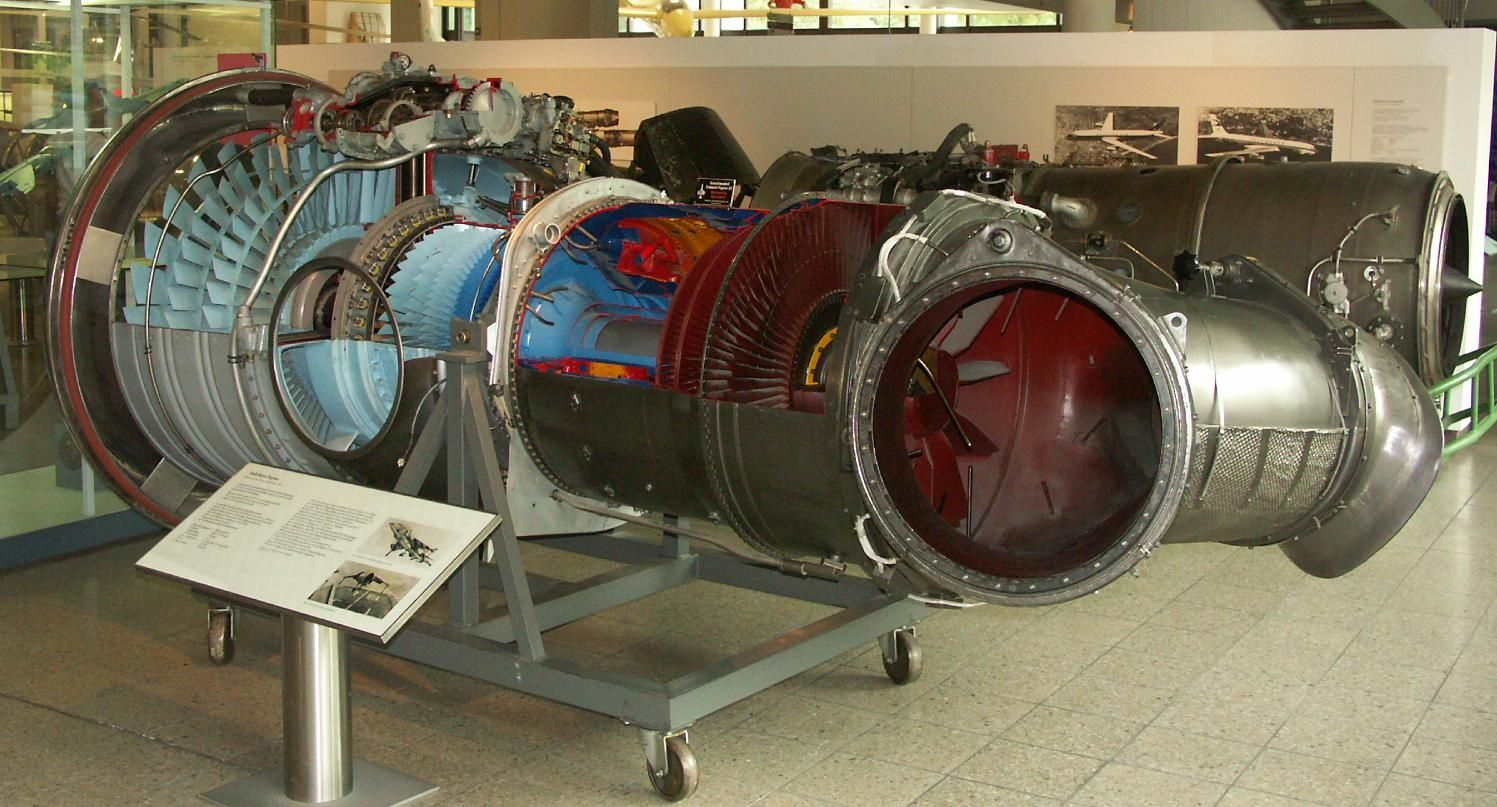
Rolls-Royce Pegasus engine on display; sections have been cut out to provide an internal view

Locations of the four nozzles at the sides of the Pegasus engine

The Harrier jump jet, though capable of taking off vertically, can do so only at less than its maximum loaded weight. In most cases a short take off is needed to lift the required amount of fuel and weapons needed for a training sortie/mission, using forward speed to supplement the jet lift with aerodynamic lift. A short takeoff also uses less fuel than a vertical take off. On some aircraft carriers, a ski-jump ramp is used at the bow of the carrier to help the aircraft become airborne. Landings are not usually done in a conventional manner because the range of speeds at which this is advisable is narrow due to the relatively vulnerable outrigger undercarriage. Operationally, a near-vertical landing with some forward speed is preferred; this technique is called shipborne rolling vertical landing (SRVL). Rotating the vectored thrust nozzles to some angle other than rearwards during normal flight (to a maximum of 8-degree forward of vertical, i.e. 98 deg.) is called vectoring in forward flight, or "VIFFing". This is a dog-fighting tactic, allowing for more sudden braking and higher turn rates. Braking could cause a chasing aircraft to overshoot and present itself as a target for the Harrier, a technique formally developed by the USMC for the Harrier in the early 1970s. This technique was much discussed in the media before the Falklands War in 1982, but ultimately not used by British pilots in that conflict. However, the ability to rotate the nozzles slightly forwards did allow the aircraft to fly slowly backwards in the hover, which was widely used in British and American airshows.

The wind direction is critical during VTOL manoeuvres because unless it enters the intake from straight ahead it will push the nose sideways as it turns to enter the intake (known as intake momentum drag). If not corrected immediately, the aircraft will roll out of control. The pilot has a wind vane in front of the windscreen to help keep pointing into the wind. The procedure for vertical takeoff involves facing the aircraft into the wind. The swivelling nozzles are pointed vertically downwards (thrust vector 90°) and the throttle is pushed to its maximum stop, at which point the aircraft leaves the ground. The throttle is adjusted until hovering is achieved at the desired altitude. The short-takeoff procedure involves proceeding with a normal takeoff and then rotating the nozzles partially downwards (a thrust vector less than 90°) at a speed below the normal takeoff speed; usually this is done at about 65 knots (120 km/h). For a shorter takeoff run the thrust vector is greater for more jet lift. The reaction control system uses thrusters at the aircraft extremities, nose, tail and wingtips. Thrust from the engine can be temporarily syphoned to control the aircraft's pitch, roll and yaw before it is going fast enough for the elevators, rudder and ailerons to become effective.

The Harrier has been described by pilots as "unforgiving" to fly. The aircraft is capable of forward flight (where it behaves like a fixed-wing aircraft above its stall speed) and VTOL (where the conventional lift and control surfaces are ineffective) along with STOL. Accelerating and decelerating transitions between hovering and conventional flight required considerable skill and concentration on the part of the pilot, especially in crosswind conditions. Pilots for the combined UK/US/Germany trials on the Kestrel were first given several hours of helicopter tuition. (Note: In preparation for flying the Kestrel, pilots of the Tripartite Evaluation Squadron were provided with several hours of helicopter piloting tuition, all of whom agreed on the effort being highly worthwhile preparation.) Royal Air Force pilots destined for Harrier squadrons were usually selected from those with single-seat fast-jet experience. On two occasions the Royal Air Force explored whether experienced helicopter pilots, with their ability to hover and transition to forward flight, would be a better source for Harrier squadrons. In both cases the pilots were completely out of their depth with conventional flight, navigation, orientation and weapons delivery at the high speeds of a fast jet. With the introduction of two-seat Harriers, less experienced pilots were introduced. The United States Marine Corps also started with very experienced pilots, who were mostly test pilots. In addition to normal flight controls, the Harrier has a lever for controlling the direction of the four vectoring nozzles. Pilots were impressed that to control the aircraft's vertical flight required only a single lever added in the cockpit. For horizontal flight, the nozzles are directed rearwards by shifting the lever to the forward position; for short or vertical takeoffs and landings, the lever is pulled back to point the nozzles downward.

Harrier Jump Jet instrument panel

=== Replacement ===
During 2010, it was announced that the RAF and RN would retire their remaining Harriers by 2011, and in December 2010 the RAF's Harrier GR9s made their last operational flights. In June 2011, the MoD denied press reports that the aircraft were to be sold to the US Marine Corps for spares to support their AV-8B fleet. However, at the end of November 2011, Defence Minister Peter Luff announced the sale of the final 72 Harriers to the US Marine Corps, with the aircraft to be used as sources of spare parts for the Marine Corps's airworthy fleet.

As of 6 May 2024, the STOVL variant of the F-35 Lightning II, designated the F-35B, has replaced the AV-8B Harrier II in service with the US Marine Corps. The RAF and Royal Navy introduced the F-35B in June 2018 with their first F-35 unit, 617 Squadron.

As of March 2021, Italian Navy AV-8Bs had been replaced by F-35Bs, on the Italian aircraft carrier Cavour.

In 2016, the Indian Navy retired the last of their remaining 11 Sea Harriers, which had been operating from INS Viraat in favour of the conventional Mikoyan MiG-29K.

Starting in 2007, Spain was looking to replace its Harrier IIs – with the likely option being the F-35B. However, in May 2014, the Spanish government announced that it had decided to extend the aircraft's service life to beyond 2025 due to a lack of funds for a replacement aircraft. On 6 August 2025, Spain gave up their plans to acquire the F-35B while their fleet, AV-8B+ Harrier II, is scheduled to retire by around 2030.

== Variants ==
Hawker P.1127
(1960)
Kestrel FGA.1
(1964)
Harrier GR.1/1A/3/3A
(from 1966)
Harrier T.2/2A/4/4A/8/52/60
(from 1970)
AV-8A/C/S Harrier Mk.50/53/55/Matador
TAV-8A/S Harrier Mk.54/Matador
Sea Harrier FRS.1/FRS.51/F(A).2
(from 1978)
AV-8B Harrier II/EAV-8B Matador II/AV-8B Harrier II Night Attack/AV-8B Harrier II Plus
(from 1983)
TAV-8B Harrier II/ETAV-8B Matador II/
Harrier GR.5/5A/7/7A/9/9A
(from 1985)
Harrier T.10/12

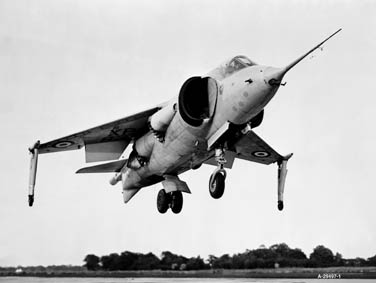
The Hawker P.1127, predecessor to the Harrier

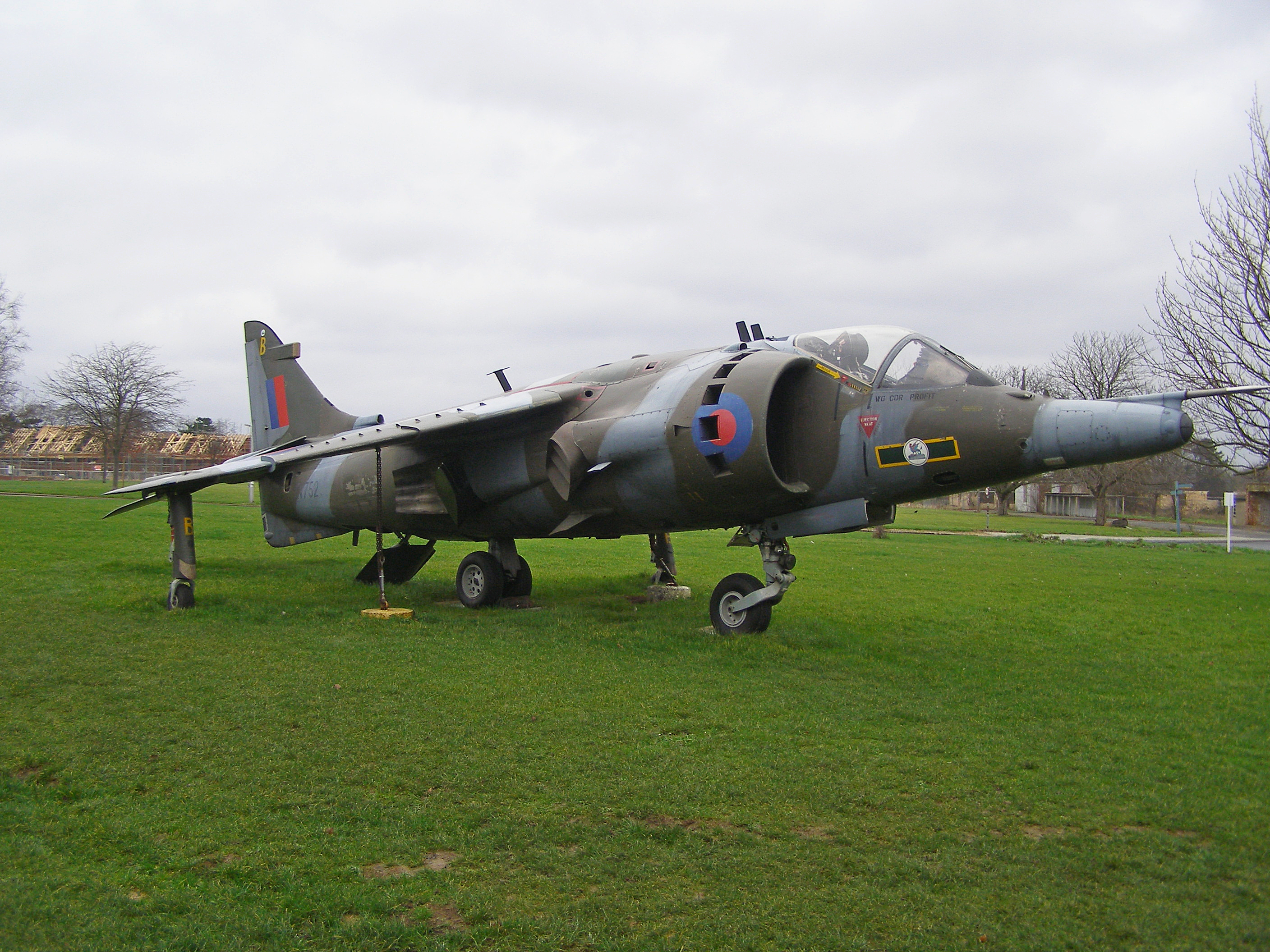
An RAF Harrier GR3 on display at Bletchley Park, England

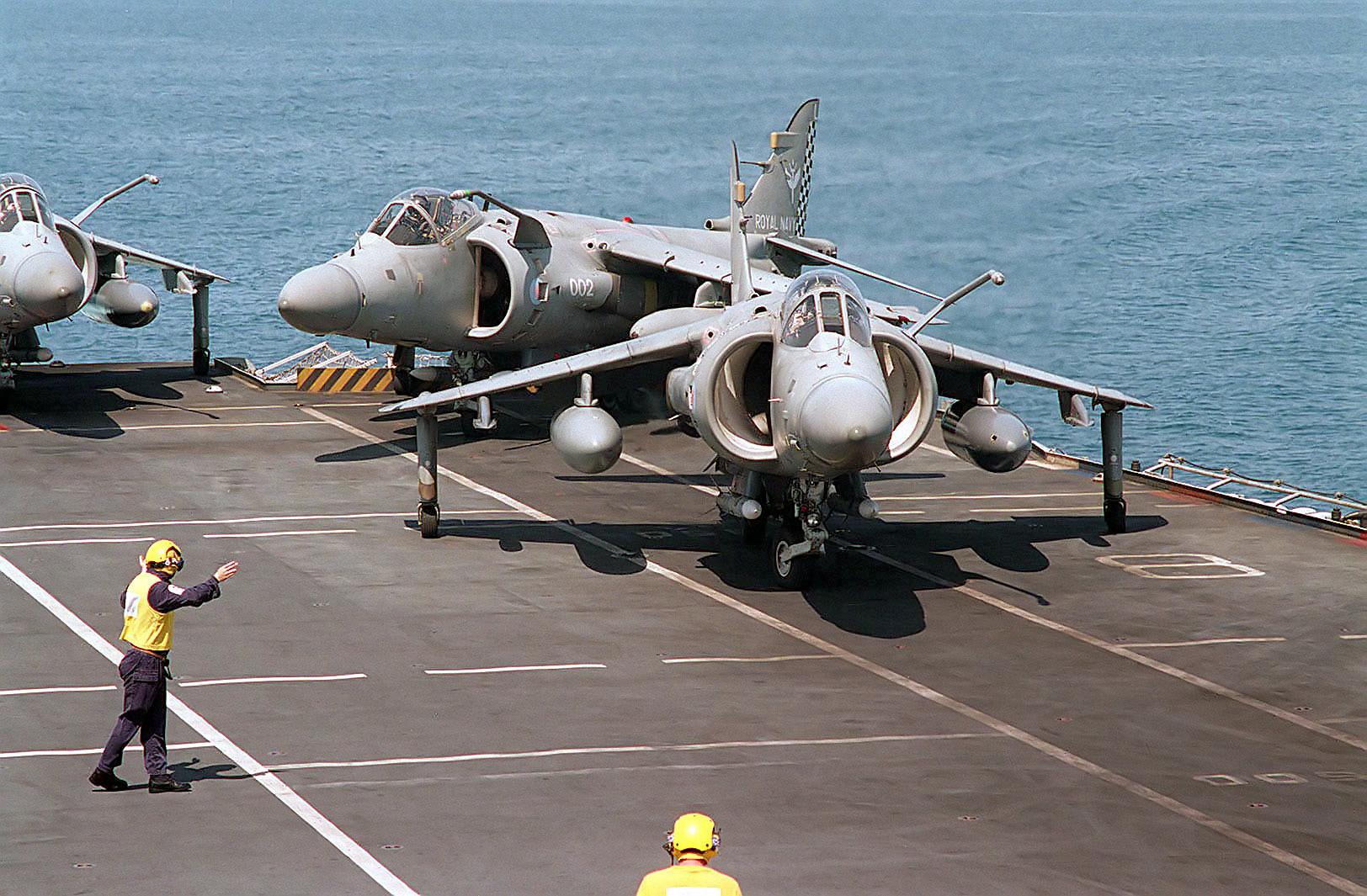
Royal Navy Sea Harrier FA2s of 801 Naval Air Squadron on the deck of HMS Illustrious in the Persian Gulf

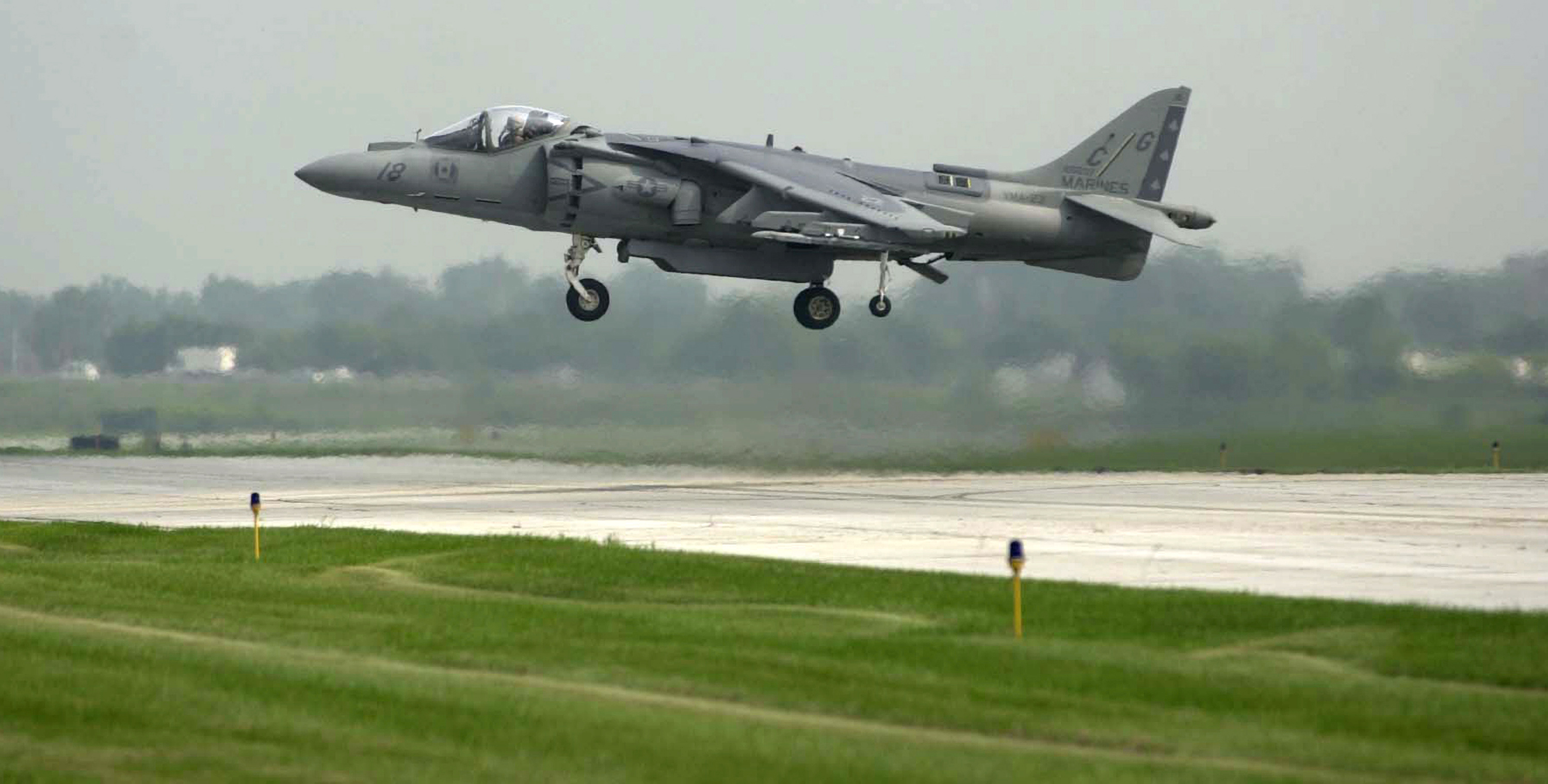
US Marine Corps AV-8B Harrier

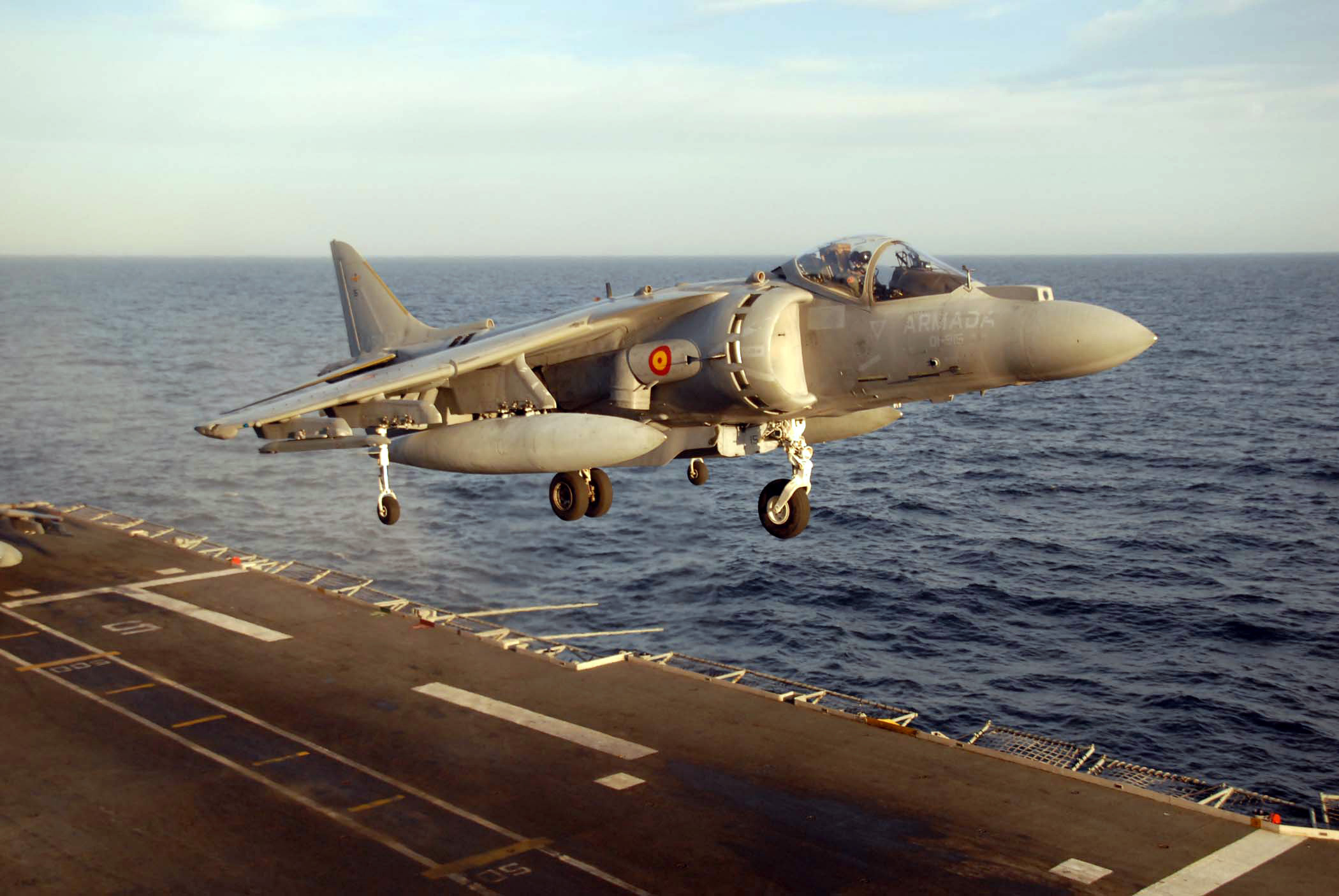
AV-8B Harrier landing aboard Principe de Asturias

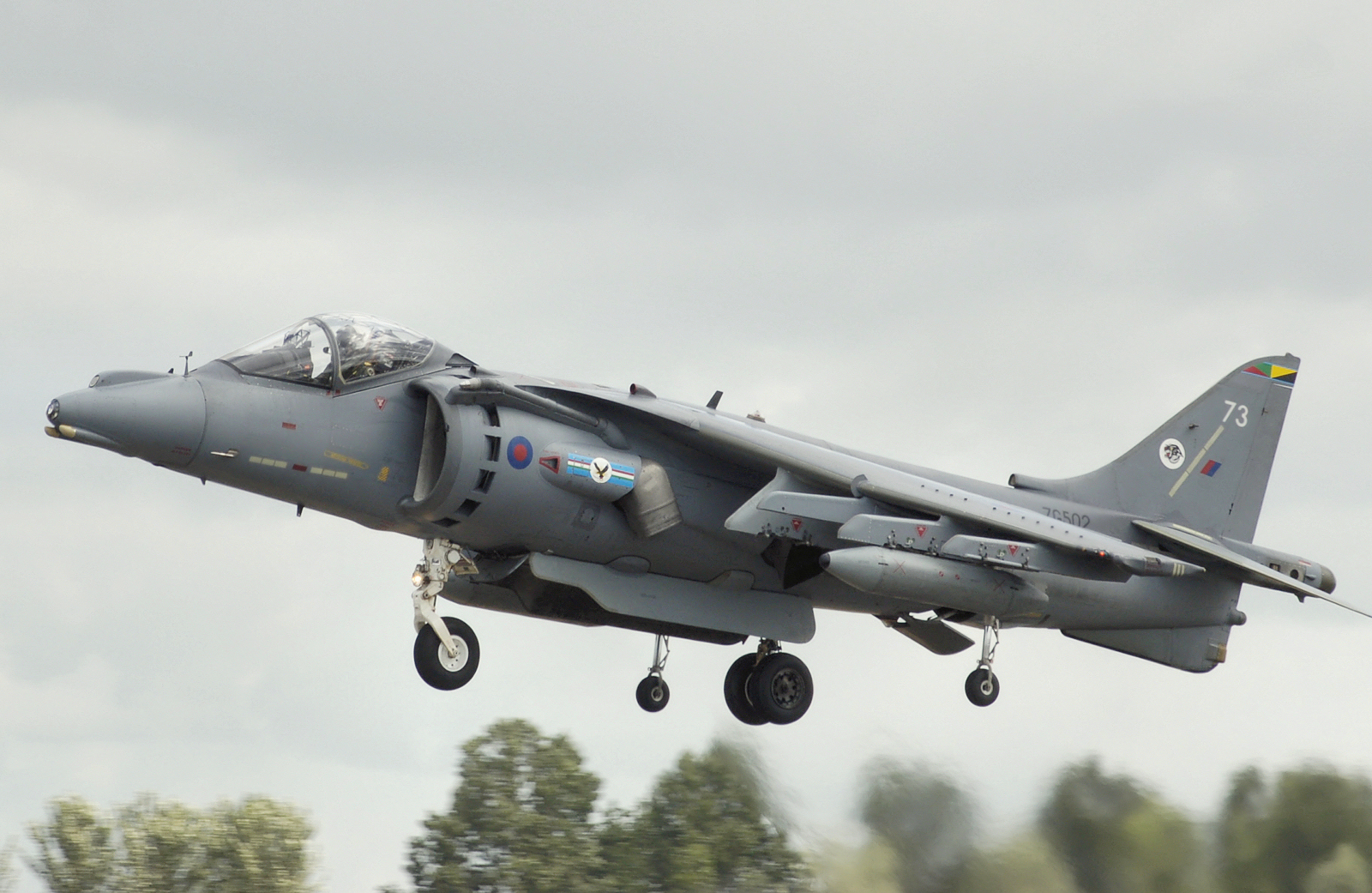
RAF Harrier GR9 arrives at RIAT 2008

== Operators ==
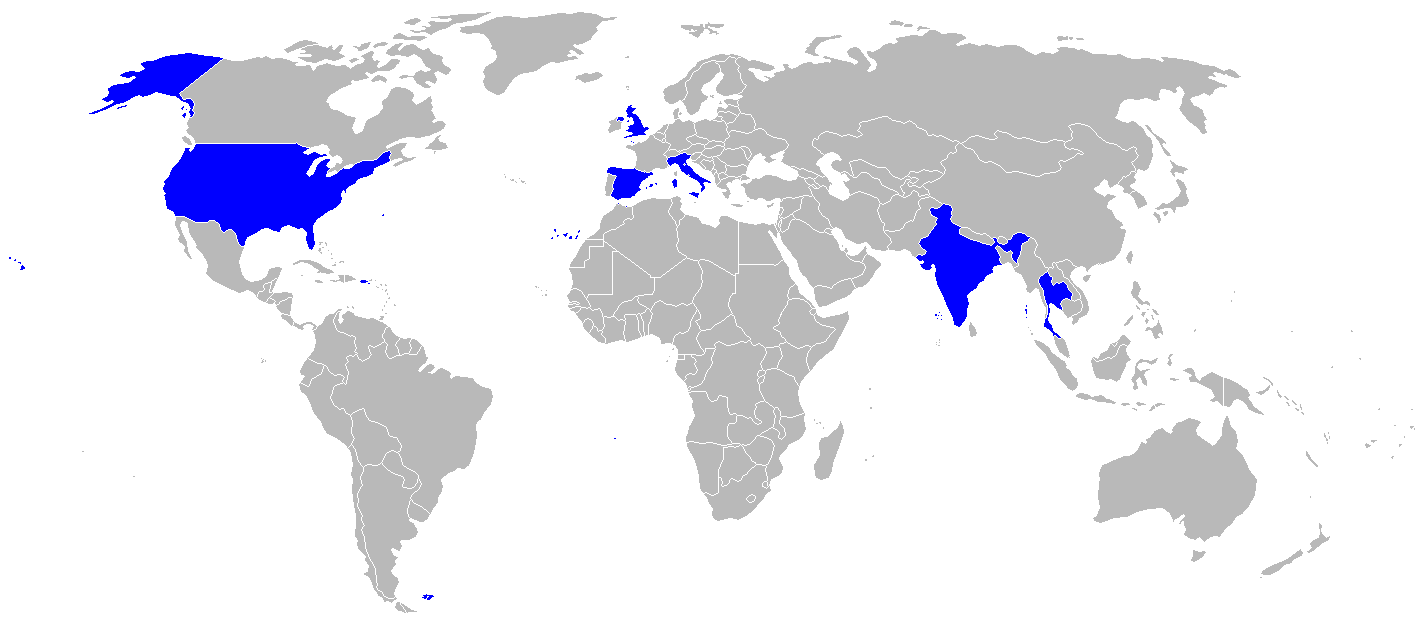
Operators of the Harrier (all variants)

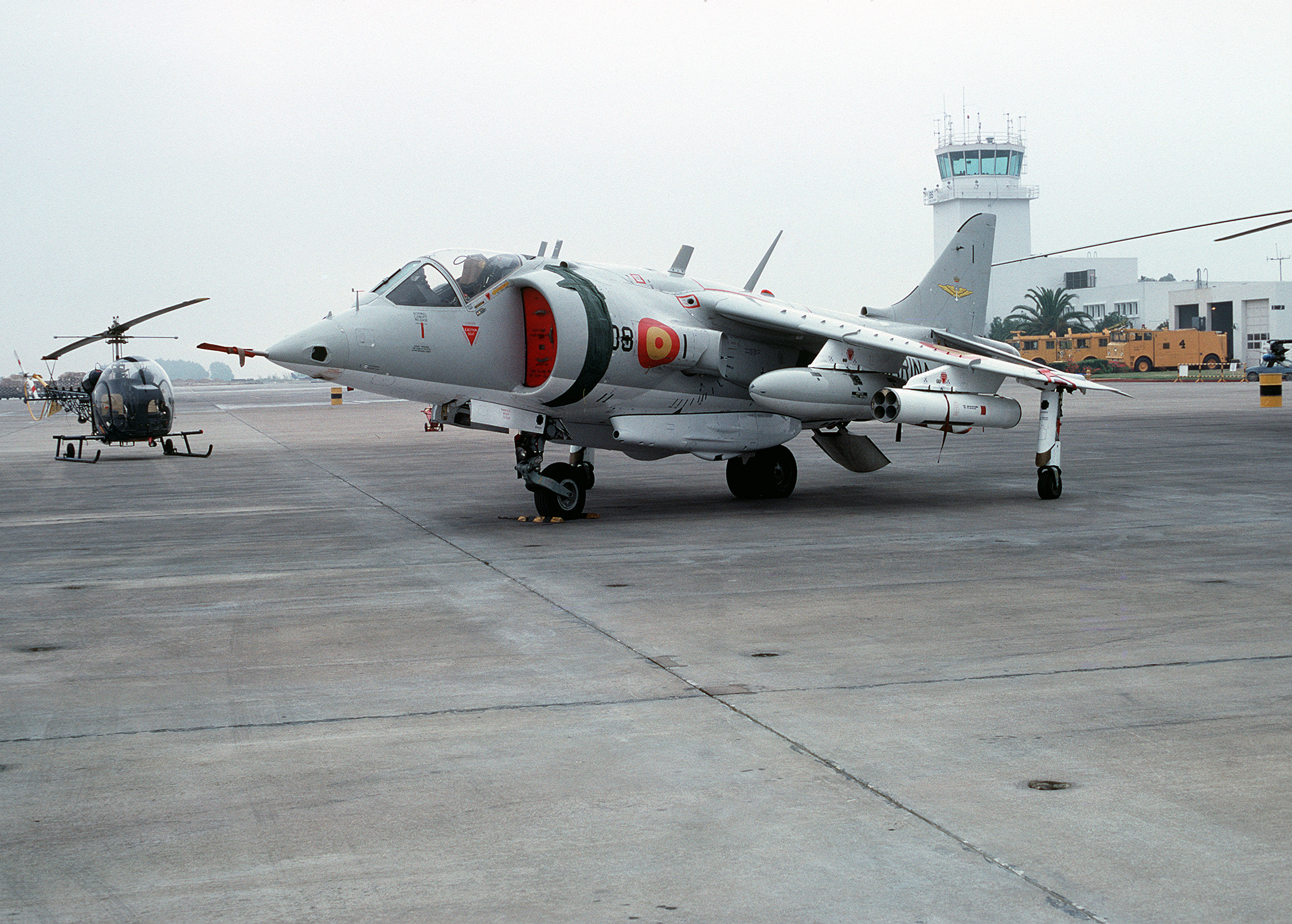
A Spanish Navy AV-8S Matador aircraft

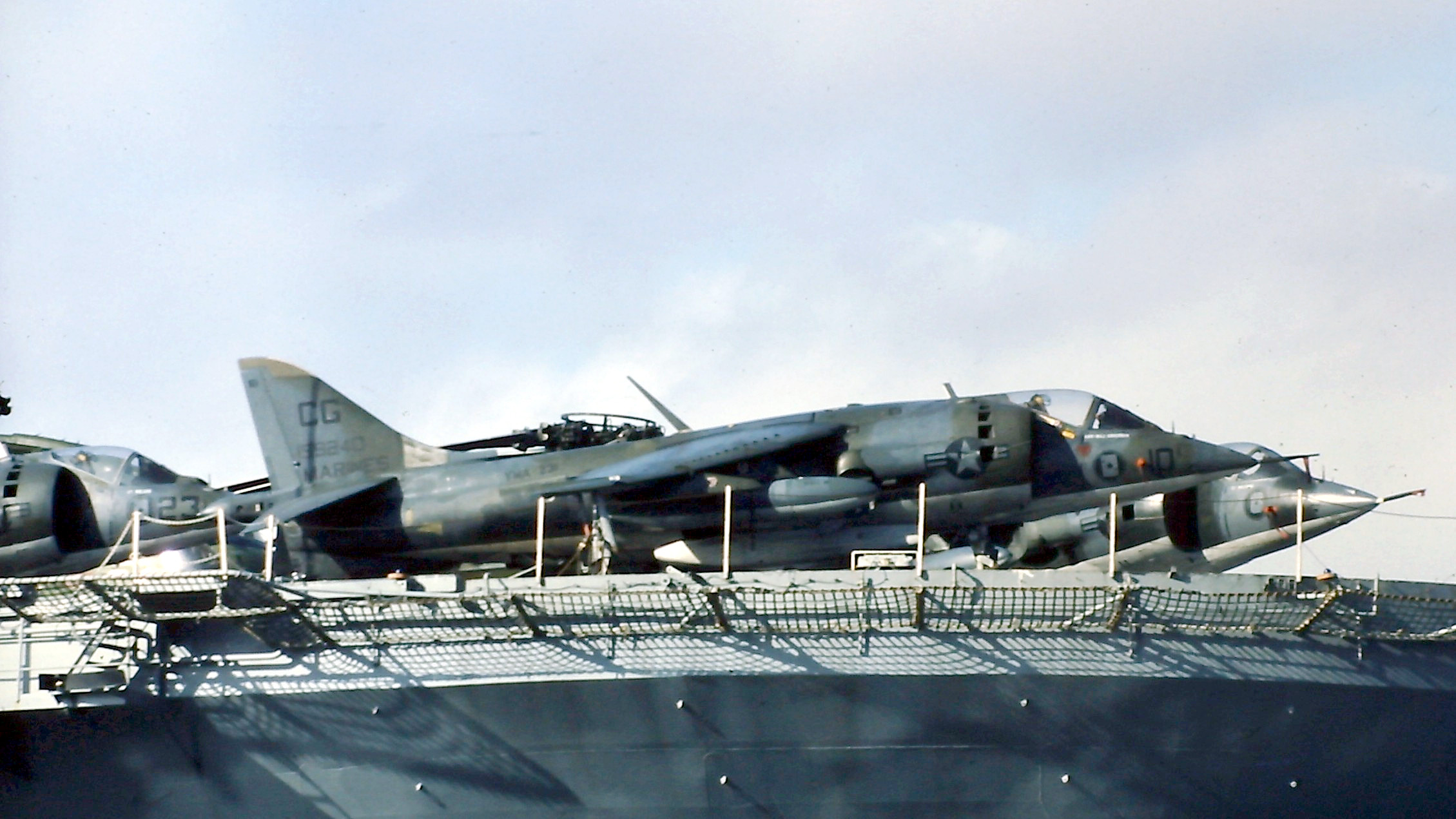
United States Marine Corps AV-8A of VMA-231 in 1980

India

- Indian Navy (former)

Italy

- Italian Navy

Spain

- Spanish Navy

Thailand

- Royal Thai Navy (former)

United Kingdom

- Royal Air Force (former)
- Royal Navy (former)

United States

- United States Marine Corps (former)

== Specifications ==
An unusual feature of the Harrier family of aircraft is their use of two types of flight control to provide pitch, roll and yaw control: conventional control surfaces for wingborne flight, and a system of reaction control valves directing jets of bleed air from the high-pressure compressor of the engine out through the extremities of the nose, tail, and at the wingtips during vectored thrust–borne flight and hover modes. The two systems are fully interlinked but air is not supplied to the reaction control valves during conventional wingborne flight.

	Kestrel FGA.1	Harrier GR3/AV-8A	Sea Harrier FA2	Harrier GR9	AV-8B+ Harrier
Crew	One (Two for trainer versions)				
Length	42 ft 6 in (13.0 m)	47 ft 2 in (14.4 m)	46 ft 6 in (14.2 m)	46 ft 4 in (14.1 m)	47 ft 8 in (14.5 m)
Wingspan	22 ft 11 in (6.98 m)	25 ft 3 in (7.70 m)	25 ft 3 in (7.70 m)	30 ft 4 in (9.25 m)	30 ft 4 in (9.25 m)
Height	10 ft 9 in (3.28 m)	11 ft 4 in (3.45 m)	12 ft 4 in (3.76 m)	11 ft 8 in (3.56 m)	11 ft 8 in (3.56 m)
Empty weight	10,000 lb (4,540 kg)	12,200 lb (5,530 kg)	14,052 lb (6,370 kg)	12,500 lb (5,670 kg)?	13,968 lb (6,340 kg)
Maximum take-off weight (short takeoff)	17,000 lb (7,710 kg)	26,000 lb (11,800 kg)	26,200 lb (11,900 kg)	31,000 lb (14,100 kg)	31,000 lb (14,100 kg)
Max speed	545 mph (877.1 km/h)	731 mph (1,176 km/h)	735 mph (1,183 km/h)	662 mph (1,065 km/h)	662 mph (1,065 km/h)
Combat radius		200 nmi (370 km)		300 nmi (556 km)	300 nmi (556 km)
Engine	Pegasus 6	Pegasus 11 Mk 101	Pegasus 11 Mk 106	Pegasus 11 Mk 107	Pegasus 11 Mk 105
Thrust	15,000 lbf (66.7 kN)	21,800 lbf (97.0 kN)	21,800 lbf (97.0 kN)	24,750 lbf (110 kN)	23,500 lbf (105 kN)
Radar	None	None	Blue Fox / Blue Vixen	None	AN/APG-65

Sources: Nordeen

== See also ==
- Aircraft in fiction - Harrier family
- Leonard v. Pepsico, Inc.
- Lockheed Martin F-35 Lightning II

Related development

- Hawker P.1127/Hawker Siddeley Kestrel
- Hawker Siddeley P.1154
- Hawker Siddeley Harrier
- McDonnell Douglas AV-8B Harrier II
- British Aerospace Harrier II

Aircraft of comparable role, configuration, and era

- Bell X-14
- Hunting H.126
- Rockwell XFV-12
- Ryan XV-5 Vertifan
- Short SC.1
- Yakovlev Yak-36
- Yakovlev Yak-38

Related lists

- List of VTOL aircraft
- List of aircraft of the Fleet Air Arm
- List of attack aircraft
- List of fighter aircraft
- List of aircraft of the Royal Air Force
- List of Harrier family losses
- List of active United States military aircraft
- List of active United Kingdom military aircraft
