= PS5 (disambiguation) =

The PlayStation 5 is a video game console by Sony Interactive Entertainment.

PS5 and variations thereof may also refer to:

- Constituency PS-5 (Ghotki-I), a constituency of the Provincial Assembly of Sindh
- Minardi PS05, a Formula One race car used by Minardi Cosworth in the 2005 Formula One season
- PS-05/A, a pulse-doppler radar currently used by the JAS 39 Gripen fighter aircraft
- PS5 (song), a song by Salem Ilese and other artists
