= Ferranti Blue Fox =

British multi-role airborne radar

Blue Fox
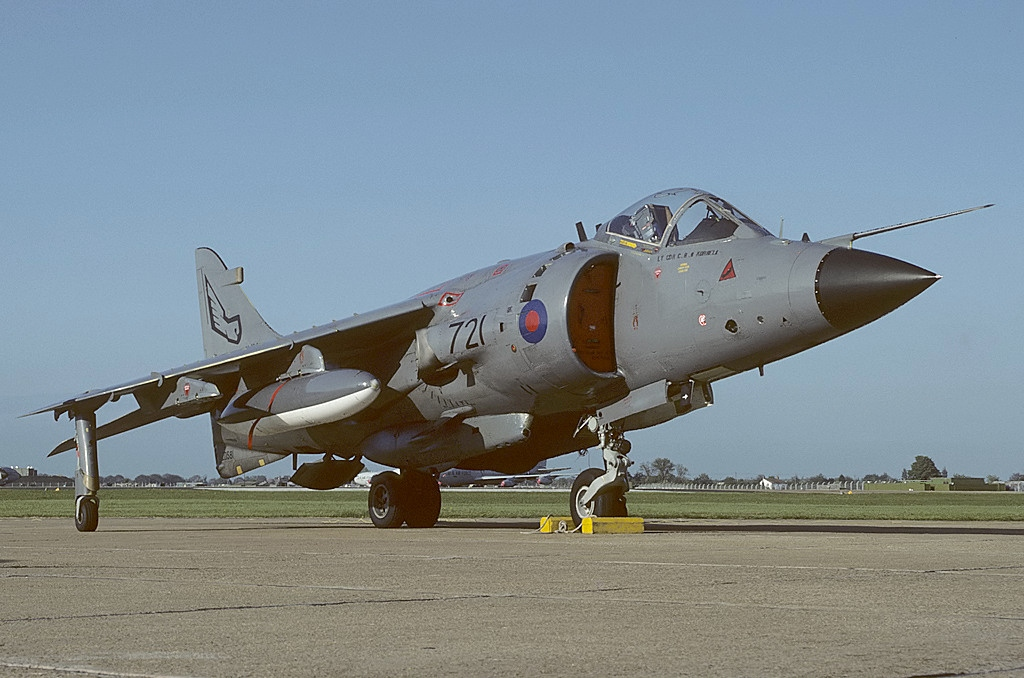
- A British Aerospace Sea Harrier FRS1, showing the black radome for the nose-mounted Blue Fox radar antenna.
- Country of origin: United Kingdom
- Introduced: 1979
- Type: Airborne radar
- Frequency: I-band

The Ferranti Blue Fox was a British multi-role airborne radar designed and built for the Royal Navy by Ferranti Defence Systems in the late 1970s. It had a mixed record in service, and was replaced by the more capable Blue Vixen.

== Design and development ==
Blue Fox was developed to a Royal Navy requirement for a radar to equip the British Aerospace Sea Harrier FRS.1. Its primary role would be to detect large targets like maritime reconnaissance aircraft or anti-shipping bombers flying over the sea. A secondary role was air-to-surface search and strike against shipping. The system was designed within strict limits of size, time and cost.

Ferranti developed the system using components of their Ferranti Seaspray radar, used on the Westland Lynx naval helicopter to detect ships. It emerged as a frequency agile I band radar that weighed less than 85 kilograms in total.

Three two-seat Hawker Hunters were also fitted with Blue Fox radars for Royal Navy Sea Harrier pilot training, designated Hunter T.8M.

== Service history ==
The Blue Fox entered operational service with the Fleet Air Arm in July 1981 when 801 Naval Air Squadron, under the command of Commander Nigel "Sharkey" Ward, was commissioned and went to sea aboard HMS Invincible. Previously, 899 Naval Air Squadron, the Headquarters Training Squadron for the new Sea Harrier and 800 Naval Air Squadron, the first operational unit of the type, had initially flown their aircraft without radar fitted.

Following the Argentinian invasion of the Falkland Islands in April 1982, the British Government dispatched a naval task force to the South Atlantic, including two aircraft carriers, each carrying a Sea Harrier squadron. 801 Squadron was embarked on HMS Invincible and 800 Squadron (now with Blue Fox) on the flagship, HMS Hermes. The leadership of 800 Squadron had experienced difficulties with the Blue Fox radar and took the view that it was useless, discounting Ward's claims that the equipment performed better than Ferranti had predicted. A Ferranti engineer joined the task force at Ascension Islands, primarily to fix a problem with seawater ingress into the radome, but was also able to retune 800 Squadron's radars. However, by that time, confidence in the equipment had been lost and there remained considerable differences in the way it was utilised between the two squadrons throughout the conflict. In the course of the war, four Argentinian aircraft were destroyed in air-to-air combat using Blue Fox. As was expected, the radar was unable to "look down" over land or rough sea and the other interceptions relied on a combination of ships' radars and visual acquisition. However, in moderate sea states, the Blue Fox was found to be useful in the surface search mode, being able to detect a warship at a range of 100 nautical miles (190 km). On 2 May, a single Sea Harrier was able to detect the Argentinian carrier group as it approached the British task force.

The Fleet Air Arm's Sea Harrier FRS1 with Blue Fox began to be phased out in 1989 with the introduction of the FA2 version, which was fitted with the more capable Ferranti Blue Vixen radar. The remaining FRS1 aircraft were converted to this standard as the FRS2.

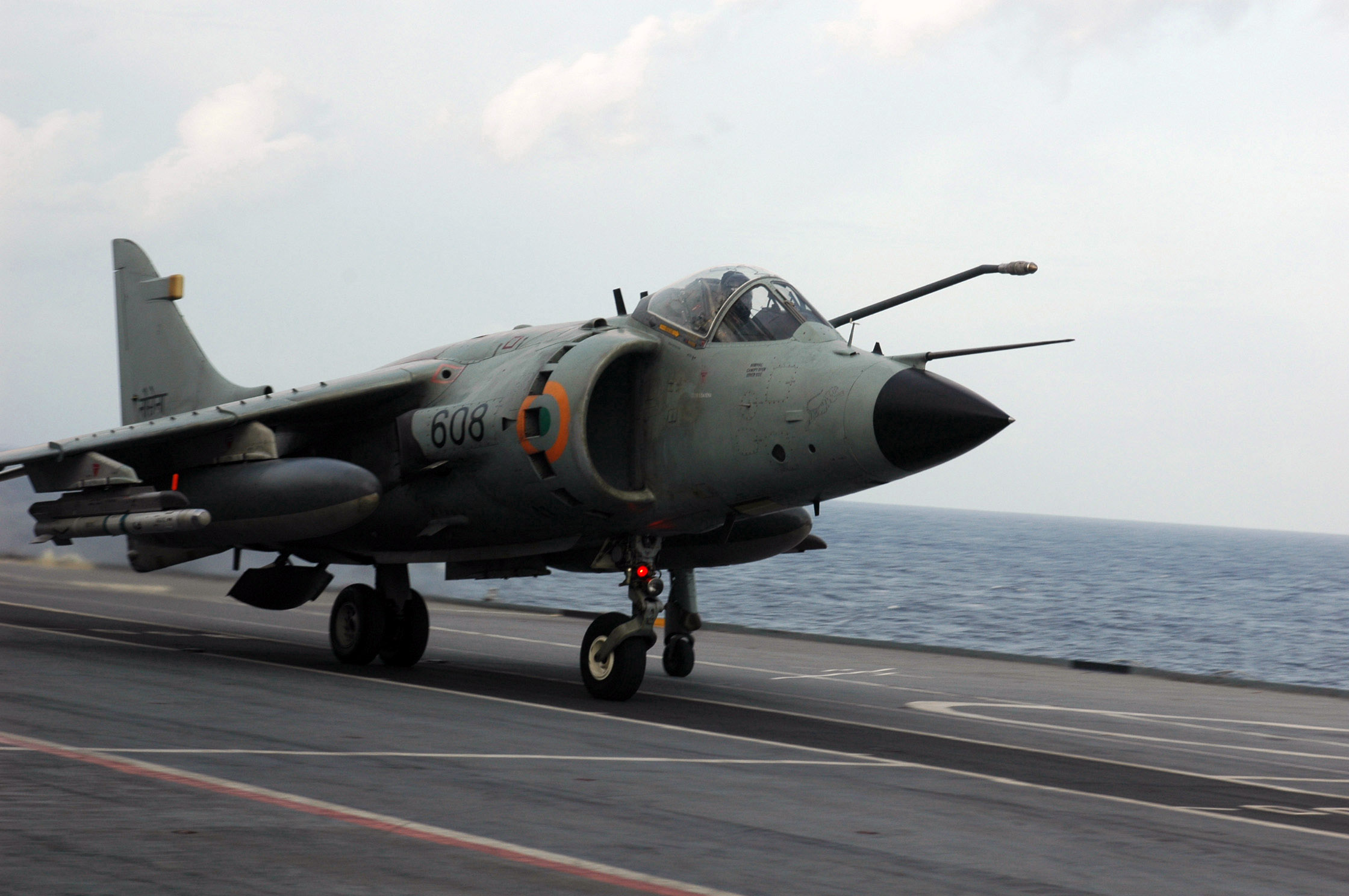
An Indian Naval Air Arm Sea Harrier taking off from the flight deck of Indian Navy aircraft carrier INS Viraat in 2007.

The Indian Navy acquired Sea Harriers in three batches, the first in 1983. For the second batch, to be delivered in 1989, the Indians sought a radar with a better "look down" capability, but the successor to the Blue Fox, the Blue Vixen, was still undergoing trials in the United Kingdom and would not be available for export for some years, so Blue Fox was reluctantly accepted. The Indian Sea Harriers were eventually upgraded by the replacement of Blue Fox with the Israeli Elta EL/M-2032 radar.

== Operators ==
India

- Indian Navy

United Kingdom

- Royal Navy

== See also ==
- Blue Vixen
