= PS-05/A =

Pulse-doppler radar

The PS-05/A is a pulse-doppler radar currently used by the JAS 39 Gripen fighter aircraft (JAS 39A, B, C and D variants). It weighs 156 kg and was developed by Ericsson in collaboration with GEC-Marconi, sharing some technology with the latter's Blue Vixen radar for the Sea Harrier (which inspired the Eurofighter's CAPTOR radar).

The PS-05/A works in the 8–10 GHz band and has 1 kW energy output (> 10 kW maximum output). The radar is capable of detecting, locating, identifying and automatically tracking multiple targets in the upper and lower spheres, on the ground and sea or in the air, in all weather conditions. It consists of four line replaceable units and all LRUs can be replaced in 30 minutes.

Gripen operator Hungarian Air Force reported the PS-05 radar set has proved reliable so far, both in domestic service and NATO flight exercises in Corsica.

== Versions ==
=== PS-05/A Mark 3 ===
This version of the PS-05/A radar has been available since 2005. It is capable of detecting a fighter aircraft from 120 km distance and can see road traffic and count ships at anchor in a harbour at 70 km. The radar weighs 156 kg made up of a 25 kg 60 cm diameter antenna/platform assembly, a 73 kg power liquid-cooled, travelling wave tube power amplifier/transmitter unit, a 32 kg software-controlled exciter/receiver unit and a 23 kg signal/data processor.

Radar modes:

a) Air-to-Air modes:

- LRS (Long Range Search) is used to detect and identify targets at high ranges.
- TWS (Track While Scan) allows to track targets and search for other targets.
- MPTT (Multiple Priority Target Tracking).
- PTT (Priority Target Tracking) allows accurate targeting and tracking Air-to-Air missiles.
- STT (Single Target Track).
- ACM (Air Combat Mode) is used for automatic target detection in dogfight.

b) Air-to-Surface modes:

- LRS (Long Range Search) is used for ground or sea target search at long distances.
- RA (Raid Assessment) ensures bombing.
- SMTI (Stationary and Moving Target Indication) is used for ground stationary or moving targets.
- GSPTT (Ground and Sea Priority Target Tracking).
- GM (Ground Mapping) ensures mapping of terrain under the aircraft for navigation purposes (e.g. terrain copying at night or adverse weather condition).
- HRM (High Resolution Mapping) ensures terrain mapping by synthetic aperture in order to gain high resolution pictures.
- RANGING high accuracy ground target ranging.

All information is processed by a Mercury Computer Systems RACE/PPC setup, which has replaced the Ericsson D80 of Batch 1-2 Gripens.

By 2015 MK3 detection range for Air-to-Air high altitude had improved by 80% compared to earlier, distances where MK3 previously detected a 4 m^{2} sized target it now detects an 0.4 m^{2} target.

During exercises in November 2015 between the Gripen fighters of the Royal Thai Air Force and the Chinese Shenyang J-11As, the latter were detected at more than 160 km.

=== PS-05/A Mark 4 ===
Is an upgraded version of the Mark 3 available since 2015. It extends Air-to-Air operating range by introducing a new Air-to-Air mode which increases acquisition range by 100% at low altitudes and 40% at high altitudes. This radar mode is also useful for detection of targets with very low RCS, and the acquisition range in the legacy Air-to-Air modes is also improved by 20–50%. This version also enhances Air-to-Surface capabilities to modern standards with two new SAR modes with 3-metre and sub-metre resolution, enhances GMTI/GMTT (SMTI/GSPTT) modes and adds a new Sea Search mode designed to detect small boats at an increased acquisition range by >100%. The ECCM capabilities and passive operation are significantly improved, and improves tactical and technical evaluation of analysing radar behaviour.

=== PS-05/A Mark 5 ===
Was intended to be a further upgrade of the Mark 4 radar with a new AESA antenna instead of the mechanically scanned antenna.

Development of the Mark 5 radar started out under the Saab Ericsson NORA (Not Only a RAdar) programme, and has been underway for several years, including test flying aboard a specially retained Saab JA 37 Viggen testbed. The benefits of the NORA concept were the provision of improved long-range tracking as a result of the combination of longer detection range and electronically steered beam control, dominant battlespace awareness, track identification through non-co-operative target recognition, low probability of intercept and enhanced jamming capabilities. The AESA radar programme was directly linked to MIDAS (Multifunction Integrated Defensive Avionics System), which will also add electronic attack and advanced datalinking capabilities.

In October 2015 Saab revealed a new unnamed AESA radar intended for fighter aircraft, utilising the back end of the PS-05/A.

28 April 2020 SAAB reported that it had test flown an GaN based AESA of the PS-05/A radar family.
