= Blue Vixen =

British airborne radar

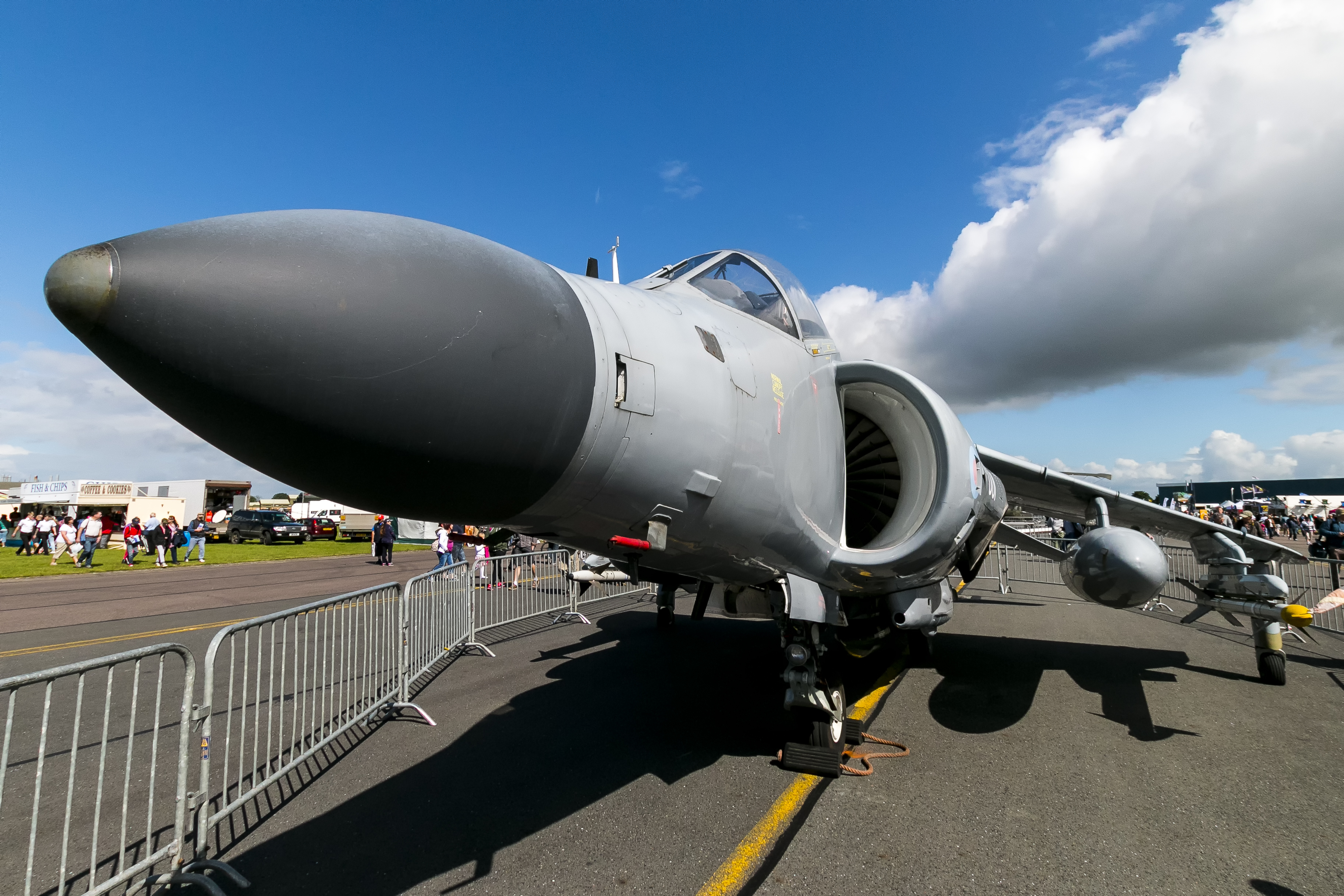
- Blue Vixen radome on the nose of a Royal Navy Sea Harrier FA2
- Country of origin: United Kingdom
- Introduced: 1990s
- Type: Airborne radar
- Frequency: I-band
- PRF: low, medium and high

Blue Vixen was a British airborne radar designed and built for the Royal Navy by Ferranti Defence Systems (later, GEC-Marconi), Edinburgh, Scotland. It was the primary radar of later models of the British Aerospace Sea Harrier, replacing the Ferranti Blue Fox used on earlier models of the Harrier.

== Design and development ==
Blue Vixen was a lightweight (145 kg) multimode, coherent, pulse-Doppler I band airborne radar, developed from the previous Ferranti Blue Fox radar, and designed for use on the British Aerospace Sea Harrier FA2. It was a multimode radar for airborne interception and air-to-surface strike roles over water and land, with look-down/shoot-down and look-up modes. Designed from the start to have full AIM-120 AMRAAM compatibility, it was also compatible with Sea Eagle and AIM-9 Sidewinder missiles.

== Development aircraft used ==
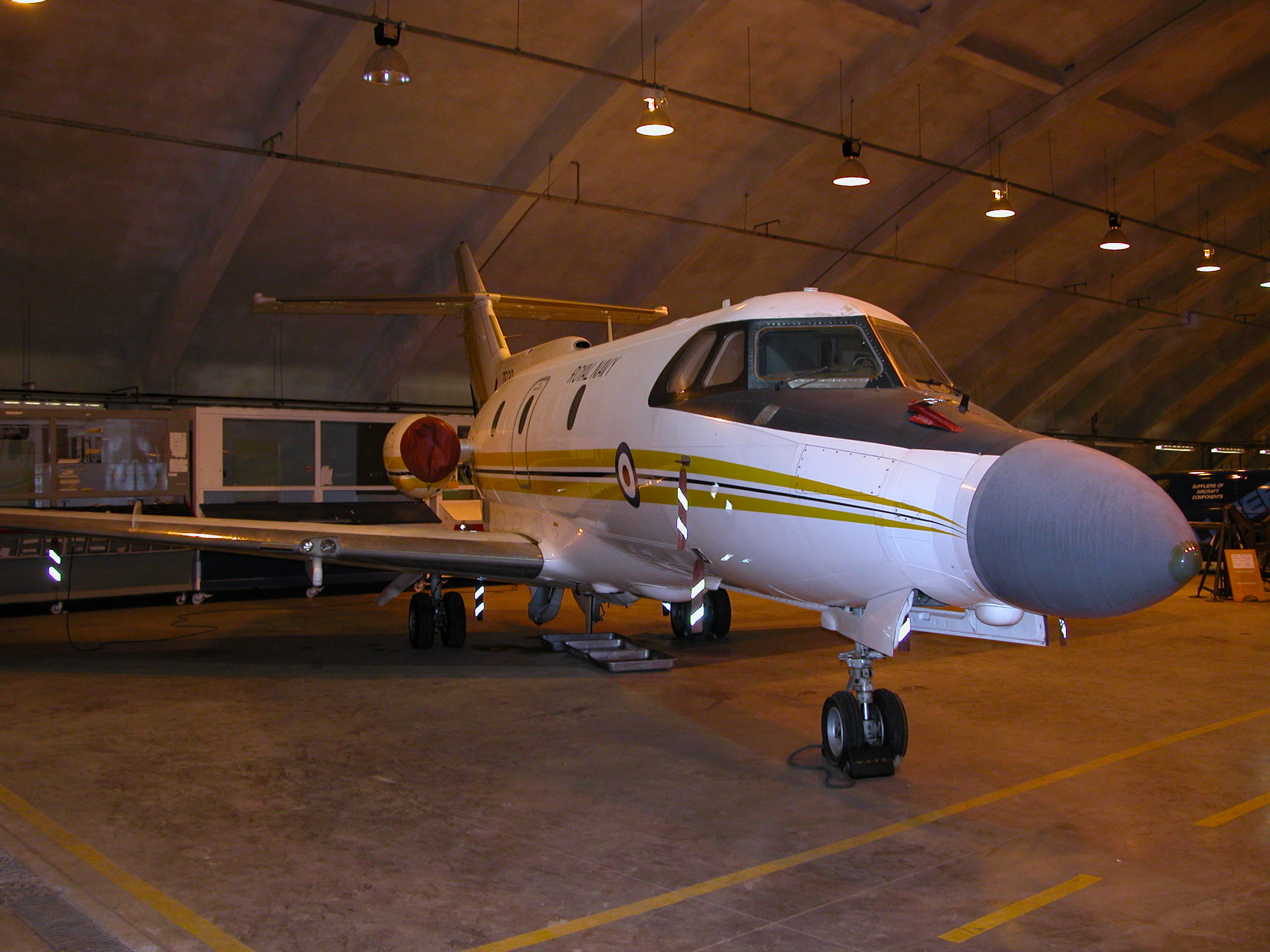
Blue Vixen trials aircraft ZF130 owned by Allaero at MOD St Athan 2002

Two British Aerospace 125 aircraft were used for the flight trial's program. The first (XW930 serial number 25009) was a Series 1 aircraft which had previously been used by the CAFU (Civil Aviation Flying Unit) before it was absorbed into the Royal Aircraft Establishment. It was equipped with a modified nose and carried out the initial development work. This was joined by the dedicated trials aircraft (a series 600 serial number 256059 registered ZF130), fitted with a replica of the Sea Harrier cockpit at the co-pilot's station as well as a Sidewinder acquisition round on a pylon beneath the starboard wing.

== Aircraft fitted to ==
British Aerospace Sea Harrier F(A).2

== Operators ==
United Kingdom

- Royal Navy

== See also ==
- Euroradar CAPTOR
- PS-05/A
- List of Rainbow Codes
