= Hugh Mackenzie (Royal Navy officer) =

Scottish Royal Navy officer (1913–1996)

Vice-Admiral Sir Hugh Mackenzie KCB DSO & Bar DSC
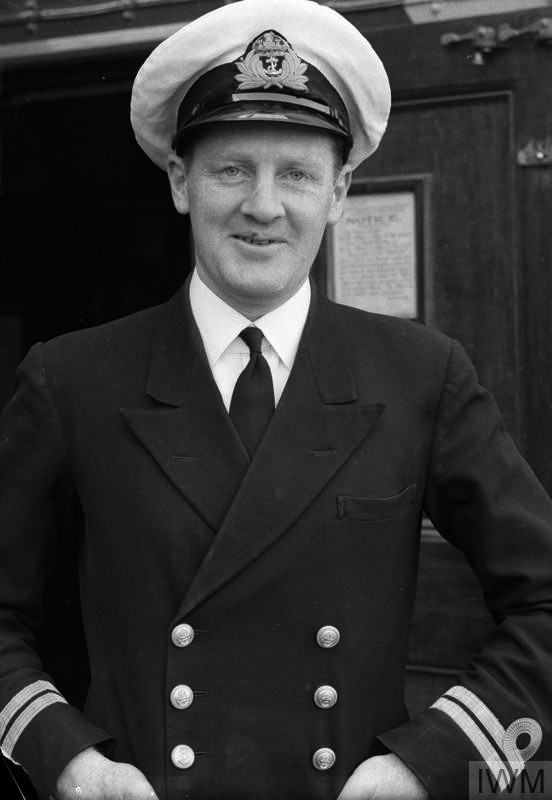
- Lieutenant Hugh Mackenzie, Commander of HM Submarine Thrasher in 1942. Taken on board the submarine depot ship HMS Medway.
- Born: 3 July 1913; Inverness, Scotland
- Died: 8 October 1996 (aged 83) Puttenham, Surrey, England
- Allegiance: United Kingdom
- Branch: Royal Navy
- Service years: 1930–1968
- Rank: Vice-Admiral
- Commands: HMS H28; HMS H43; HMS Thrasher; HMS Tantalus
- Conflicts: Second World War
- Awards: Knight Commander of the Order of the Bath; Distinguished Service Order & Bar; Distinguished Service Cross

Vice-Admiral Sir Hugh Stirling Mackenzie, KCB, DSO & Bar, DSC (3 July 1913 – 8 October 1996) was a Royal Navy officer who became Flag Officer Submarines and Chief Polaris Executive.

Educated at the Royal Naval College, Dartmouth, Mackenzie served in submarines during the Second World War becoming commanding officer of the submarine HMS H28 in March 1941, of HMS H43 in April 1941, of HMS Thrasher in which he sank 40,000 gross register tons (110,000 m^{3}) of enemy shipping, and of HMS Tantalus, in which he conducted a single patrol of nearly 12,000 miles (19,000 km).

Mackenzie went on to be commanding officer of the Underwater Detection Establishment at Portland in 1952, commander of the 1st Destroyer Squadron in June 1954 and Chief of Staff to the Flag Officer Submarines in December 1956. After that he became Captain of the Boys' Training Establishment HMS Ganges in January 1959, Flag Officer Submarines in September 1961, and Chief Polaris Executive in spring 1963 before retiring in September 1968.

== Early life ==
Hugh Stirling Mackenzie was born in Inverness, Scotland, on 3 July 1913, the son of Dr Theodore Charles Mackenzie, the medical superintendent of the Inverness District Asylum, and his wife, Margaret (Madge) née Wilson. His home, and birthplace, was Ruigh-Ard, the superintendent's residence. He had two older brothers, Charles and Alec, and a younger sister, Margaret.

At the age of nine, he was sent to Cargilfield Preparatory School, where his brother Charles was head boy, followed by his brother Alec the next year. In 1924, he appeared before the interview board and was given a medical examination as the first steps to admission to the Royal Naval College, Dartmouth. He was initially rejected on the grounds of deficient eyesight, but his father lodged an appeal, and had his sight examined by an eye specialist in Edinburgh, who declared that it met the Navy's standards. Another test at Queen Anne's Mansions in London cleared the way for him to sit the entrance examinations, which he passed.

== Early naval career ==
Mackenzie entered the Royal Naval College in January 1927, one of 51 members of the Anson Term, three of whom would not graduate in July 1930. They then received leave that lasted until September, which Mackenzie spent at home with his parents and three siblings at Ruigh-Ard. Due to cutbacks, there was no Cadet Training Cruiser for the class, and they were posted to the fleet for additional training. Mackenzie was posted to the battleship HMS Ramillies, part of the Mediterranean Fleet's 1st Battle Squadron. He embarked for the Mediterranean on the P&O ocean liner SS Rawalpindi, on which the new fleet commander, Admiral Sir William Wordsworth Fisher, was also travelling, completing the voyage on the battleship HMS Revenge. In addition to service on Ramillies, Mackenzie, who was promoted from officer cadet to midshipman on 1 May 1931, spent a fortnight on the aircraft carrier HMS Glorious and three months on the destroyers HMS Worcester and Achates in the summer of 1932 in order to gain familiarity with the work of various ships of the fleet.

At the conclusion of his tour of duty in the Mediterranean in July 1933, Mackenzie passed his sub lieutenant's examination, and returned to England on the destroyer HMS Brazen to rejoin the Anson Term for the six-month sub lieutenant's course at the Royal Naval College, Greenwich. After coursework that was interrupted by an operation on his left inner ear at the Royal Naval Hospital, Chatham, the midshipmen moved on to specialist courses in gunnery, torpedo, navigation and signals at HMS Excellent, Vernon, Dryad and Mercury. He was promoted to sub lieutenant, with seniority backdated to 16 March 1934. Not liking the life on battleships, he applied for submarine duty. He was accepted, and sent to HMS Dolphin in January 1935, where he was trained as a submariner.

Mackenzie was posted to HMS Rainbow, one of the boats of the 4th Submarine Flotilla, which was based in Hong Kong as part of the China Station. During the summer, the flotilla moved north to Weihaiwei to escape the heat and humidity. He was promoted to lieutenant, with seniority backdated to 16 October 1935, and returned to England via Japan and the Trans-Canada Railway in August 1937. He joined the 2nd Submarine Flotilla, which was part of the Home Fleet, and based at Devonport. He was given command of HMS Mist, an old coal burner that was manned by spare crewmen assigned to the flotilla and commanded by the spare lieutenant. Soon after, the Mist was ordered to join the reserve fleet, into which she was reluctantly accepted. In May 1938, Mackenzie was assigned to HMS Seahorse. There was a serious incident when Seahorse was accidentally rammed by the destroyer HMS Foxhound. The submarine dived to avoid the destroyer, which did not detect it on asdic, but suffered damage to its periscopes. Both ships took several weeks to repair.

== Second World War ==
=== Osiris ===
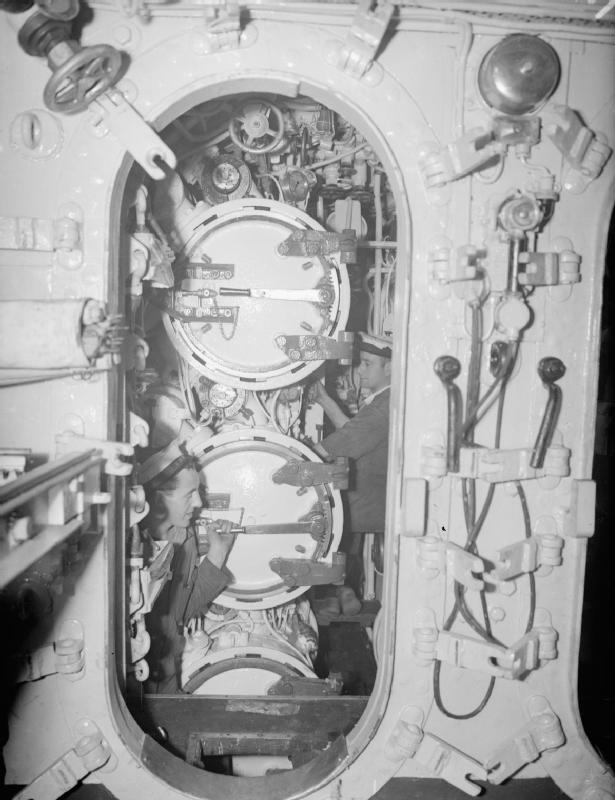
On board HMS Osiris. Torpedo hands at the three port forward tubes. Osiris had eight tubes, six forward and two aft.

In April 1939, Mackenzie was posted to HMS Osiris. The boat was almost lost during a test dive when a rivet popped out. On 27 September 1939, Osiris sailed for Malta to join the 1st Submarine Flotilla. She embarked on her first war patrol on 31 May 1940, and was at sea when Italy declared war on the UK on 10 June 1940. On the night of 16 August, Osiris was on her third war patrol, attempting to interdict shipping between Italy and Albania, when she sighted a cargo ship off the Albanian coast. The ship, the 1,970-gross-register-ton (5,600 m^{3}) Morea, was empty and riding high in the water. Two torpedoes were fired at 2,000 yards (1,800 m) range, but apparently passed beneath her. Osiris then closed to within 500 yards (460 m) and fired two more torpedoes, which also missed. She then surfaced and engaged Morea with her deck gun. Despite the brilliant flashes and considerable noise from the deck gun, there was no sign of activity on board, and shells were pumped into Morea until she started to sink.

Osiris departed Malta for her next war patrol on 9 September 1940, returning to the same vicinity. She found the area rich with targets moving troops and supplies from Italy to Albania for what would soon be revealed to be the Italian invasion of Greece. Osiris attempted to engage them, but for one reason or another, a whole series of attacks failed. On 13 September, she fired two salvoes of two torpedoes each at a range of 2,000 yards (1,800 m) at a convoy of three ships escorted by destroyers; all missed. But on 22 September she fired a full six-torpedo spread at a convoy at 2,000 yards (1,800 m) range. At first the crew thought that the torpedoes had again missed; but then there was an explosion, and the Italian torpedo boat Palestro was sunk. On returning to Alexandria, a launch brought the Osiris a Jolly Roger, which she flew to indicate a success.

It was Mackenzie's last patrol in Osiris. He received orders to return to England for the "Perisher", the five-week submarine Commanding Officers Qualifying Course. Because the Mediterranean was closed due to the war, he had to sail round the Cape of Good Hope in the MV Britannic. He was formally declared to have qualified for command of a submarine in February 1941, and assigned to the 7th Submarine Flotilla as a spare commanding officer. On 7 March 1941, he was given temporary command of an old boat used for training, HMS H28. Heading down Lough Foyle in the early morning darkness on 10 March showing navigation lights, she encountered the MV Lairdsbank heading in the opposite direction on the port (incorrect) side. As Lairdsbank approached the submarine, but without sighting it, she suddenly veered to starboard. Mackenzie ordered "full astern", but the two collided. Fortunately, although the bow of H28 was crumpled, the boat remained watertight, and Mackenzie was able to return to Derry for repairs. Lairdsbank suffered no damage and was unaware that there had been a collision. Admiral Max Horton told Mackenzie not to do it again. On 14 April, Mackenzie assumed command of another training boat, HMS H43.

=== Thrasher ===
In June 1941, Mackenzie received orders to rejoin the Mediterranean Fleet. This time he travelled to Alexandria through the Mediterranean as a passenger on the submarine HMS Rorqual. On 12 October, he assumed command of the submarine HMS Thrasher. A few days later he set out on his first war patrol in her (but Thrasher's fifth), sinking an Italian schooner with the deck gun, and unsuccessfully engaged an Italian minesweeper. On the next patrol, Mackenzie attacked a three-ship convoy on 25 November, sinking the 3,150-gross-register-ton (8,900 m^{3}) Italian cargo ship Attilio Deffenu with a torpedo. Thrasher had orders to insert a party of Yugoslav agents under the command of Stanislav Rapotec, but the mission was cancelled and Thrasher returned them to Alexandria. Thrasher set out again in January 1942, and found a large ship with an escort. Failing to gain a firing position, Mackenzie surfaced, overtook them, and attacked, sinking the 5,000-gross-register-ton (14,000 m^{3}) Italian cargo ship Fedora.

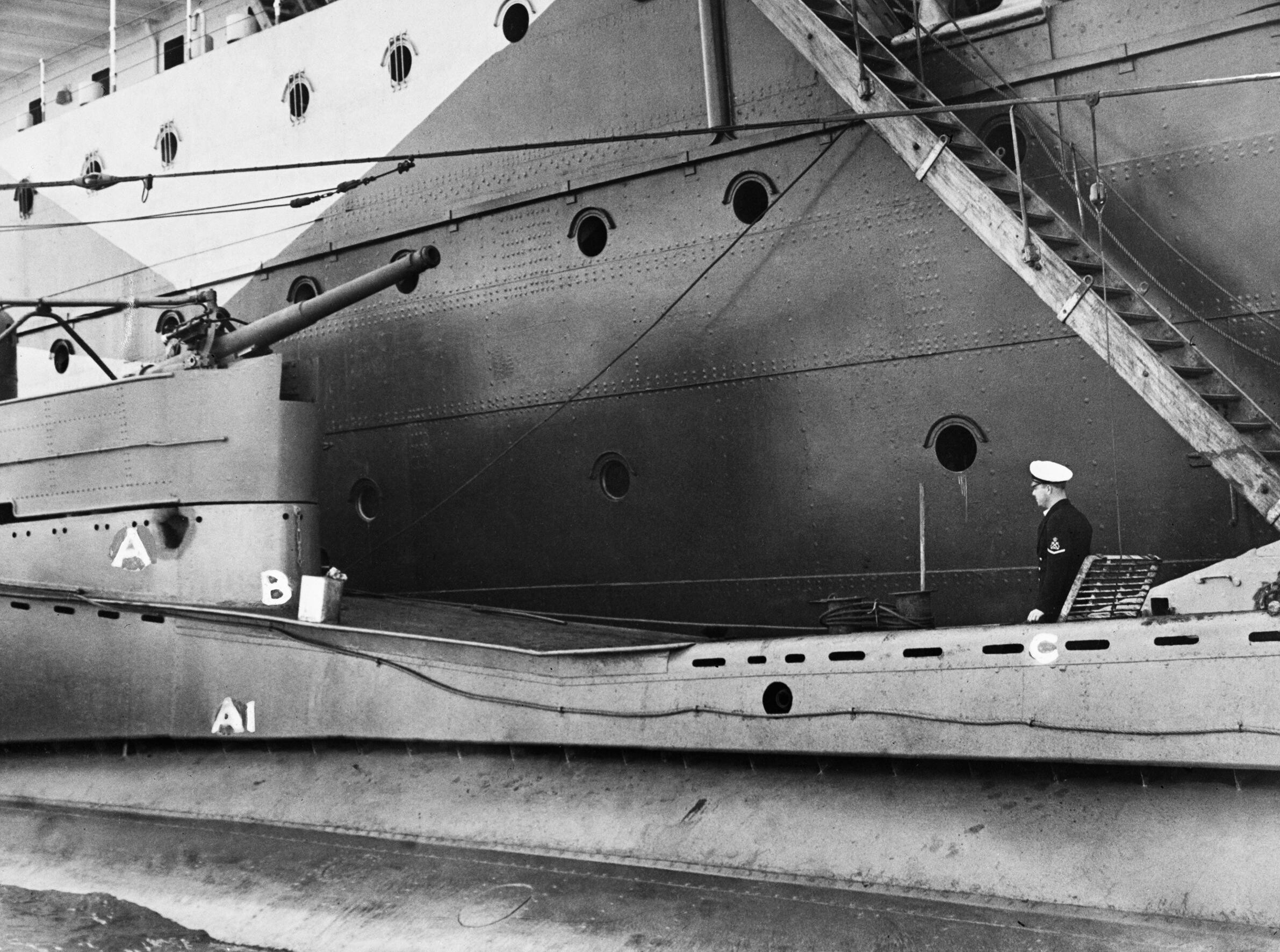
Damage to the casing of HMS Thrasher after two bombs struck her off Crete on the night of 15–16 February 1942. A – where bomb penetrated the gun platform. A1 – the position where the bomb was discovered inside the casing. B – Position where the second unexploded bomb was discovered lying on the casing; the bomb is represented by the tin can. C – Petty Officer Gould, VC, stands in the casing-hatch through which bomb from A1 was dragged.

Thrasher set out on her eighth war patrol on 13 February 1942. Off Suda Bay, Crete, Mackenzie found the 1,756-gross-register-ton (4,970 m^{3}) German merchant ship Arkadia. It had five escorts, which Mackenzie took to be an indication that it was important. He fired a salvo of four torpedoes, and believed that he had hit something, but all missed. Thrasher was engaged by aircraft and surface ships, which dropped 33 depth charges. After Thrasher surfaced that night, two unexploded bombs were discovered. The first was disposed of by being dragged forward and lowered over the bow. The second presented more difficulty.

Lieutenant Roberts and Petty Officer Gould volunteered to remove the bombs, which were of a type unknown to them. The danger in dealing with the second bomb was very great. To reach it they had to go through the casing which was so low that they had to lie at full length to move in it. Through this narrow space, in complete darkness, they pushed and dragged the bomb for a distance of some 20 feet until it could be lowered over the side. Every time the bomb was moved there was a loud twanging noise as of a broken spring which.added nothing to their peace of mind. This deed was the more gallant as HMS Thrasher's presence was known to the enemy; she was close to the enemy coast, and in waters where his patrols were known to be active day and night. There was a very great chance, and they knew it, that the submarine might have to crash-dive while they were in the casing. Had this happened they must have been drowned.

On reading the patrol report, Admiral Andrew Cunningham ordered Mackenzie to write up the incident for gallantry awards to Roberts and Gould. They were awarded the Victoria Cross.

On 9 April, Mackenzie attacked a convoy. He fired a salvo of three torpedoes at the 1,029-gross-register-ton (2,910 m^{3}) Italian merchant ship Gala. Although he observed a hit, he saw no evidence that it had sunk. It had. He attacked another small convoy on 13 April, sinking the 2,297-gross-register-ton (6,500 m^{3}) German army cargo ship Atlas, which was struck by two torpedoes from a three torpedo salvo. Escort vessels dropped 19 depth charges on Thrasher. When she came up to periscope depth, Mackenzie saw one escort and a lighter. The escort left to rejoin the convoy, and Mackenzie surfaced in broad daylight and sank the lighter, the Italian Pilo 210 with his deck gun. On her tenth patrol, Mackenzie attacked the Italian armed merchant cruiser Brioni on 16 May, but she spotted the torpedoes and evaded them. Three days later he attacked and sank the 1,160-gross-register-ton (3,300 m^{3}) Italian merchant ship Penelope. On her eleventh war patrol, Mackenzie sighted two cargo ships escorted by the Italian torpedo boat Perseo, and sank the 1,480-gross-register-ton (4,200 m^{3}) Italian merchant Sant Antonio. Six days later he sighted the Italian sloop Diana, Mussolini's yacht, and sank it. On 4 July, a German U-boat, U-77, was sighted, but it evaded both Thrasher's torpedoes and her gunfire. Thrasher was attacked by a Fleet Air Arm Fairey Swordfish of No. 815 Squadron on 26 July, causing considerable damage.

After repairs were effected, Thrasher set out again in September. Responding to a report from a shadowing Vickers Wellington bomber of an enemy ship escorted by two destroyers, Thrasher raced to intercept them on 4 September. This was the 1,589-gross-register-ton (4,500 m^{3}) Italian merchant ship Padenna, escorted by the Castore and Lupo. Mackenzie lined up an attack, but was thwarted at the last minute by the escorts. He then fired a salvo of three torpedoes from the stern torpedo tubes. Two hit, and the Wellington pilot reported that the ship blew up. On the next patrol Mackenzie sank a couple of schooners with gunfire on 12 October, the Italian tugboat Roma on 19 October, and the 1,980-gross-register-ton (5,600 m^{3}) Italian merchant ship Lero on 20 October. Thrasher made an abortive attack on two merchant ships on 25 October, and was subjected to a severe depth charging by the two escorts, but managed to get away.

This was Mackenzie's last war patrol in Thrasher, which now returned to the UK. He was credited with sinking 40,000 gross register tons (110,000 m^{3}) of enemy shipping. He was made a Companion of the Distinguished Service Order on 30 June 1942, and was promoted to lieutenant commander on 23 October, with seniority of 16 October. He was awarded a bar to his Distinguished Service Order on 19 January 1943. He was sent on a publicity tour to increase public awareness of the role that submarines were playing in the conflict, and appeared in a war movie, We Dive at Dawn.

=== Tantalus ===
On 2 April 1943, Mackenzie assumed command of the submarine HMS Tantalus, a new boat which departed the builder's yard at Barrow-in-Furness on 31 May 1943. After a work-up patrol in the Norwegian Sea, Tantalus was assigned to the 4th Submarine Flotilla, which was part of the Eastern Fleet, and based at Trincomalee, Ceylon. She departed in January 1944, and conducted three war patrols in the Straits of Malacca between April and August 1944, sinking two Malaysian tug boats by gunfire, the Kampung Besar on 19 April and the Pulo Salanama on 29 April. On 3 May, Mackenzie torpedoed and sank the 3,165-gross-register-ton (8,960 m^{3}) Japanese Army cargo ship Amagi Maru, and on 10 June sank the small Japanese army cargo ship Hiyoshi Maru with gunfire. He sighted the Japanese submarine I-166 on 17 July, but it suddenly altered course and Mackenzie did not fire his torpedoes. It did not get away, however, as it was sunk by HMS Telemachus later that day.

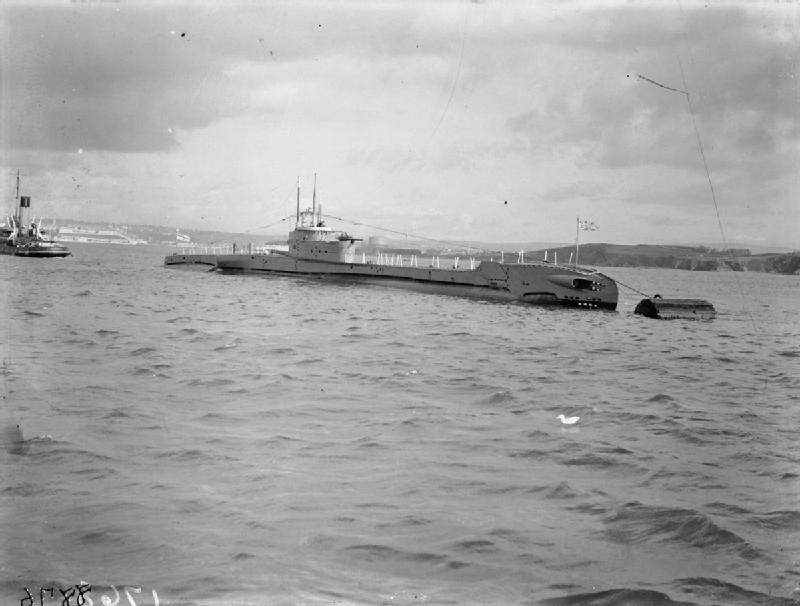
HMS Tantalus in Plymouth Sound in August 1945

As the picking seemed slim, the decision was taken to form a new submarine flotilla, the 8th Submarine Flotilla, based at Fremantle, Western Australia, as part of the British Pacific Fleet, although it would be under the operational control of COMSUBSOUWESPAC, Rear Admiral James Fyfe, USN. Mackenzie broke his ribs, so Lieutenant J. Nash took Tantalus on a war patrol to Australia, while Mackenzie travelled to Fremantle on the submarine depot ship HMS Maidstone.

With Mackenzie back in command on the next war patrol, Tantalus attacked a convoy on 2 November. He torpedoed and sank the 1,915-gross-register-ton (5,420 m^{3}) Japanese cargo ship Hachijin Maru, and damaged one of the escorts, the Japanese submarine chaser Ch-1. He also sank a small Japanese coaster, Pahang Maru on 7 November that was heading to Bangkok with 75 drums of oil fuel and 9 drums of lubricating oil. Tantalus plucked eleven survivors from the water: nine Malays, a Chinese and a Japanese soldier. The Malays were transferred to the next junk Tantalus encountered, while the other two were taken to Australia, where the Japanese soldier was handed over to the Australian Army. On 21 November Tantalus landed a party on Merapas Island in support of Operation Rimau, but the commandos that they expected to find were not there.

In January 1945, Tantalus conducted a 55-day patrol covering 11,692 miles (18,816 km), making it the longest patrol of any British submarine during the war. The vessels sunk were small, and at one point ten Chinese and two Japanese were picked up from a fishing boat that Tantalus sank. The big game was sighted on 11 February 1945: the Japanese battleship-carriers Ise and Hyūga and the light cruiser Ōyodo, escorted by the destroyers Kasumi, Asashimo and Hatsushimo, bound for Japan. Unfortunately, Mackenzie was unable to manoeuvre Tantalus into a firing position. Tantalus returned home in March 1945. Mackenzie was awarded the Distinguished Service Cross on 19 June 1945.

== Post-war career ==
Mackenzie was posted to Derry, where he was part of a group of submariners in charge of about fifty German Type VII, Type IX and Type XXI U-boats that had surrendered. While there, he met Third Officer Helen Maureen Bradish-Ellames, a Women's Royal Naval Service officer who worked on the staff in Derry. In January 1946, with the war over, he became an instructor on the Perisher course. He was promoted to commander on 12 July 1946, with seniority of 30 June 1946. He married Maureen Bradish-Ellames on 10 August 1946; they had a son and two daughters.

In January 1948, Mackenzie became staff Officer, Operations, (SOO) on the staff of the Flag Officer Submarines, Rear Admiral Sir John Mansfield, despite having never attended the staff college course. After so many years in submarines, he expressed a desire to return to the surface navy in 1950, and was posted to the cruiser HMS Liverpool, the flagship of the 1st Cruiser Squadron in the Mediterranean, as its executive officer. He was promoted to captain on 31 December 1951.

Mackenzie's next assignment was as commanding the Underwater Detection Establishment (UDE), a post normally held by an anti-submarine specialist rather than a submariner and was commander of the 1st Destroyer Squadron from June 1954 until December 1956. During a training exercise, his ship, HMS Chevron was damaged in a collision with the aircraft carrier HMS Centaur. Mackenzie received a dressing down from the Commander-in-Chief, Mediterranean Fleet, Admiral Lord Mountbatten. He returned to submarines as Chief of Staff to the Flag Officer Submarines, Rear Admiral Wilfrid Woods, and then Rear Admiral Bertram Taylor. On a visit to the United States, he was given a tour of the first nuclear-powered submarine, the USS Nautilus. After that he became Captain of the Boys' Training Establishment HMS Ganges at Shotley, Suffolk, in January 1959. While there he completed the two-month Senior Officer's War Course at Greenwich.

Promoted to rear admiral on 7 July 1961, Mackenzie became Flag Officer Submarines in September 1961. He visited Australia in March 1962, and inspected the submarines of the 4th Submarine Flotilla based there, HMS Tabard, Tapir and Trump. He warned the Australian government that Britain could no longer afford to maintain submarines in Australia, and recommended that Australia acquire its own submarines, preferably nuclear-powered. The advice did not go down well, but within a few years the British boats were withdrawn, and the Royal Australian Navy acquired diesel-powered Oberon-class submarines to replace them.

Mackenzie's tenure as Flag Officer Submarines was brief. On 26 December 1962 he was notified that he would be appointed the Chief Polaris Executive (CPE). He described this as "the most strenuous five years of my whole career, but also in the end the most satisfying, because of their direct contribution to the ultimate defence of this country." He established his office and that of his immediate staff in London, which he considered was necessary in order to be in immediate contact with the Admiralty, the Ministers, and the key departments. He was initially given two rooms and a closet at the Admiralty. Most of the Polaris Executive was located in Bath, Somerset, where the Admiralty's technical and logistics departments had been relocated in 1938. He was made a Companion of the Order of the Bath in the 1963 New Year Honours, promoted to vice admiral on 19 August 1964, and appointed a Knight Commander of the Order of the Bath in the 1966 Birthday Honours. The Polaris project was completed on time, with the first successful firing of a Polaris missile conducted off Cape Canaveral on 15 February 1968, and within budget.

== Later life ==
Mackenzie retired on 20 September 1968. He was chairman of the Navy League of Great Britain from 1969 to 1974, and the director of the Atlantic Salmon Research Trust from 1969 to 1979, and was its chairman from 1979 to 1983. In July 1982, he was involved in a serious motor vehicle accident on the M1 motorway. An overtaking vehicle careened into the back of his car and knocked it off the road. The petrol tank ruptured and the car caught on fire. Despite burns to 15 per cent of his body, he was able to drag clear his wife Maureen, who suffered burns to 40 per cent of her body. Both were admitted to the burns unit at the Leicester Royal Infirmary.

Mackenzie published his memoirs, titled The Sword of Damocles, in 1995. On 28 March 1996, he attended a ceremony at the submarine base at Faslane, to mark the decommissioning of HMS Repulse, the last of the four Resolution-class submarines whose construction he had overseen in the 1960s. On 8 October 1996, he suffered a fatal heart attack at his home Puttenham, Surrey. A service of thanksgiving was held in Guildford Cathedral on 8 February 1997. His remains were cremated, and the ashes buried near Inverness.

== Notes ==
Military offices
| Preceded by Arthur Hezlet | Flag Officer Submarines; 1961–1963 | Succeeded by Horace Law |
