= Admiral Sinclair =

Admiral Sinclair may refer to:

- Hugh Sinclair (1873–1939), British Royal Navy admiral
- Peter Sinclair (governor) (born 1934), Royal Australian Navy rear admiral
- William Sinclair, 1st Earl of Caithness (1410–1480), Lord High Admiral of Scotland
