= Commodore Submarine Service =

Post in the Royal Navy

- Ensign of the Royal Navy

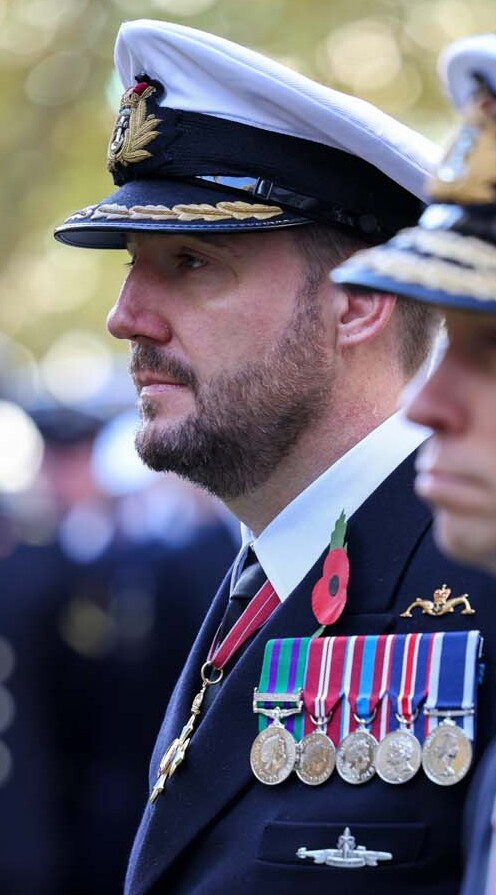
- Incumbent; Commodore Ben Haskins CBE since August 2025
- Ministry of Defence
- Member of: Board of Admiralty, Admiralty Board
- Reports to: Fleet Commander
- Nominator: Secretary of State for Defence
- Appointer: Prime Minister; Subject to formal approval by the Queen-in-Council
- Term length: Not fixed (typically 2–3 years)
- Inaugural holder: Rear-Admiral Douglas Dent
- Formation: 1901

Commodore Submarine Service is a post in the Royal Navy which involves command of the Royal Navy Submarine Service. It evolved from the post of Inspecting Captain of Submarines in 1901 and would later evolve to become the post of Flag Officer Submarines in 1944.

== History ==
In 1904 the Admiralty created the post of Inspecting Captain of Submarines which lasted until August 1912 when Captain Roger J. B. Keyes was appointed Commodore, Submarine Service. He held that position until February 1919 when the post holder was renamed Chief of the Submarine Service. It was for many years located at HMS Dolphin in Hampshire.

On 30 August 1939 Rear Admiral Submarines, Rear Admiral Bertram Watson, moved his headquarters from Gosport to Aberdour, Scotland, though the administrative staff remained at Gosport. The RN started the Second World War with 60 submarines. On 31 August 1939 the Second Submarine Flotilla at Dundee (Forth and ten submarines) and the Sixth Submarine Flotilla at Blyth (Titania and six submarines) were part of the Home Fleet. The submarines Clyde and Severn, part of the Seventh Submarine Flotilla, were at Freetown under the orders of the Commander-in-Chief, South Atlantic. Ten submarines were in the Mediterranean along with the depot ship Maidstone (First Submarine Flotilla); and the submarine depot ship Medway and the Fourth Submarine Flotilla were under the Commander-in-Chief, China, split between Singapore and Hong Kong. Roskill writes that the effective naval strength of the British Empire on the outbreak of war included 38 submarines.

During the war the major operating arenas were the Norwegian waters; the Mediterranean where the Tenth Submarine Flotilla fought a successful battle against the Axis replenishment route to North Africa; and the Far East where Royal Navy submarines disrupted Japanese shipping operating in the Malacca Straits.

In January 1940, Vice-Admiral Max Horton was made Rear Admiral Submarines. Horton's biographer, Rear Admiral William S. Chalmers, cites the opinion that a new regulation, which required the post holder to be an officer who had served aboard submarines in the Great War, was forced through for the sole purpose of ensuring that Horton was on a very short list of qualifiers for this post, almost ensuring his rapid transfer to Aberdour, so great was the desire of some within the Admiralty to have Horton revitalize the submarine arm.

From 1953 the Flag Officer Submarines was dual-hatted as NATO Commander Submarine Force Eastern Atlantic (COMSUBEASTLANT) under Commander Submarine Allied Command Atlantic (COMSUBACLANT), a major command of Supreme Allied Commander Atlantic. Flag Officer Submarines moved from Dolphin to the Northwood Headquarters in 1978. From 1993 the post of Flag Officer Submarines was dual-hatted with the post of Commander Operations.

In 2015, Rear Admiral John Weale was appointed Rear Admiral Submarines/Assistant Chief of Naval Staff Submarines, while Rear Admiral Robert Tarrant is Commander Operations (Royal Navy), two distinct posts from 2015. In 2016, a new entity, the Submarine Flotilla, was technically established, but its commander's post was to be held by Commander Faslane Flotilla. A single submarine base was to be achieved by 2020 when HMS Talent and HMS Triumph moved their homeports to the Clyde in 2019 and 2020 respectively.

On 1 April 2020, the post of Commander Submarine Flotilla was announced at HMNB Clyde, seemingly a renaming of the post of Commander Faslane Flotilla.

As of December 2020, official Royal Navy Freedom of Information responses said that "the combined 2* Rear Admiral post of Assistant Chief of the Naval Staff (ACNS) (Submarines)(SM), Flag Officer Scotland and Northern Ireland (FOSNI) and Rear Admiral Submarines has been disestablished. The ACNS (SM) role and Rear Admiral Submarines roles have been [lowered] to Commodore and retitled Deputy Director Submarines and Commodore Submarine Service. The role of Flag Officer Scotland and Northern Ireland role has been retitled as Senior Naval Officer Scotland and Northern Ireland (SNOSNI) and is currently held by 1* Deputy Director Submarines."

== Commanding ==
Post holders have included:

=== Inspecting Captain of Submarines ===
- Captain Reginald H. S. Bacon, 20 August 1901 – 21 October 1904 Initial appointment title was Inspecting Captain of Submarine Boats (Richard Compton-Hall, 115).
- Captain Edgar Lees, 21 October 1904, (later RAdm.)
- Captain Sydney S. Hall, 12 November 1906 – 14 November 1910 (later Adm.)
- Captain Roger J. B. Keyes, 14 November 1910 - July 1912

=== Commodore Submarine Service ===
- Commodore Roger J. B. Keyes, August 1912 – February 1915
- Commodore Sydney S. Hall, 1915 –

=== Chief of the Submarine Service ===
- Rear-Admiral Douglas Dent (1919–1921)
- Rear-Admiral Hugh Sinclair (1921–1923)
- Vice-Admiral Wilmot Nicholson (1923–1925)
- Rear-Admiral Vernon Haggard (1925–1927)
- Rear-Admiral Henry Grace (1927–1929)

=== Rear-Admiral Submarines ===
- Rear-Admiral Martin Dunbar-Nasmith (1929–1931)
- Rear-Admiral Charles Little (1931–1932)
- Rear-Admiral Noel Laurence (1932–1934)
- Rear-Admiral Cecil Talbot (1934–1936)
- Rear-Admiral Robert Raikes (1936–1938)
- Rear-Admiral Bertram Watson (1938–1940)
- Vice-Admiral Sir Max Horton (1940–1942)
- Rear-Admiral Claud Barry (1942–1944)

=== Flag Officer Submarines ===
- Rear-Admiral George Creasy (1944–1946)
- Vice-Admiral Sir John Mansfield (1946–1948)
- Rear-Admiral Guy Grantham (1948–1950)
- Rear-Admiral Sydney Raw (1950–1952)
- Rear-Admiral George Simpson (1952–1954)
- Rear-Admiral George Fawkes (1954–1955)
- Rear-Admiral Wilfrid Woods (1955–1957)
- Rear-Admiral Bertram Taylor (1957–1959)
- Rear-Admiral Arthur Hezlet (1959–1961)
- Rear-Admiral Hugh Mackenzie (1961–1963)
- Rear-Admiral Horace Law (1963–1965)
- Rear-Admiral Ian McGeoch (1965–1967)
- Vice-Admiral Sir Michael Pollock (1967–1969)
- Vice-Admiral Sir John Roxburgh (1969–1972)
- Vice-Admiral Anthony Troup (1972–1974)
- Vice-Admiral Sir Iwan Raikes (1974–1976)
- Vice-Admiral John Fieldhouse (1976–1978)
- Vice-Admiral Robert Squires (1978–1981)
- Vice-Admiral Sir Peter Herbert (1981–1983)
- Vice-Admiral Sir John Woodward (1983–1984)
- Rear-Admiral Richard Heaslip (1984–1987)
- Rear-Admiral Frank Grenier (1987–1989)
- Vice-Admiral Sir John Coward (1989–1991)
- Vice-Admiral Toby Frere (1991–1994)
- Rear-Admiral Roger Lane-Nott (1994–1996)
- Admiral James Perowne (1996–1998)
- Rear-Admiral Robert Stevens (1998–2001)
- Rear-Admiral Niall Kilgour (2001–February 2002)

=== Rear-Admiral Submarines ===
- Rear-Admiral Niall Kilgour (February 2002 – 2004), post became the 'tribal chief' of Royal Navy submarines
- Rear-Admiral Ian Corder (2011-2013)
- Rear-Admiral Matt Parr (2013-2015)
- Rear-Admiral Robert Tarrant (2015)
- Rear Admiral John Weale (2015-2020)

=== Commodore Submarine Service ===
- Commodore James Perks CBE (2020–2022): as of December 2020, Senior Naval Officer Scotland and Northern Ireland, Deputy Director Submarines, and Commodore Submarine Service.
- Commodore Paul Dunn OBE (2022–2025)
- Commodore Ben Haskins (2025–present)

== Sources ==
- Conley, Dan (2014). Cold War Command: The Dramatic Story of a Nuclear Submariner. Seaforth Publishing. ISBN 9781848327696.
- Chalmers, William (1954). Max Horton and the Western Approaches: A biography of Admiral Sir Max Kennedy Horton. Hodder & Stoughton.
