= Wilfrid Woods =

Royal Navy Admiral (1906-1975)

Admiral Sir Wilfrid Woods GBE KCB DSO* DL
- Born: 19 February 1906; Southsea, Portsmouth
- Died: 1 January 1975 (aged 68); Burley, Hampshire
- Alma mater: Royal Naval College, Osborne, Britannia Royal Naval College
- Relatives: Wilfrid Wentworth Woods (Father)
- Military career
- Allegiance: United Kingdom
- Branch: Royal Navy
- Service years: 1926–1965
- Rank: Admiral
- Commands: Commander-in-Chief, Portsmouth (1963–65); Home Fleet (1960–63); Flag Officer Submarines (1955–57); HMS Indomitable (1952–53); 3rd Submarine Flotilla (1945–46); HMS Forth (1945–46); HMS Centurion (1944); HMS Triumph (1940–41); HMS Seahorse (1935–36)
- Conflicts: Second World War
- Awards: Knight Grand Cross of the Order of the British Empire; Knight Commander of the Order of the Bath; Distinguished Service Order & Bar; Order of the White Eagle (Yugoslavia); Grand Commander of the Royal Order of George I (Greece)
- Other work: Commodore RN Sailing Association (1963–66); Chairman, RNLI (1968–72); President, Sea Cadet Corps Sports Council (1966); Chairman, Foudroyant Trust (1967); Deputy Lieutenant of Hampshire

Admiral Sir Wilfrid John Wentworth Woods, GBE, KCB, DSO & Bar, DL (9 February 1906 – 1 January 1975) was a Royal Navy officer who served in the Submarine Service in the Mediterranean.

== Early life ==
Wilfrid Woods was born on 19 February 1906 at Southsea in Hampshire to colonial administrator Sir Wilfrid Woods KCMG, KBE and Ethel Maud Palmer. He attended school at Seabrooke Lodge at Hythe before going to the Royal Naval College, Osborne and the Britannia Royal Naval College.

== Royal Navy ==
=== Pre-war service ===
Woods was commissioned into the Royal Navy as a sub-lieutenant in 1926 and specialised in submarines. His first submarine command came in 1935 as a lieutenant in HMS Seahorse before promotion to lieutenant-commander in HMS Nelson a year later. He then attended the Royal Navy Staff College in 1939.

=== Second World War ===
With the outbreak of the Second World War, Woods was serving on the staff of the Sixth Submarine Flotilla in UK waters before moving to the Mediterranean theatre in HMS Triumph in 1940. For his work in Triumph he was awarded the DSO and bar as well as the White Eagle of Yugoslavia. Woods moved to become staff officer (operations) on the staff of the Commander in Chief, Mediterranean.

Leaving the Mediterranean to participate in Operation Overlord he was appointed to command HMS Centurion. The ship was scuttled as part of a Mulberry Harbour.

=== Post war service ===
HMS Forth was his next command along with command with the 3rd Submarine Flotilla. His career took him on to Chief Staff Officer to Flag Officer Submarines in 1947. He went to the Imperial Defence College in 1951 following a period as Director of Torpedo, Anti-submarine and Mine Warfare. A return to the sea came with the command of HMS Indomitable and then back to the Mediterranean as chief of staff to the commander in chief. He was promoted from commodore to rear-admiral in 1955.

Woods' next appointment saw him serve as Flag Officer Submarines from December 1955 to November 1957. From there he was promoted to vice-admiral in 1958 and made NATO Deputy Supreme Allied Commander, Atlantic. He rose to the rank of admiral in July 1960 and appointed to the post of Commander in Chief Home Fleet and then NATO Commander in Chief, Eastern Atlantic Area. In May 1962 he was made First and Principal Naval ADC to Queen Elizabeth II.

He was Commander in Chief, Portsmouth and Allied Commander in Chief, Channel between 1963 and his retirement in 1965.

== Later life ==
After retiring from the Royal Navy, he was Deputy Lieutenant for Hampshire and spent four years as chairman of the RNLI. During his chairmanship the boat building programme was expanded and a £400,000 deficit cleared.

== Bibliography ==
- Richard Compton-Hall, Woods, Sir Wilfrid John Wentworth (1906–1975), Oxford Dictionary of National Biography, Oxford University Press, 2004 retrieved 18 Aug 2008

Military offices
Preceded by George Fawkes	Flag Officer Submarines; 1955–1957	Succeeded by Bertram Taylor
Preceded by Sir John Eaton	Deputy Supreme Allied Commander Atlantic; 1958–1960	Succeeded by Sir Charles Evans
Preceded by Sir William Davis	Commander in Chief, Home Fleet; 1960–1963	Succeeded by Sir Charles Madden
Preceded by Sir Alexander Bingley	Commander-in-Chief, Portsmouth; 1963–1965	Succeeded by Sir Varyl Begg
Honorary titles
Preceded by Sir Caspar John	First and Principal Naval Aide-de-Camp; 1962–1965	Succeeded by Sir Desmond Dreyer
