= Governor Grantham =

Governor Grantham may refer to:

- Alexander Grantham (1899–1978), Governor of Fiji from 1946 to 1947 and Governor of Hong Kong from 1947to 1957
- Guy Grantham (1900–1992), Governor of Malta from 1959 to 1962
