= Douglas Dent =

British Royal Navy officer (1869–1959)

Admiral Douglas Dent CB CMG
- Born: 7 August 1869
- Died: 11 July 1959 (aged 89)
- Military career
- Allegiance: United Kingdom
- Branch: Royal Navy
- Service years: 1882–1924
- Rank: Admiral
- Commands: HMS Blenheim; HMS Irresistible; HMS Edgar; HMS Prince of Wales; HMS Centurion
- Conflicts: World War I
- Awards: Companion of the Order of the Bath; Companion of the Order of St Michael and St George

Admiral Douglas Lionel Dent CB CMG (7 August 1869 – 11 July 1959) was a Royal Navy officer who became Chief of the Submarine Service.

== Naval career ==
Born the son of Rear Admiral Charles Calmady Bayley Dent, Dent joined the Royal Navy in July 1882. He was posted to HMS President, drill-ship of the Royal Naval Reserve, in August 1902, for service with the Ordnance Committee.

Promoted to captain on 30 June 1908, he became commanding officer of the cruiser HMS Blenheim in March 1910.

Dent served in the First World War becoming commanding officer of the battleship HMS Irresistible in January 1915, of the cruiser HMS Edgar in June 1915, of the battleship HMS Prince of Wales in June 1916 and of the battleship HMS Centurion in June 1917. He went on to be Chief of the Submarine Service in August 1919 and Director of Naval Equipment at the Admiralty in May 1922 before retiring in May 1924.

== Family ==
Dent married Olive Kate MacArthur; their children include Flying Officer Richard Ewer Dent.

Military offices
Preceded by New Post	Chief of the Submarine Service; 1919–1921	Succeeded by Hugh Sinclair
