= George Fawkes =

Royal Navy Rear Admiral (1903–1967)

Rear-Admiral George Fawkes CB CVO CBE
- Born: September 4, 1903
- Died: July 26, 1967 (aged 63)
- Military career
- Allegiance: United Kingdom
- Branch: Royal Navy
- Service years: 1920–1956
- Rank: Rear-Admiral
- Commands: HMS H50; HMS Otus; 8th Submarine Flotilla
- Conflicts: World War II
- Awards: Companion of the Order of the Bath; Commander of the Order of the British Empire; Commander of the Order of the British Empire

Rear-Admiral George Barney Hamley Fawkes, CB, CVO, CBE (4 September 1903 – 26 July 1967) was a Royal Navy officer who became Flag Officer Submarines.

== Naval career ==
Fawkes joined the Royal Navy in 1920. He became commanding officer of the submarine HMS H50 in April 1932 and of the submarine HMS Otus in April 1935. He served in the Second World War becoming commander of the 8th Submarine Flotilla, based at Gibraltar, in December 1940 and Chief of Staff to the Rear-Admiral, Submarines in December 1943.

Fawkes went on to be Chief of Staff to the Commander-in-Chief, America and West Indies Station in November 1946, Director of the Operations Division at the Admiralty in January 1949 and Chief of Staff to the Commander-in-Chief, Home Fleet in December 1951. His last appointment was as Flag Officer Submarines in February 1954 before retiring in January 1956.

== Family ==
In 1924 Fawkes married Winifred Joyce Deakin; they had one son. Following a divorce from his first wife, he married Suzette Flagler in 1949.

Military offices
Preceded by George Simpson	Flag Officer Submarines; 1954–1955	Succeeded by Wilfrid Woods
