= Bertram Taylor (Royal Navy officer) =

Royal Navy rear-admiral

Rear-Admiral Bertram Taylor CB DSC
- Born: 23 March 1906
- Died: 1970 (aged 63–64)
- Military career
- Allegiance: United Kingdom
- Branch: Royal Navy
- Rank: Rear-Admiral
- Commands: HMS Severn; HMS Bligh; HMS Exmoor
- Conflicts: World War II
- Awards: Companion of the Order of the Bath; Distinguished Service Cross

Rear-Admiral Bertram Wilfrid Taylor CB DSC (23 March 1906 – 1970) was a Royal Navy officer who became Flag Officer Submarines.

== Naval career ==
Taylor served in the Second World War becoming commanding officer of the submarine HMS Severn in May 1939, of the frigate HMS Bligh in January 1945 and of the destroyer HMS Exmoor in July 1945. He went on to be Chief of Staff to the Flag Officer Submarines in November 1950, Captain of the Fleet, Home Fleet in March 1954 and Flag Officer Submarines in November 1957. He was appointed a Companion of the Order of the Bath on 1 January 1959 before retiring in November 1959.

Military offices
Preceded by Wilfrid Woods	Flag Officer Submarines; 1957–1959	Succeeded by Arthur Hezlet
