= George Creasy =

Royal Navy Admiral of the Fleet (1895-1972)

Admiral of the Fleet Sir George Creasy GCB CBE DSO MVO DL
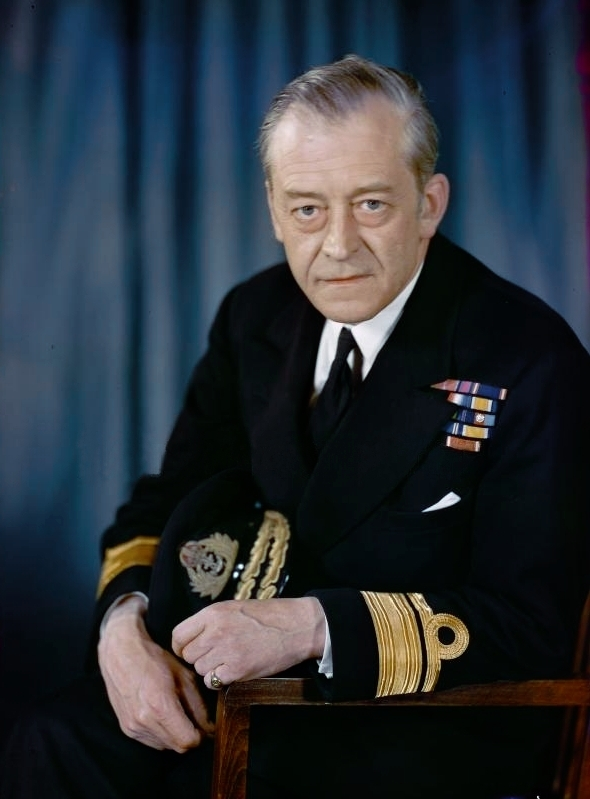
- Born: 13 October 1895; Badulla, Sri Lanka
- Died: 31 October 1972 (aged 77); Great Horkesley, Essex, England
- Burial place: St. Peter and St. Paul's Churchyard, Little Horkesley
- Military career
- Allegiance: United Kingdom
- Branch: Royal Navy
- Service years: 1908–1957
- Rank: Admiral of the Fleet
- Commands: Portsmouth Command (1954–57); Home Fleet (1952–54); Flag Officer Submarines (1944–46); HMS Duke of York (1942–44); HMS Codrington (1940); HMS Grenville (1938–40)
- Conflicts: First World War; Second World War
- Awards: Knight Grand Cross of the Order of the Bath; Commander of the Order of the British Empire; Distinguished Service Order; Member of the Royal Victorian Order; Commander of the Order of Orange-Nassau (Netherlands); Commander's Cross of the Order of Polonia Restituta (Poland); Commander of the Legion of Merit (United States)

Admiral of the Fleet Sir George Elvey Creasy, GCB, CBE, DSO, MVO, DL (13 October 1895 – 31 October 1972) was a senior Royal Navy officer. After serving as a junior officer in the First World War, during which he took part in operations at Heligoland Bight in 1917, he trained as a torpedo officer.

Creasy served in the Second World War, initially as commanding officer of HMS Grenville, which was sunk off Kentish Knock, and then transferred to the destroyer HMS Codrington, in which he led the rescue of Juliana of the Netherlands and then took part in the Dunkirk evacuation. He continued his war service as chief staff officer to the First Sea Lord, as director of anti-submarine warfare and then as flag captain to the commander-in-chief of Home Fleet before becoming chief staff officer to the naval commander-in-chief of the Allied Expeditionary Force, taking part in the planning and execution of the naval operations for the Normandy landings. He also served as Flag Officer Submarines, taking responsibility for receiving surrendered enemy submarines into British ports at the end of the war.

After the war Creasy became Flag Officer (Air), Far East and then Fifth Sea Lord and deputy chief of the naval staff (air). After that he became Vice Chief of the Naval Staff, then commander-in-chief of Home Fleet and, finally, Commander-in-Chief, Portsmouth.

== Naval career ==
=== Early career ===
Born the son of Leonard Creasy and Maud Creasy (née Elvey), Creasy was educated at the Royal Naval College, Osborne and the Royal Naval College, Dartmouth. He joined the Royal Navy as a cadet in September 1908 and was promoted to midshipman on his appointment to the battleship HMS Conqueror on 15 May 1913.

=== First World War ===
Creasy served in the First World War, initially in HMS Conqueror in the Grand Fleet but transferred to the torpedo-boat destroyer HMS Lively in the Harwich Force on 15 May 1915. After promotion to sub-lieutenant on 15 November 1915, he transferred to the destroyer HMS Milne in February 1916. Promoted again to lieutenant on 15 May 1917, he became first lieutenant in the destroyer HMS Nonsuch on the same date and took part in operations at Heligoland Bight later that year. He joined the Mining School at Portsmouth in May 1918 and then started the long course at the torpedo school HMS Vernon in November 1918.

=== Between the wars ===
Creasy successfully passed his exams at HMS Vernon and then became torpedo lieutenant in the destroyer HMS Malcolm in the Atlantic Fleet in July 1920. He joined the directing staff at HMS Vernon in July 1922 and, having attended the Royal Naval College, he was promoted to lieutenant-commander on 15 December 1924. He became torpedo officer in the cruiser HMS Frobisher, flagship of the 1st Cruiser Squadron in the Mediterranean Fleet, in April 1926, torpedo officer in the battleship HMS Warspite, flagship of the Mediterranean Fleet, in October 1926 and torpedo officer in the battleship HMS Rodney in the Atlantic Fleet in June 1928. Promoted to commander on 30 June 1930, he joined the directing staff at the Tactical Training School at Portsmouth in July 1930 and then became staff officer (operations) to the Commander-in-Chief, Atlantic Fleet in July 1932.

Creasey next became executive officer in the cruiser HMS Sussex, attached to the Royal Australian Navy, in July 1934 and, having been appointed a Member of the Royal Victorian Order on 21 November 1934, and promoted to captain on 31 December 1935, he became assistant director of plans at the Admiralty in June 1936. He went on to be captain (destroyers) of the 1st Destroyer Flotilla in the Mediterranean Fleet and commanding officer of the destroyer HMS Grenville in May 1938.

=== Second World War ===
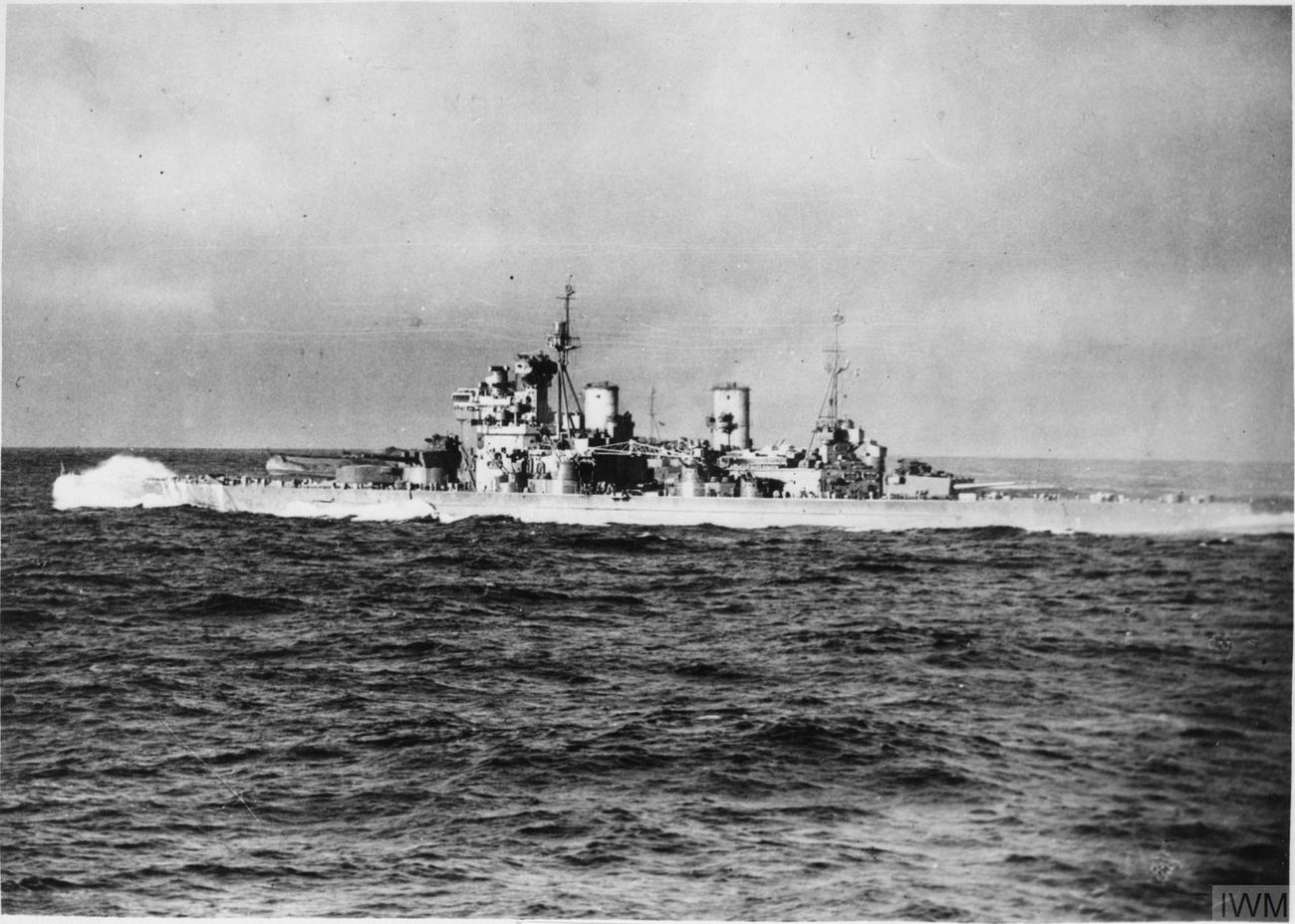
The battleship HMS Duke of York commanded by Creasy as flag captain to the commander-in-chief of the Home Fleet.

Creasy served in the Second World War, initially as commanding officer of HMS Grenville, which was sunk off Kentish Knock in January 1940. He then transferred to the destroyer HMS Codrington, in which he led the rescue of Juliana of the Netherlands in May 1940 and then took part in the Dunkirk evacuation later that month. He was awarded the Distinguished Service Order for his skill and initiative during these two operations on 11 July 1940. He became chief staff officer to the First Sea Lord in June 1940 and director of anti-submarine warfare in September 1940. He was appointed a Commander of the Dutch Order of Orange-Nassau (for rescuing the Crown Princess) on 12 May 1942, and became flag captain to the commander-in-chief of the Home Fleet in the battleship HMS Duke of York in September 1942.

Creasy was also appointed to the Polish Order of Polonia Restituta, Third Class, on 22 December 1942 and a Commander of the Order of the British Empire on 1 January 1943.

Promoted to rear admiral on 8 July 1943, Creasy went on to be chief staff officer to the naval commander-in-chief of the Allied Expeditionary Force in December 1943 and took part in the planning and execution of Operation Neptune, the naval operations for the Normandy landings in June 1944. Appointed a Companion of the Order of the Bath, for his role in the landings, on 25 July 1944, he became Flag Officer Submarines in October 1944 and, after a tour of the Far East, took responsibility for receiving surrendered enemy submarines into British ports at the end of the War. He was also appointed a Commander of the American Legion of Merit on 28 May 1946.

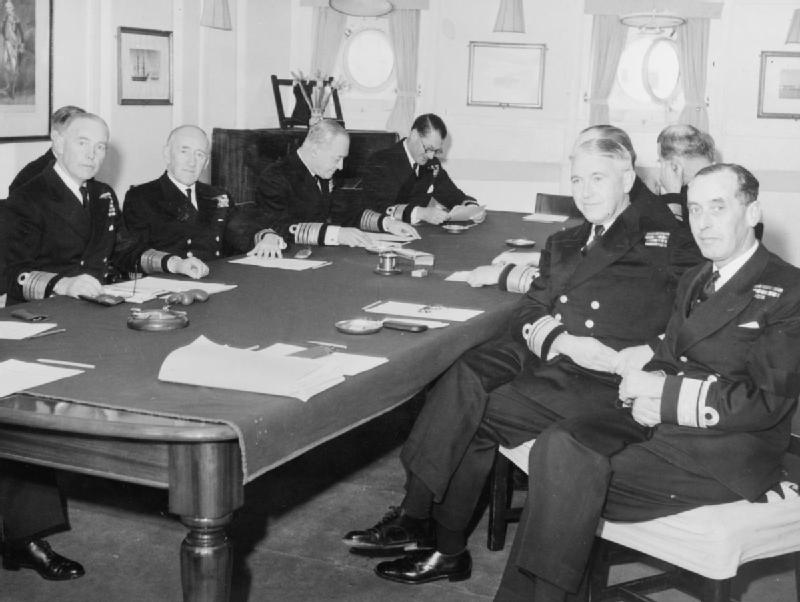
Admiral Creasy, third from left, at a conference with First Sea Lord Admiral Sir Rhoderick McGrigor and other admirals aboard HMS Liverpool, 1952

=== Later career ===
After the war Creasy was appointed Flag Officer (Air), Far East Fleet in February 1947 and, having been promoted to vice-admiral on 4 January 1948, he became Fifth Sea Lord and deputy chief of the Naval Staff (Air) in September 1948. Advanced to Knight Commander of the Order of the Bath on 1 January 1949, he went on to be Vice Chief of the Naval Staff in November 1949. Promoted to full admiral on 15 January 1951, he became commander-in-chief of the Home Fleet and Commander-in-Chief, Eastern Atlantic Area of the North Atlantic Treaty Organisation in January 1952, flying his flag first in the aircraft carrier HMS Indomitable and then in the battleship HMS Vanguard.

Creasey was advanced to Knight Grand Cross of the Order of the Bath on 1 June 1953 before becoming Commander-in-Chief, Portsmouth and NATO Allied Commander-in-Chief Channel Command in September 1954. He was promoted to Admiral of the Fleet on 22 April 1955 and then retired in 1957.

== Retirement and family ==
In 1924 Creasy married Monica Frances Ullathorne; they had a daughter and a son.

In retirement, Creasy became Deputy Lieutenant of Essex. He was also president of the Essex branch of the Royal British Legion and took an interest in fishing and shooting. He died at his home in Great Horkesley in Essex on 31 October 1972 and was buried in St. Peter and St. Paul's Churchyard at Little Horkesley.

== Sources ==
- Heathcote, Tony (2002). The British Admirals of the Fleet 1734 – 1995. Pen & Sword Ltd. ISBN 0-85052-835-6.

Military offices
Preceded by Claud Barry	Flag Officer Submarines; 1944–1946	Succeeded by Sir John Mansfield
Preceded by Sir Philip Vian	Fifth Sea Lord; 1948–1949	Succeeded by Sir Maurice Mansergh
Preceded by Sir John Edelsten	Vice Chief of the Naval Staff; 1949–1951	Succeeded by Sir Guy Grantham
Preceded by Sir Philip Vian	Commander-in-Chief, Home Fleet; 1952–1954	Succeeded by Sir Michael Denny
Preceded by Sir John Edelsten	Commander-in-Chief, Portsmouth; 1954–1957	Succeeded by Sir Guy Grantham
