= Hugh Sinclair =

British intelligence officer (1873–1939)

Admiral Sir Hugh Sinclair KCB
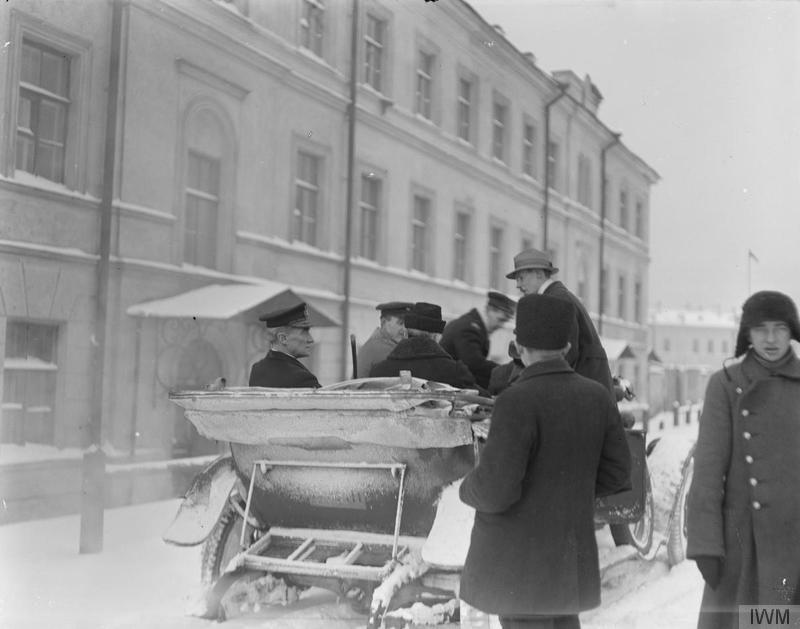
- Sinclair in a motor car in Tallinn

2nd Chief of the Secret Intelligence Service
- In office 1923 – 4 November 1939 †
- Preceded by: Mansfield Smith-Cumming
- Succeeded by: Stewart Menzies

Chief of the Submarine Service
- In office 1921–1923
- Preceded by: Douglas Dent
- Succeeded by: Wilmot Nicholson

Director of Naval Intelligence
- In office 1919–1921
- Preceded by: Reginald Hall
- Succeeded by: Maurice Swynfen Fitzmaurice

Personal details
- Born: 18 August 1873 Southampton, Hampshire, England
- Died: 4 November 1939 (aged 66) London, England
- Occupation: Intelligence officer
- Awards: KCB

Military service
- Allegiance: United Kingdom
- Branch/service: Royal Navy; Naval Intelligence Division; Secret Intelligence Service (SIS/MI6)
- Rank: Admiral
- Battles/wars: World War I; World War II

Admiral Sir Hugh Francis Paget Sinclair, KCB (18 August 1873 – 4 November 1939), known as Quex Sinclair, was a British intelligence officer. He was Director of British Naval Intelligence between 1919 and 1921, and he subsequently helped to set up the Secret Intelligence Service (SIS now commonly called MI6).

== Career ==
Sinclair was educated at Stubbington House School and joined the Royal Navy as a cadet aged 13 on 15 July 1886. He was promoted to lieutenant on 31 December 1894.

He entered the Naval Intelligence Division at the beginning of the First World War. He became Director of Naval Intelligence in February 1919 and Chief of the Submarine Service in 1921. He became the second director of SIS in 1923. He was promoted vice-admiral on 3 March 1926 and full admiral on 15 May 1930. Sinclair also founded Government Code and Cypher School in 1919.

Beginning in 1919 he attempted to absorb the counterintelligence service MI5 into the SIS to strengthen Britain's efforts against Bolshevism, an idea that was finally rejected in 1925. The SIS remained small and underfunded during the interwar years. By 1936, Sinclair realised that the Gestapo had penetrated several SIS stations and Claude Dansey, who had been removed from his station in Rome, set up Z Organization, intended to work independently of the compromised SIS.

In 1938, with a second war looming, Sinclair set up Section D, dedicated to sabotage. In spring 1938, using £6,000 of his own money, he bought Bletchley Park to be a wartime intelligence station.

Sinclair was asked in December 1938 to prepare a dossier on Adolf Hitler, for the attention of Lord Halifax, the Foreign Secretary, and Neville Chamberlain, the Prime Minister. In the dossier, which was received poorly by Sir George Mounsey, the Foreign Office assistant undersecretary, who believed that it did not gel with Britain's policy of appeasement, Sinclair described Hitler as possessing the characteristics of "fanaticism, mysticism, ruthlessness, cunning, vanity, moods of exaltation and depression, fits of bitter and self-righteous resentment; and what can only be termed a streak of madness; but with it all there is a great tenacity of purpose, which has often been combined with extraordinary clarity of vision".

Sinclair became seriously ill with cancer, causing Alexander Cadogan to note on 19 October 1939, that he was "going downhill". On 29 October, Sinclair underwent an operation for his cancer and died on 4 November 1939, aged 66, five days before the Venlo incident.

== Family ==
Hugh was the son of Admiral Frederick Beauchamp Paget Seymour, 1st Baron Alcester and Agnes Sinclair. In his will, Lord Alcester left the balance of his estate to Agnes Sinclair for her lifetime. On her death, two fifths were left to Frederick Charles Horace Sinclair and one fifth each to Hugh Francis Paget Sinclair, Claude Hamilton Sinclair and Evelyn Beauchamp Sinclair.

In 1907 Hugh married Gertrude Attenborough; they had two sons. They were divorced in 1920.

== Awards and decorations ==
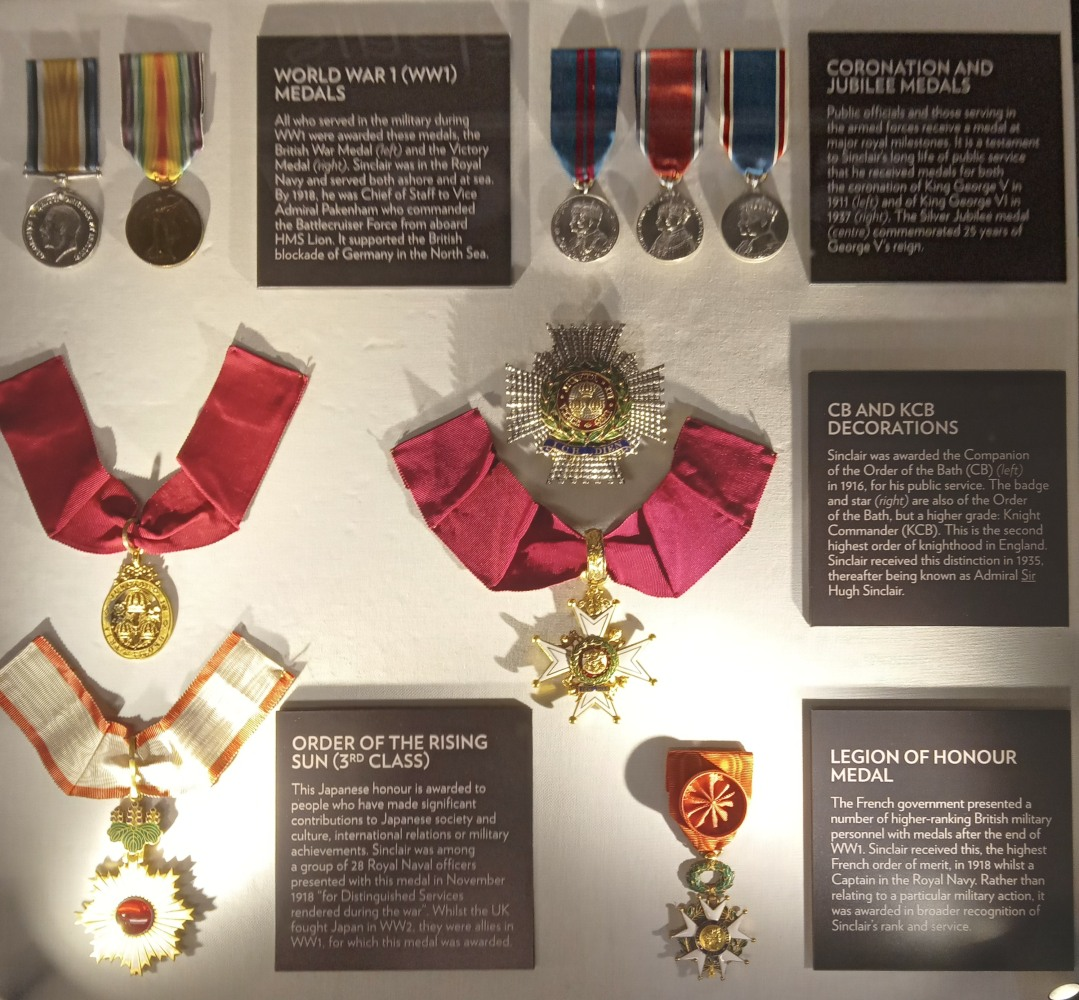
Medals of Sir Hugh Sinclair on display at Bletchley Park

- 1911 King George V Coronation Medal
- 1916 Companion of the Order of the Bath
- 1918 3rd Class, Order of the Rising Sun
- 1918 Officer, the Legion of Honour
- 1935 Knight Commander, the Order of the Bath
- 1937 King George VI Coronation Medal

Military offices
Preceded by William Hall	Director of Naval Intelligence; 1919–1921	Succeeded by Maurice Fitzmaurice
Preceded by Douglas Dent	Chief of the Submarine Service; 1921–1923	Succeeded by Wilmot Nicholson
Government offices
Preceded by Sir Mansfield Cumming	Chief of the SIS; 1923–1939	Succeeded by Stewart Menzies
