= HMS Tantalus =

Submarine of the Royal Navy

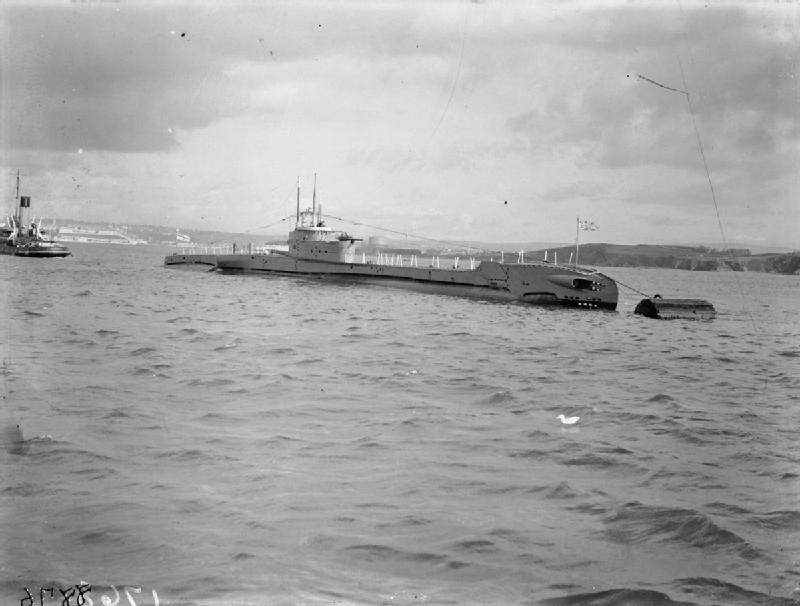
- HMS Tantalus in Plymouth Sound in August 1948

History

United Kingdom
- Name: HMS Tantalus
- Builder: Vickers-Armstrongs, Barrow
- Laid down: 6 June 1942
- Launched: 24 February 1943
- Commissioned: 2 June 1943
- Identification: Pennant number P318
- Fate: Scrapped in November 1950
- Badge

General characteristics
- Class & type: British T class submarine
- Displacement: 1,290 tons surfaced; 1,560 tons submerged
- Length: 276 ft 6 in (84.28 m)
- Beam: 25 ft 6 in (7.77 m)
- Draught: 12 ft 9 in (3.89 m) forward; 14 ft 7 in (4.45 m) aft
- Propulsion: Two shafts; Twin diesel engines 2,500 hp (1.86 MW) each; Twin electric motors 1,450 hp (1.08 MW) each
- Speed: 15.5 knots (28.7 km/h) surfaced; nine knots (20 km/h) submerged
- Range: 4,500 nautical miles at 11 knots (8,330 km at 20 km/h) surfaced
- Test depth: 300 ft (91 m) max
- Complement: 61
- Armament: Six internal forward-facing 21-inch (533 mm) torpedo tubes; two external forward-facing torpedo tubes; two external amidships rear-facing torpedo tubes; one external rear-facing torpedo tubes; six reload torpedoes; 1 x 4-inch (102 mm) deck gun; three anti-aircraft machine guns

HMS Tantalus was a British submarine of the third group of the T class. She was built as P318 by Vickers-Armstrongs in Barrow, and launched on 24 February 1943. So far she has been the only ship of the Royal Navy to bear the name Tantalus, after the mythological figure Tantalus, the son of Zeus.

== Service ==
Tantalus served in the Far East for much of her wartime career. She sank the Malaysian tug Kampung Besar, and the Malaysian Pulo Salanama in April 1944. She went on to sink the Japanese army cargo ships Amagi Maru and Hiyoshi Maru, the Japanese cargo ship Hachijin Maru, the Japanese coaster Palang Maru, the Japanese fishing vessel Taisei Maru No. 12, a Japanese tug and three barges, an unknown Japanese vessel, and a Siamese sailing vessel, whilst claiming to have damaged a second. Tantalus also damaged a tug and the Japanese submarine chaser Ch 1. She also attacked, but missed the Japanese submarine I-166, which was sunk later that day by HMS Telemachus.

Tantalus survived the war and continued in service with the Royal Navy, finally being scrapped at Milford Haven in November 1950.
