= Guy Grantham =

Royal Navy Admiral (1900–1992)

Admiral Sir Guy Grantham GCB CBE DSO
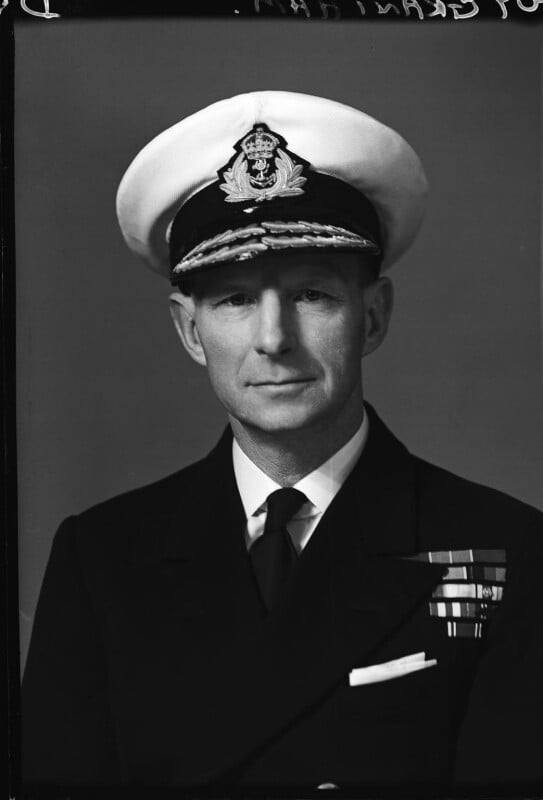
- Grantham in 1950
- Born: 9 January 1900; Skegness, Lincolnshire
- Died: 8 September 1992 (aged 92); Syston Park, Lincolnshire
- Military career
- Allegiance: United Kingdom
- Branch: Royal Navy
- Service years: 1918–1959
- Rank: Admiral
- Commands: Portsmouth Command (1957–59); Mediterranean Fleet (1954–57); Vice Chief of the Naval Staff (1951–54); Flag Officer Submarines (1948–50); HMS Indomitable (1943); HMS Cleopatra (1942); HMS Naiad (1941–42); HMS Phoebe (1940–41)
- Conflicts: First World War; Second World War
- Awards: Knight Grand Cross of the Order of the Bath; Commander of the Order of the British Empire; Distinguished Service Order; Mentioned in Despatches (2)

Admiral Sir Guy Grantham, GCB, CBE, DSO (9 January 1900 – 8 September 1992) was a senior Royal Navy officer who served as Commander-in-Chief, Portsmouth from 1957 to 1959.

== Naval career ==
Educated at Rugby School, Grantham joined the Royal Navy in 1918.

Grantham served in the Second World War, initially as commander of the cruiser HMS Phoebe and was involved in the evacuation from Greece, for which he was awarded the Distinguished Service Order. After a period as a liaison officer in the Western Desert, he became Commander of the cruiser HMS Naiad, which was sunk by a torpedo in March 1942. He then became commander of the cruiser HMS Cleopatra, in which he was involved in the defeat of the Italian Fleet at the second Battle of Birte. His last wartime command was of the aircraft carrier HMS Indomitable, which was involved in the landings in Sicily. He went on to be director of plans at the Admiralty.

After the war, Grantham became chief of staff to the commander-in-chief, Mediterranean Fleet in 1946. He was appointed flag officer submarines in 1948, flag officer, second in command of the Mediterranean Fleet in 1950 and Vice Chief of the Naval Staff in 1951. He became commander-in-chief, Mediterranean Fleet and NATO commander Allied Forces Mediterranean in 1954 and then Commander-in-Chief, Portsmouth and Allied commander-in-chief, Channel and southern North Sea in 1957. He retired in 1959.

Grantham was also First and Principal Naval Aide-de-camp to the Queen from 1958 to 1959.

In retirement Grantham became Governor and Commander-in-Chief Malta from 1959 to 1962.

== Family ==
In 1934 Grantham married Beryl Mackintosh-Walker; they went on to have two daughters.

Military offices
| Preceded by Sir John Mansfield | Flag Officer Submarines; 1948–1950 | Succeeded by Sydney Raw |
| Preceded by Sir George Creasy | Vice Chief of the Naval Staff; 1951–1954 | Succeeded by Sir William Davis |
| Preceded by Lord Mountbatten | Commander-in-Chief, Mediterranean Fleet; 1954–1957 | Succeeded by Sir Ralph Edwards |
| Preceded by Sir George Creasy | Commander-in-Chief, Portsmouth; 1957–1959 | Succeeded by Sir Manley Power |
Honorary titles
| Preceded by Sir Guy Russell | First and Principal Naval Aide-de-Camp; 1958–1959 | Succeeded by Sir William Davis |
Government offices
| Preceded by Sir Robert Laycock | Governor of Malta; 1959–1962 | Succeeded by Sir Maurice Dorman |
