= John Mansfield (Royal Navy officer) =

Vice-Admiral Sir John Mansfield KCB DSO DSC
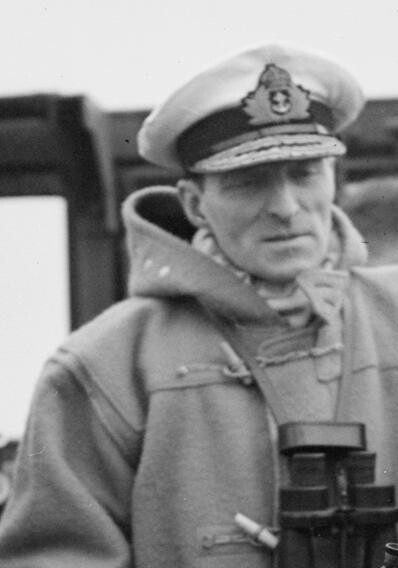
- John Mansfield on his flagship HMS Orion
- Born: 22 December 1893; Easthampstead, Berkshire
- Died: 4 February 1949 (aged 55); Lower Woodford, Wiltshire
- Military career
- Allegiance: United Kingdom
- Branch: Royal Navy
- Service years: 1906–1948
- Rank: Vice-Admiral
- Commands: HMS Norfolk; HMS Devonshire
- Conflicts: World War I World War II
- Awards: Knight Commander of the Order of the Bath; Distinguished Service Order; Distinguished Service Cross

Vice-Admiral Sir John Maurice Mansfield, KCB, DSO, DSC (22 December 1893 – 4 February 1949) was a Royal Navy officer who became Flag Officer Submarines.

== Naval career ==
Educated at the Royal Naval College, Osborne, and the Royal Naval College, Dartmouth, Mansfield joined the Royal Navy in 1906. After serving in the First World War, he became commanding officer of the cruiser HMS Norfolk in October 1937 and of the cruiser HMS Devonshire in May 1939. He saw action during the early stages of Second World War participating in the Norwegian campaign and evacuating the Norwegian royal family and Government officials from Tromsø, Norway, on 7 June 1940, two months after Germany had invaded. He went on to be Chief of Staff, Western Approaches in February 1941 and commander of the 15th Cruiser Squadron in January 1944, in which role he provided support for the landings at Anzio.

Mansfield became Assistant Chief of the Naval Staff for Trade in 1945 and Flag Officer Submarines in November 1946. He retired due to ill health in August 1948.

== Sources ==
- Bollinger, Martin (2010). Warriors and Wizards: The Development and Defeat of Radio-Controlled Glide Bombs of the Third Reich. Naval Institute Press. ISBN 978-1591140672.

Military offices
Preceded by George Creasy	Flag Officer Submarines; 1946–1948	Succeeded by Guy Grantham
