= HMS Severn (N57) =

Royal navy submarine

- HMS Severn (N57)

History

United Kingdom
- Name: HMS Severn
- Ordered: 1931
- Builder: Vickers Armstrong, Barrow
- Launched: 16 January 1934
- Decommissioned: 23 December 1944
- Out of service: 23 December 1944
- Fate: Sold for scrapping, 30 July 1946
- Badge

General characteristics
- Displacement: 2,206 tons surfaced; 2,723 tons submerged
- Length: 345 ft (105 m)
- Beam: 28 ft 3 in (8.61 m)
- Draught: 15.9 ft (4.8 m)
- Propulsion: 2 shaft diesel electric; 2 supercharged diesels 10,000 hp max; 2 electric motors 2500 hp
- Speed: 22 knots (41 km/h) surfaced; 10 knots (19 km/h) submerged
- Range: 12,000 nmi (22,000 km; 14,000 mi) at 12 kn (22 km/h; 14 mph) surfaced
- Complement: 61
- Sensors & processing systems: ASDIC
- Armament: 6 × 21 inch (533 mm) torpedo tubes (bow); 1 × 4 inch Mk XVI deck gun

HMS Severn (N57) was an ocean-going submarine of the River class. She was built by Vickers Armstrong, at Barrow, and launched on 16 January 1934. She was completed on 12 January 1935.

== Construction ==
At the time of launch, the River class were the fastest submarines afloat. They were powered by 10,000 hp diesel engines for surface operations and electric motors for submerged operations giving top speeds of 22.5 knots (41.7 km/h) and 10 knots (19 km/h) respectively. She carried a complement of 60 crew and was armed with a 4-inch (102 mm) gun, two machine guns and six torpedo tubes for 21 inch (533 mm) weapons. The tonnage of the Severn was 1,850 on surface and 2,710 when submerged. Like the rest of her classmates, Severn was of riveted construction, which was a significant limitation when it came to the safe diving depth: 300 feet (91 m) compared to the 500 feet (150 m) of the Odin-class.

== Service history ==
The outbreak of the Second World War found Severn in the Mediterranean with the 1st Submarine Flotilla stationed at Malta. In September 1939 she was transferred to West Africa, stationed at Freetown, to act as convoy escort guarding against surface raiders. She was on notice to take part in the hunt for the Graff Spee, but this notice was withdrawn following the Battle of the River Plate

In March 1940 Severn returned to home waters and was employed on interception patrols in the North Sea. This involved searching for U-boats, surface raiders and blockade runners, and she was active in this capacity during the Norwegian campaign. In May 1940, she sank the Swedish merchant Monark, which had been taken into German service.

In May 1941 Severn was reassigned to Gibraltar with the 8th Submarine Flotilla. During this period she made several patrols in the western Mediterranean, and she also sailed with HG 69 as ocean escort In June 1941 Severn fired upon an Italian Argonauta class submarine and later sank the Italian merchants Polinnia and Ugo Bassi. In August, she attacked an unidentified submarine.

She was one of a number of submarines ordered to track the German battleship Bismarck before her eventual sinking. Severn returned to Gibraltar upon the sinking of Bismarck.

In 1942 Severn returned to home waters, where she employed again on interception duties.

In May 1943 she returned to the Mediterranean to join the naval operations leading up to the invasion of Sicily (Operation Husky). Following this she was stationed at Haifa, and took part in relief operations to the garrison at Leros during the Aegean campaign.

In January 1944 Severn was assigned to the Eastern Fleet, joining 2nd Submarine Flotilla at Trincomalee in May. There she took part in interception patrols in the Indian Ocean.

== Disposal ==
VJ-Day found Severn in Ceylon, where she had been paid off and decommissioned on 23 December 1944. Having survived the Second World War, she was sold for breaking up in 1946 to T. Hassanally, of Bombay.
