= HMS Centurion (1911) =

King George V-class battleship

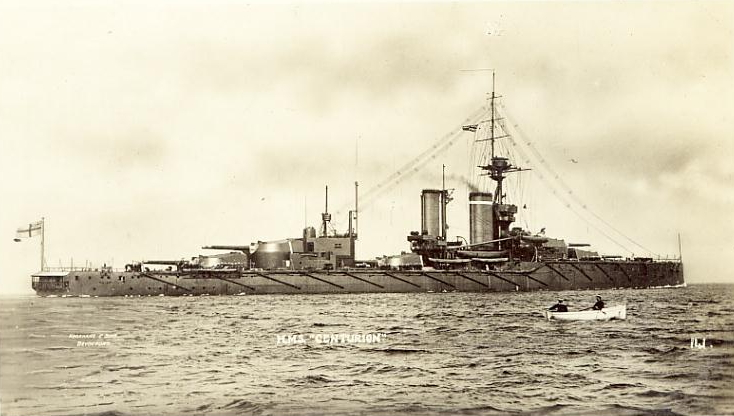
- A postcard of Centurion under way, about 1913

History

United Kingdom
- Name: Centurion
- Namesake: Roman centurion
- Builder: HM Dockyard, Devonport
- Laid down: 16 January 1911
- Launched: 18 November 1911
- Commissioned: 22 May 1913
- Decommissioned: 1924
- Reclassified: As a target ship, 1927
- Fate: Sunk as a Mulberry harbour blockship off Normandy, 7 June 1944

General characteristics (as built)
- Class & type: King George V-class dreadnought battleship
- Displacement: 25,420 long tons (25,830 t) (normal)
- Length: 597 ft 9 in (182.2 m) (o/a)
- Beam: 89 ft 1 in (27.2 m)
- Draught: 28 ft 8 in (8.7 m)
- Installed power: 27,000 shp (20,000 kW); 18 × Yarrow boilers
- Propulsion: 4 × shafts; 2 × steam turbine sets
- Speed: 21 knots (39 km/h; 24 mph)
- Range: 6,310 nmi (11,690 km; 7,260 mi) at 10 knots (19 km/h; 12 mph)
- Complement: 862 (1913)
- Armament: 5 × twin 13.5 in (343 mm) guns; 16 × single 4 in (102 mm) guns; 3 × 21 in (533 mm) torpedo tubes
- Armour: Belt: 12 in (305 mm); Deck: 1–4 in (25–102 mm); Turrets: 11 in (280 mm); Barbettes: 10 in (254 mm)

HMS Centurion was the second of four King George V-class dreadnought battleships built for the Royal Navy in the early 1910s. She spent the bulk of her career in the Home Fleet and the Grand Fleet. Aside from participating in the failed attempt to intercept the German ships in the Raid on Scarborough, Hartlepool and Whitby in late 1914 and the Battle of Jutland in May 1916, her service during the First World War generally consisted of routine patrols and training in the North Sea.

By the end of 1919, Centurion had been transferred to the Mediterranean Fleet. Although she spent much of her time in reserve, she had a peripheral role in the Allied intervention in the Russian Civil War. After her return home in 1924, the ship became the flagship of the Reserve Fleet. In 1926 Centurion was converted into a target ship and participated in trials evaluating the effectiveness of aerial bombing in addition to her normal duties. During the Second World War, the ship was rearmed with light weapons and was converted into a blockship in 1941. When that operation was cancelled, she was then modified into a decoy with dummy gun turrets to fool the Kriegsmarine and the Regia Marina. Centurion was sent to the Mediterranean in 1942 to escort Convoy MW 11 to Malta, although the Italians quickly saw through the deception. The ship was deliberately sunk during the Invasion of Normandy in 1944 to form a breakwater.

== Design and description ==
The King George V-class ships were designed as enlarged and improved versions of the preceding Orion-class battleship. They had an overall length of 597 feet 9 inches (182.2 m), a beam of 89 feet 1 inch (27.2 m) and a draught of 28 feet 8 inches (8.7 m). They displaced 25,420 long tons (25,830 t) at normal load and 27,120 long tons (27,560 t) at deep load. Centurion's crew numbered 862 officers and ratings upon completion.

Ships of the King George V class were powered by two sets of Parsons direct-drive steam turbines, each driving two shafts, using steam provided by 18 Yarrow boilers. The turbines were rated at 27,000 shaft horsepower (20,000 kW) and were intended to give the battleships a speed of 21 knots (39 km/h; 24 mph). During her sea trials on 19–20 February 1913, Centurion reached a maximum speed of 22.9 knots (42.4 km/h; 26.4 mph) from 34,530 shp (25,750 kW). She carried enough coal and fuel oil to give her a range of 6,310 nautical miles (11,690 km; 7,260 mi) at a cruising speed of 10 knots (19 km/h; 12 mph).

=== Armament and armour ===
Like the Orion class, the King George Vs were equipped with ten breech-loading (BL) 13.5-inch (343 mm) Mark V guns in five hydraulically powered twin-gun turrets, all on the centreline. The turrets were called 'A', 'B', 'Q', 'X' and 'Y', from front to rear. Their secondary armament consisted of sixteen BL 4-inch (102 mm) Mark VII guns. Eight of these were mounted in the forward superstructure, four in the aft superstructure, and four in casemates in the side of the hull abreast of the forward main gun turrets, all in single mounts. Four 3-pounder (47 mm (1.9 in)) saluting guns were also carried. The ships were equipped with three 21-inch (533 mm) submerged torpedo tubes, one on each broadside and another in the stern, for which 14 torpedoes were provided.

The King George V-class ships were protected by a waterline 12-inch (305 mm) armoured belt that extended between the end barbettes. Their decks ranged in thickness between 1 inch (25 mm) and 4 inches with the thickest portions protecting the steering gear in the stern. The main battery turret faces were 11 inches (279 mm) thick, and the turrets were supported by 10-inch-thick (254 mm) barbettes.

=== Modifications ===
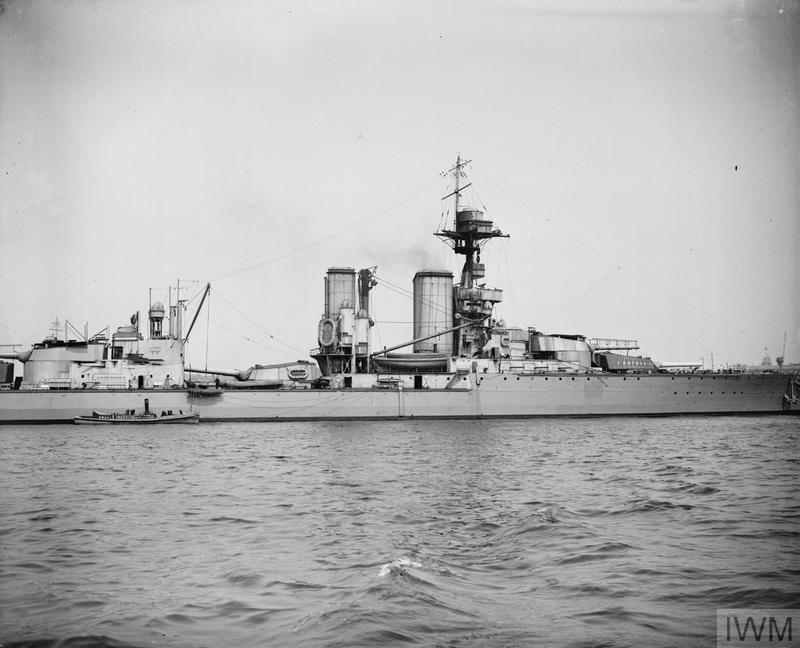
Close up of Centurion, June 1919; the flying-off platforms are visible on 'B' and 'X' turrets

A fire-control director was installed on the roof of the spotting top before August 1914; her original pole foremast was reinforced by short tripod legs to stiffen it and allow it to bear the weight of the director. By October 1914, a pair of three-inch (76 mm) anti-aircraft (AA) guns had been added on the quarterdeck. Approximately 80 long tons (81 t) of additional deck armour was added after the Battle of Jutland. By April 1917, the four-inch guns had been removed from the hull casemates as they were frequently unusable in heavy seas. The casemates were plated over and some of the compartments were used for accommodations. In addition, one of the three-inch AA guns was replaced by a four-inch AA gun. Her stern torpedo tube was removed in either 1917 or 1918 and flying-off platforms were fitted on the roofs of 'B' and 'X' turrets during 1918.

When Centurion was initially converted for use as a radio-controlled target ship for use by ships with guns up to 8 inches (203 mm) in diameter in 1926, the conversion was initially fairly minimal. All of her small fittings were removed, her boilers were converted to use diesel fuel instead of coal and numerous radio antennas were added for use by her controlling ship, the destroyer Shikari. The ship could steam at speeds of 16 knots (30 km/h; 18 mph) for three hours. Her gun turrets were removed shortly afterwards and some of the former coal bunkers were filled with rocks to compensate for weight of the turrets. This increased her draught to 31 feet 3 inches (9.5 m) which reduced the chances of steeply diving shells fired at maximum range penetrating beneath the armour belt. The ship was maintained by a crew of 242 who sailed her to the firing range and then disembarked. The spotting top was removed by 22 September 1930 and her forward superstructure was cut down and her funnels were shortened in 1933 in preparation for aircraft bombing trials.

Centurion was armed with a variety of weapons in June 1940 as the threat of German invasion increased and was then modified to serve as a repair ship for the local defence ships based in Devonport. In April–May 1941, she was converted into a blockship, with her magazines now serving as fuel tanks, but she was then modified with false gun turrets and masts to serve as a decoy for the battleship HMS Anson. Her armament now comprised two 2-pounder (40 mm) Mk II "pom-pom"s and eight 20-millimetre (0.8 in) Oerlikon light AA guns, all on single mounts. The ship's anti-aircraft armament was augmented in June 1942 with two additional "pom-pom"s and nine more Oerlikons.

== Construction and career ==
British and German ships saluting Kaiser Wilhelm II, Kiel, 24 June 1914; the four King George V-class ships are in the center background

Centurion, named after the Roman Army rank of centurion, was the sixth ship of her name to serve in the Royal Navy. She was laid down at HM Dockyard, Devonport on 16 January 1911 and launched on 18 November. While conducting her sea trials on the night of 9/10 December, Centurion accidentally rammed and sank the Italian steamer SS Derna with the loss of all hands. The battleship's bow was badly damaged and the ship was under repair until March 1913. She cost £1,950,671 at completion and was commissioned on 22 May, joining her sister ships in the 2nd Battle Squadron (BS). The ship was present with the 2nd BS to receive the President of France, Raymond Poincaré, at Spithead on 24 June. All four sisters represented the Royal Navy during the celebrations of the re-opening of the Kaiser Wilhelm Canal, held in conjunction with Kiel Week, in Kiel, Germany, in June 1914.

=== First World War ===
Between 17 and 20 July 1914, Centurion took part in a test mobilisation and fleet review as part of the British response to the July Crisis. Arriving in Portland on 25 July, she was ordered to proceed with the rest of the Home Fleet to Scapa Flow four days later to safeguard the fleet from a possible surprise attack by the Imperial German Navy. In August 1914, following the outbreak of the First World War, the Home Fleet was reorganised as the Grand Fleet, and placed under the command of Admiral Sir John Jellicoe. Repeated reports of submarines in Scapa Flow led Jellicoe to conclude that the defences there were inadequate and he ordered that the Grand Fleet be dispersed to other bases until the defences be reinforced. On 16 October the 2nd BS was sent to Loch na Keal on the western coast of Scotland. The squadron departed for gunnery practice off the northern coast of Ireland on the morning of 27 October and her sister Audacious struck a mine, laid a few days earlier by the German auxiliary minelayer SS Berlin. Thinking that the ship had been torpedoed by a submarine, the other dreadnoughts were ordered away from the area, while smaller ships rendered assistance. On the evening of 22 November 1914, the Grand Fleet conducted a fruitless sweep in the southern half of the North Sea; Centurion stood with the main body in support of Vice-Admiral David Beatty's 1st Battlecruiser Squadron. The fleet was back in port in Scapa Flow by 27 November.

==== Bombardment of Scarborough, Hartlepool, and Whitby ====
The Royal Navy's Room 40 had intercepted and decrypted German radio traffic containing plans for a German attack on Scarborough, Hartlepool and Whitby in mid-December using the four battlecruisers of Konteradmiral (Rear-Admiral) Franz von Hipper's I Scouting Group. The radio messages did not mention that the High Seas Fleet with fourteen dreadnoughts and eight pre-dreadnoughts would reinforce Hipper. The ships of both sides departed their bases on 15 December, with the British intending to ambush the German ships on their return voyage. They mustered the six dreadnoughts of the 2nd BS, including Centurion and her sisters Ajax and King George V, and stood with the main body in support of Beatty's four battlecruisers.

The screening forces of each side blundered into each other during the early morning darkness of 16 December in heavy weather. The Germans got the better of the initial exchange of fire, severely damaging several British destroyers, but von Ingenohl, commander of the High Seas Fleet, ordered his ships to turn away, concerned about the possibility of a massed attack by British destroyers in the dawn's light. A series of miscommunications and mistakes by the British allowed Hipper's ships to avoid an engagement with Beatty's forces.

==== 1915–1916 ====
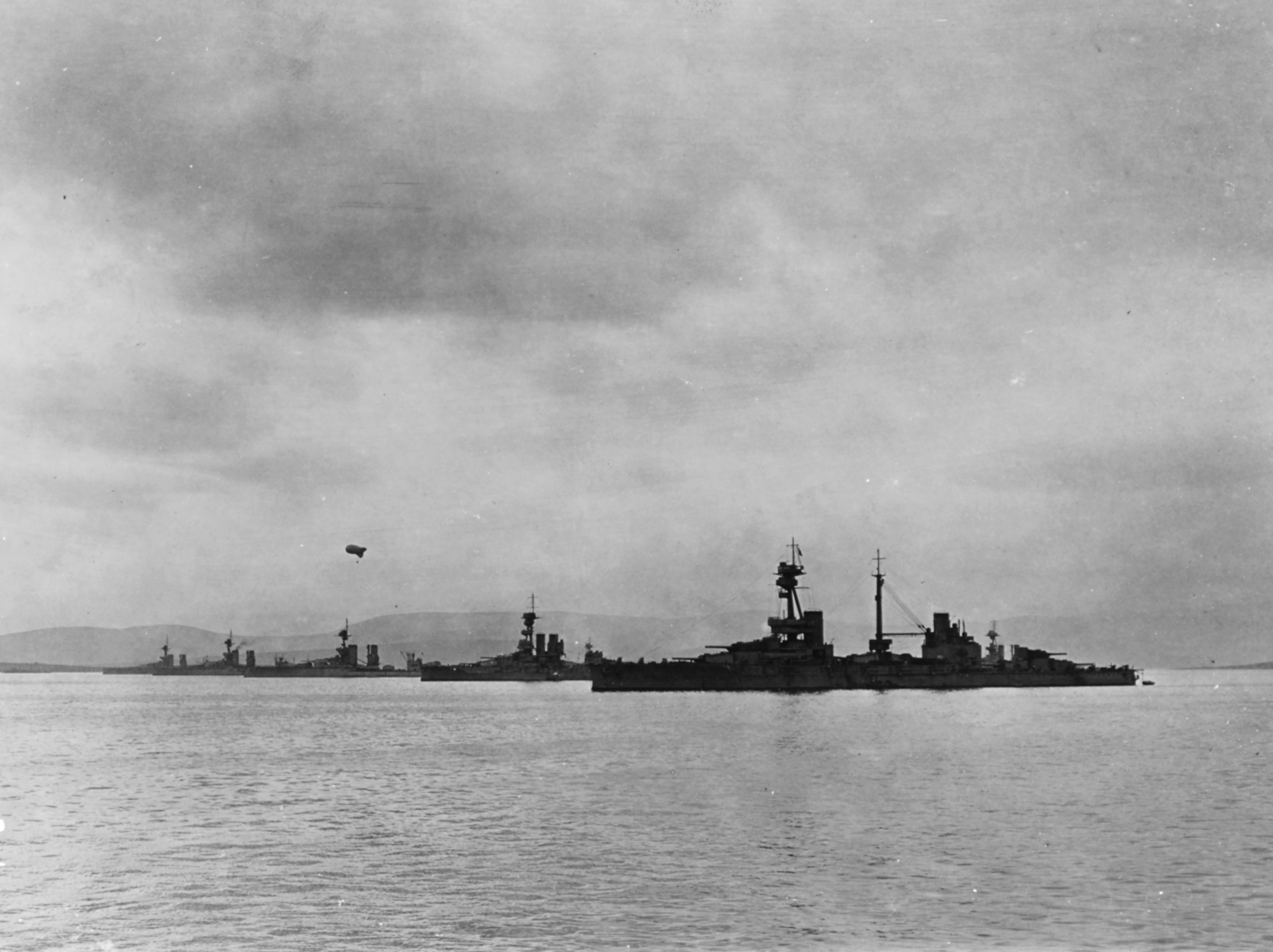
The 2nd Battle Squadron in Scapa Flow, 1918. Agincourt is nearest to the camera with Erin behind her. The other three are, in no order: King George V, Centurion and Ajax. Note the kite balloon over one of the more distant battleships.

Jellicoe's ships, including Centurion, conducted gunnery drills on 10–13 January 1915 west of Orkney and the Shetland Islands. On the evening of 23 January, the bulk of the Grand Fleet sailed in support of Beatty's battlecruisers, but Centurion and the rest of the fleet did not participate in the ensuing Battle of Dogger Bank the following day. The ship was refitted at Cromarty, Scotland, from 25 January to 22 February. On 7–10 March, the Grand Fleet conducted a sweep in the northern North Sea, during which it conducted training manoeuvres. Another such cruise took place on 16–19 March. On 11 April, the Grand Fleet conducted a patrol in the central North Sea and returned to port on 14 April; another patrol in the area took place on 17–19 April, followed by gunnery drills off Shetland on 20–21 April.

The Grand Fleet conducted sweeps into the central North Sea on 17–19 May and 29–31 May without encountering any German vessels. During 11–14 June, the fleet conducted gunnery practice and battle exercises west of Shetland and more training off Shetland beginning on 11 July. The 2nd BS conducted gunnery practice in the Moray Firth on 2 August and then returned to Scapa Flow. On 2–5 September, the fleet went on another cruise in the northern end of the North Sea and conducted gunnery drills. Throughout the rest of the month, the Grand Fleet conducted numerous training exercises. The ship, together with the majority of the Grand Fleet, conducted another sweep into the North Sea from 13 to 15 October. Almost three weeks later, Centurion participated in another fleet training operation west of Orkney during 2–5 November and repeated the exercise at the beginning of December.

The Grand Fleet sortied in response to an attack by German ships on British light forces near Dogger Bank on 10 February 1916, but it was recalled two days later when it became clear that no German ships larger than a destroyer were involved. The fleet departed for a cruise in the North Sea on 26 February; Jellicoe had intended to use the Harwich Force to sweep the Heligoland Bight, but bad weather prevented operations in the southern North Sea. As a result, the operation was confined to the northern end of the sea. Another sweep began on 6 March, but had to be abandoned the following day as the weather grew too severe for the escorting destroyers. On the night of 25 March, Centurion and the rest of the fleet sailed from Scapa Flow to support Beatty's battlecruisers and other light forces raiding the German Zeppelin base at Tondern. By the time the Grand Fleet approached the area on 26 March, the British and German forces had already disengaged and a strong gale threatened the light craft, so the fleet was ordered to return to base. On 21 April, the Grand Fleet conducted a demonstration off Horns Reef to distract the Germans while the Imperial Russian Navy relaid its defensive minefields in the Baltic Sea. The fleet returned to Scapa Flow on 24 April and refuelled before proceeding south in response to intelligence reports that the Germans were about to launch a raid on Lowestoft, but only arrived in the area after the Germans had withdrawn. On 2–4 May, the fleet conducted another demonstration off Horns Reef to keep German attention focused on the North Sea. It is uncertain if Centurion participated in this as she received a brief refit at Invergordon, Scotland, during the month.

==== Battle of Jutland ====
Maps showing the manoeuvres of the British (blue) and German (red) fleets on 31 May – 1 June 1916

In an attempt to lure out and destroy a portion of the Grand Fleet, the High Seas Fleet, composed of sixteen dreadnoughts, six pre-dreadnoughts and supporting ships, departed the Jade Bight early on the morning of 31 May. The fleet sailed in concert with Hipper's five battlecruisers. Room 40 had intercepted and decrypted German radio traffic containing plans of the operation. In response the Admiralty ordered the Grand Fleet, totalling some 28 dreadnoughts and 9 battlecruisers, to sortie the night before to cut off and destroy the High Seas Fleet.

On 31 May, Centurion, under the command of Captain Sir Michael Culme-Seymour, was the third ship from the head of the battle line after deployment. The ship was only lightly engaged at Jutland, firing four salvos (totalling 19 armour-piercing shells) at the battlecruiser SMS Lützow at 19:16 (Note: The times used in this section are in UT, which is one hour behind CET, which is often used in German works.) before Orion blocked Centurion's view, failing to hit her target.

==== Subsequent activity ====
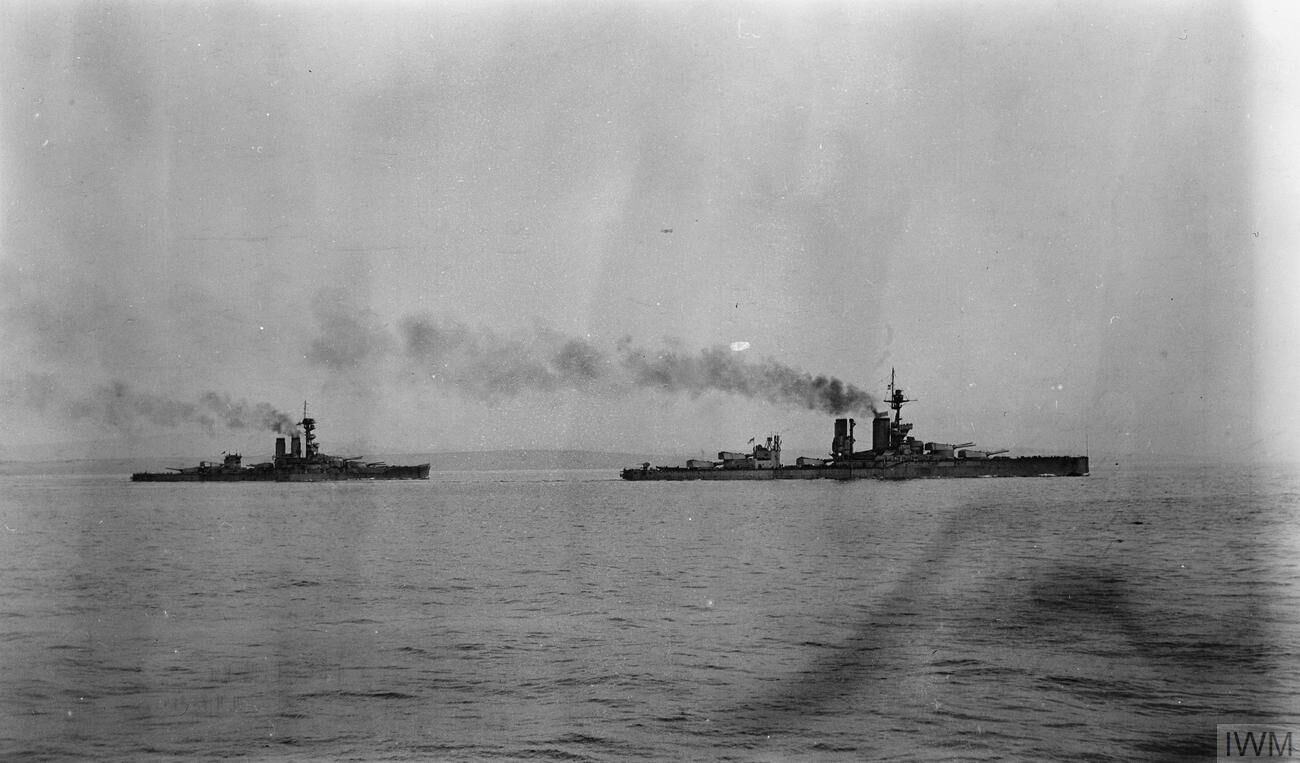
Erin (left) and Centurion conducting gunnery training in Scapa Flow, May 1917

Centurion was being refitted when the Grand Fleet sortied on 18 August to ambush the High Seas Fleet while it advanced into the southern North Sea, but a series of miscommunications and mistakes prevented Jellicoe from intercepting the German fleet before it returned to port. Two light cruisers were sunk by German U-boats during the operation, prompting Jellicoe to decide to not risk the major units of the fleet south of 55° 30' North due to the prevalence of German submarines and mines. The Admiralty concurred and stipulated that the Grand Fleet would not sortie unless the German fleet was attempting an invasion of Britain or there was a strong possibility it could be forced into an engagement under suitable conditions.

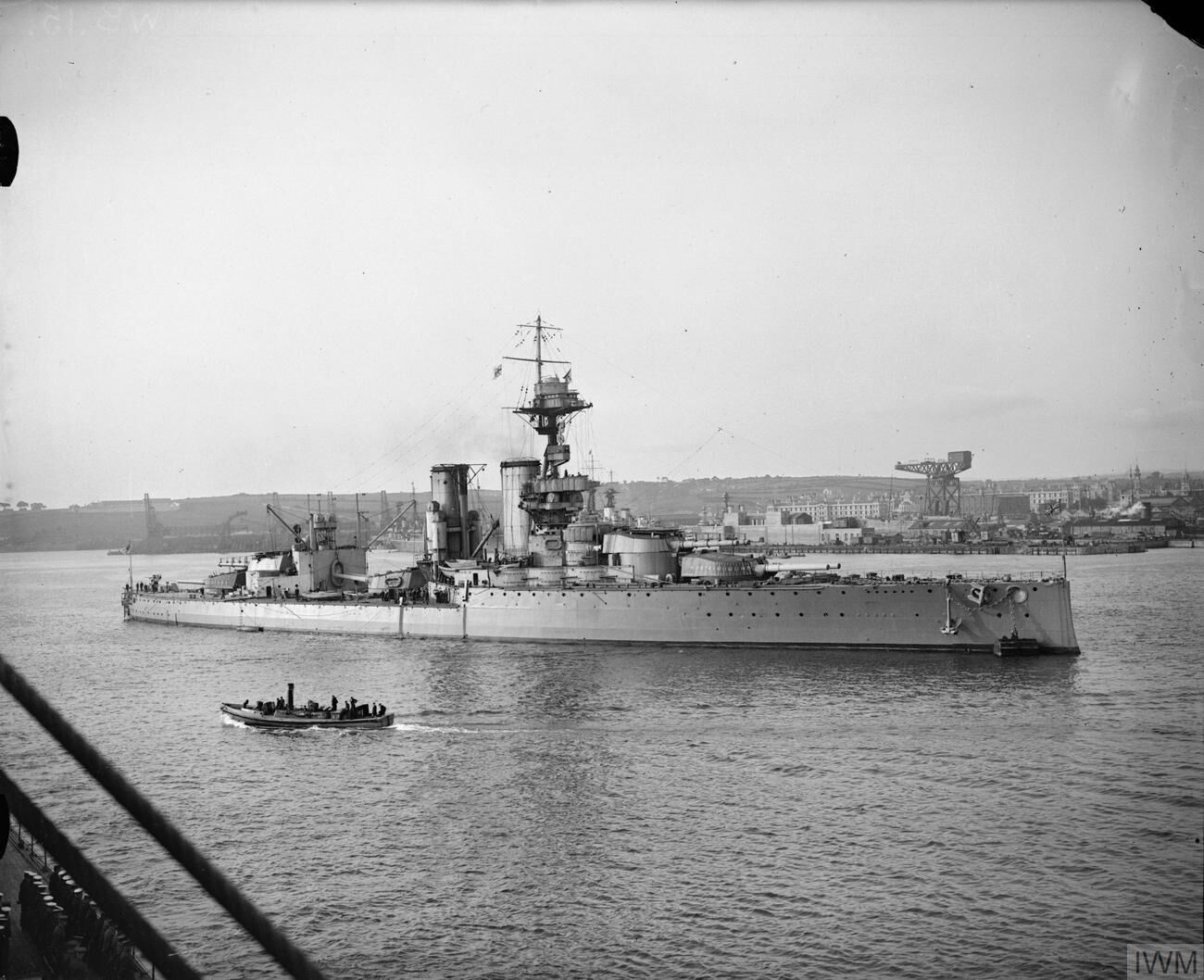
Centurion at Rosyth, Scotland, June 1919

In April 1918, the High Seas Fleet again sortied, to attack British convoys to Norway. They enforced strict wireless silence during the operation, which prevented Room 40 cryptanalysts from warning the new commander of the Grand Fleet, Admiral Beatty. The British only learned of the operation after an accident aboard the battlecruiser SMS Moltke forced her to break radio silence to inform the German commander of her condition. Beatty then ordered the Grand Fleet to sea to intercept the Germans, but he was not able to reach the High Seas Fleet before it turned back for Germany. The ship was present at Rosyth, Scotland, when the High Seas Fleet surrendered there on 21 November.

=== Between the wars ===
By 18 December 1919, Centurion had been assigned to the 4th Battle Squadron of the Mediterranean Fleet. In March 1920, the ship was temporarily placed in reserve, but was recommissioned on 8 August. During the Allied intervention in the Russian Civil War, Centurion participated in an exchange of prisoners of war with the victorious Bolsheviks in Georgia in October–November. After the destroyer Tobago struck a mine near Trebizond on 12 November, she was towed from Constantinople to Malta for permanent repairs by Centurion. In April 1921, the ship was again reduced to reserve, recommissioning on 1 August 1922 before the Chanak Crisis of September. Upon her return home in April 1924, she became the flagship of the Reserve Fleet at Portsmouth and participated in a fleet review in Torbay on 26 July. Centurion was transferred to Chatham Dockyard at the end of the year and remained there through 1925.

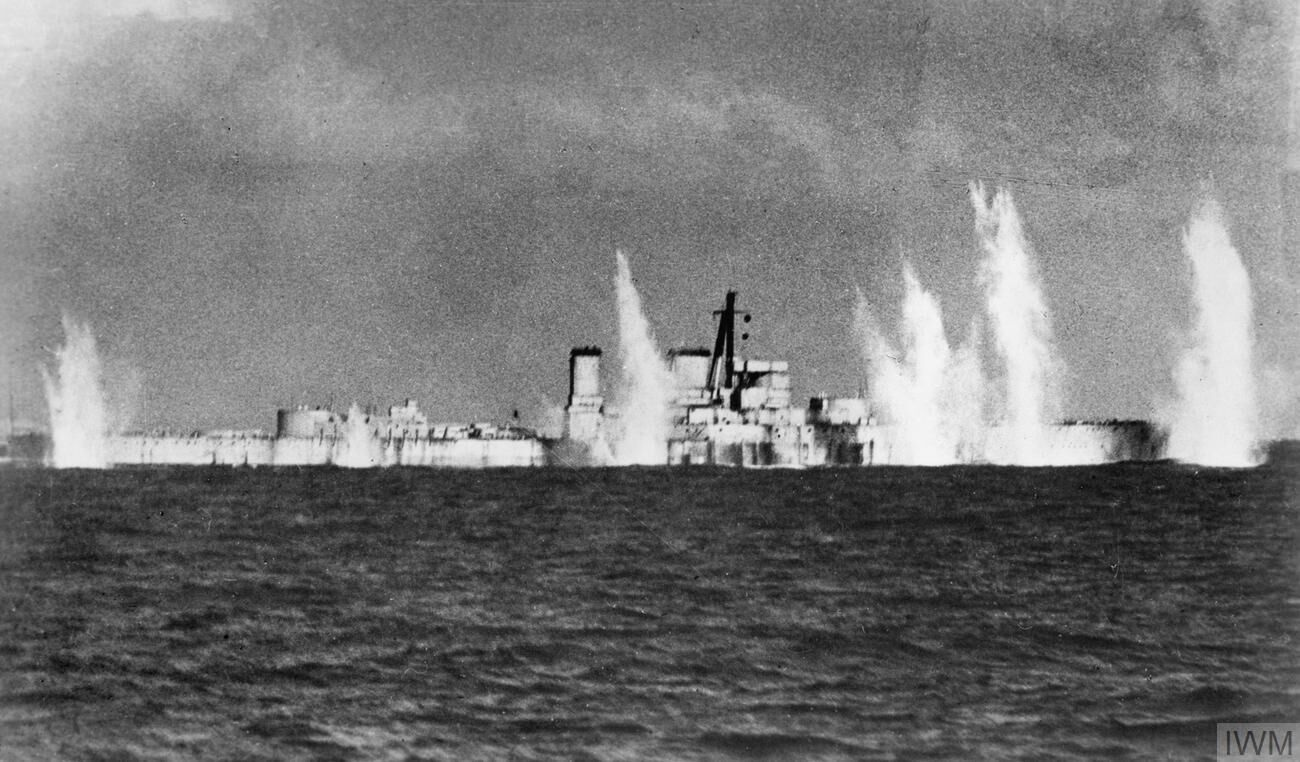
Centurion under fire as a target ship, 1934

In April 1926, the ship was chosen to replace the elderly semi-dreadnought Agamemnon as the fleet's radio-controlled target ship. The conversion, costing approximately £358,088, began on 14 April at Chatham Dockyard and lasted until July 1927 when she began sea trials. She was laid up in 1931 to cut costs and was decommissioned at Portsmouth on 30 January 1932. The ship was recommissioned in 1933 and was used by the Atlantic Fleet on 1 June. She was used in September for trials with dive bombers, which made 19 hits out of 48 bombs dropped; a much higher rate than level bombing from medium or high altitudes. Centurion was refitted between November 1934 – January 1935 to repair the damage inflicted by the fleet.

=== World War II ===
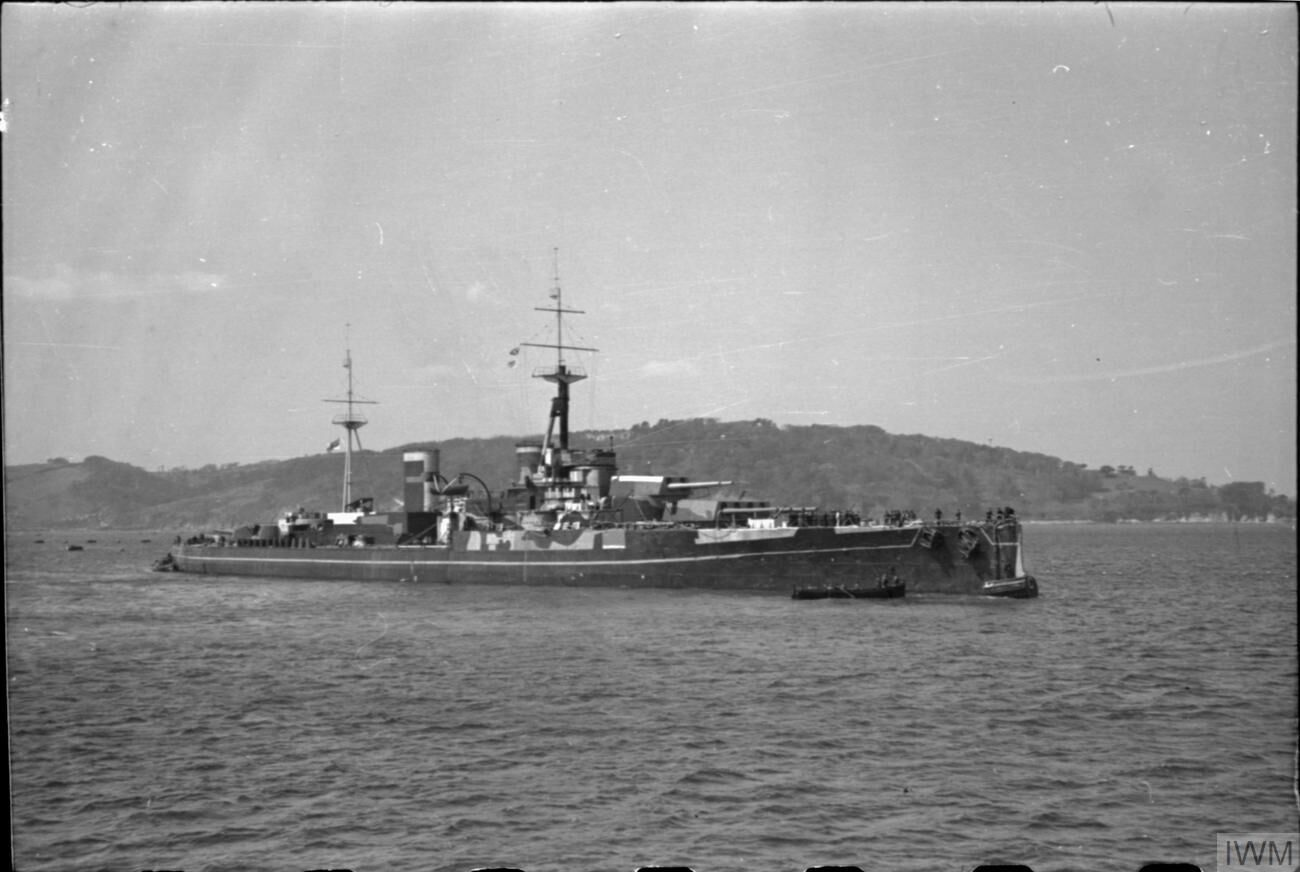
Centurion masquerading as Anson

In 1939–1940, the ship continued in her prewar role, although she was briefly considered for rearming in May 1940 as an anti-aircraft cruiser in support of the Norway campaign. She then served as a repair ship at Devonport before being converted into a blockship in April 1941. On 14 April, Winston Churchill suggested that a heavy naval bombardment of the Libyan city of Tripoli should be made by the Mediterranean Fleet and followed up by blocking the port with a battleship and the Admiralty suggested Barham and a cruiser, but Admiral Andrew Cunningham, commander of the Mediterranean Fleet, rejected the idea of using one of his active battleships and suggested Centurion instead. Upon further consideration, he assessed the chance of success as one in ten due to the difficulties of "wedging herself in exactly the right position within point blank range of the enemy guns with enemy dive bombers overhead." The ship was then modified to resemble the battleship Anson, then building at HM Dockyard, Portsmouth.

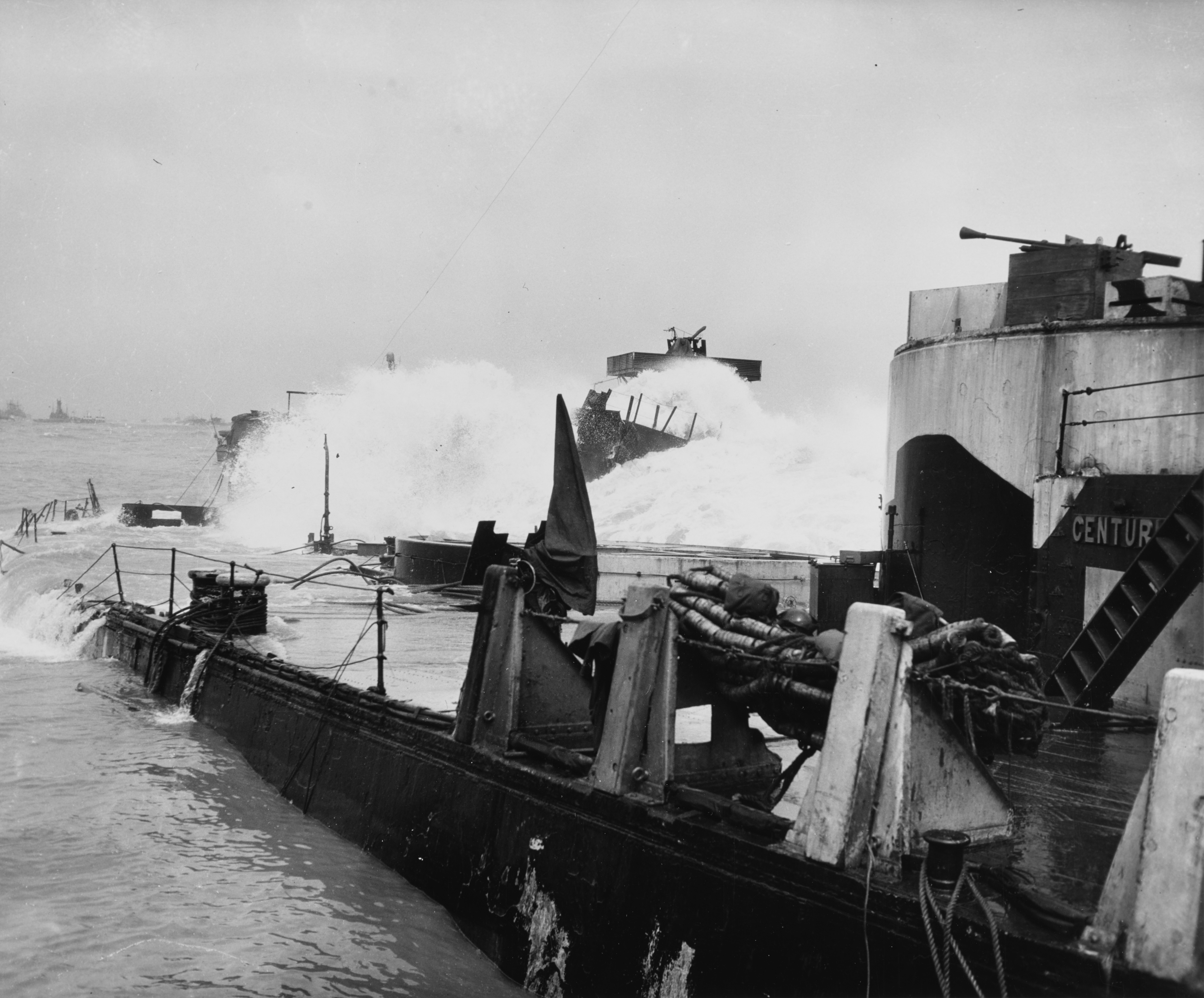
Centurion sunk as breakwater off Omaha Beach, June 1944

In 1942, Centurion was transferred to the Eastern Fleet and was detached to the Mediterranean Fleet in May–June to escort Convoy M.W. 11 from Alexandria to Malta in June as part of Operation Vigorous. She was assigned in the hopes of deceiving the Axis about the presence of an operational battleship; the Italians seem to have seen through the deception by the time the convoy sailed on 13 June, although the Germans were deceived. Two days later, the ship was slightly damaged by near misses when attacked by nine dive bombers; her Oerlikon cannon shot one of them down. Centurion was scuttled as a breakwater during the Invasion of Normandy off Omaha Beach on 9 June 1944 to protect a Mulberry harbour built to supply the forces ashore.

== Bibliography ==
- Admiralty Historical Section (2002). The Royal Navy and the Mediterranean. Whitehall histories, Naval Staff histories. Vol. II: November 1940–December 1941. Whitehall History in association with Frank Cass. ISBN 0-7146-5205-9.
- Admiralty Historical Section (2007). The Royal Navy and the Mediterranean Convoys: A Naval Staff History. Whitehall History Publishing in association with Routledge. ISBN 978-0-415-39095-8.
- Brooks, John (1996). "Percy Scott and the Director". In McLean, David; Preston, Antony (eds.). Warship 1996. Conway Maritime Press. pp. 150–170. ISBN 0-85177-685-X.
- Brown, David K. (2000). Nelson to Vanguard: Warship Design and Development 1923−1945. Chatham Publishing. ISBN 1-55750-492-X.
- Burt, R. A. (2012). British Battleships, 1919–1939 (2nd ed.). Naval Institute Press. ISBN 978-1-59114-052-8.
- Burt, R. A. (2012) [1986]. British Battleships of World War One (Revised ed.). Naval Institute Press. ISBN 978-1-59114-053-5.
- Campbell, N. J. M. (1986). Jutland: An Analysis of the Fighting. Naval Institute Press. ISBN 0-87021-324-5.
- Colledge, J. J.; Warlow, Ben (2006) [1969]. Ships of the Royal Navy: The Complete Record of All Fighting Ships of the Royal Navy from the 15th Century to the Present (3rd Rev ed.). London: Chatham Publishing. ISBN 978-1-86176-281-8. OCLC 67375475.
- Corbett, Julian (1997) [1940]. Naval Operations. History of the Great War: Based on Official Documents. Vol. III (Second ed.). Imperial War Museum in association with the Battery Press. ISBN 1-870423-50-X.
- Friedman, Norman (2015). The British Battleship 1906–1946. Seaforth Publishing. ISBN 978-1-84832-225-7.
- Goldrick, James (2015). Before Jutland: The Naval War in Northern European Waters, August 1914–February 1915. Naval Institute Press. ISBN 978-1-59114-349-9.
- Halpern, Paul G. (1995). A Naval History of World War I. Naval Institute Press. ISBN 1-55750-352-4.
- Hampshire, A. Cecil (1960). The Phantom Fleet. William Kimber & Co.
- Jellicoe, John (1919). The Grand Fleet, 1914–1916: Its Creation, Development, and Work. George H. Doran Company. OCLC 13614571.
- Lenton, H. T. (1998). British & Empire Warships of the Second World War. Naval Institute Press. ISBN 1-55750-048-7.
- Massie, Robert K. (2003). Castles of Steel: Britain, Germany, and the Winning of the Great War at Sea. Random House. ISBN 0-679-45671-6.
- Newbolt, Henry (1996) [1931]. Naval Operations. History of the Great War Based on Official Documents. Vol. V. Battery Press. ISBN 0-89839-255-1.
- Parkes, Oscar (1990) [1966]. British Battleships, Warrior 1860 to Vanguard 1950: A History of Design, Construction, and Armament (New & rev. ed.). Naval Institute Press. ISBN 1-55750-075-4.
- Preston, Antony (1985). "Great Britain and Empire Forces". In Gray, Randal (ed.). Conway's All the World's Fighting Ships 1906–1921. Naval Institute Press. pp. 1–104. ISBN 0-85177-245-5.
- Silverstone, Paul H. (1984). Directory of the World's Capital Ships. Hippocrene Books. ISBN 0-88254-979-0.
- Tarrant, V. E. (1999) [1995]. Jutland: The German Perspective: A New View of the Great Battle, 31 May 1916. Brockhampton Press. ISBN 1-86019-917-8.
