= HMS Seahorse (98S) =

S-class submarine

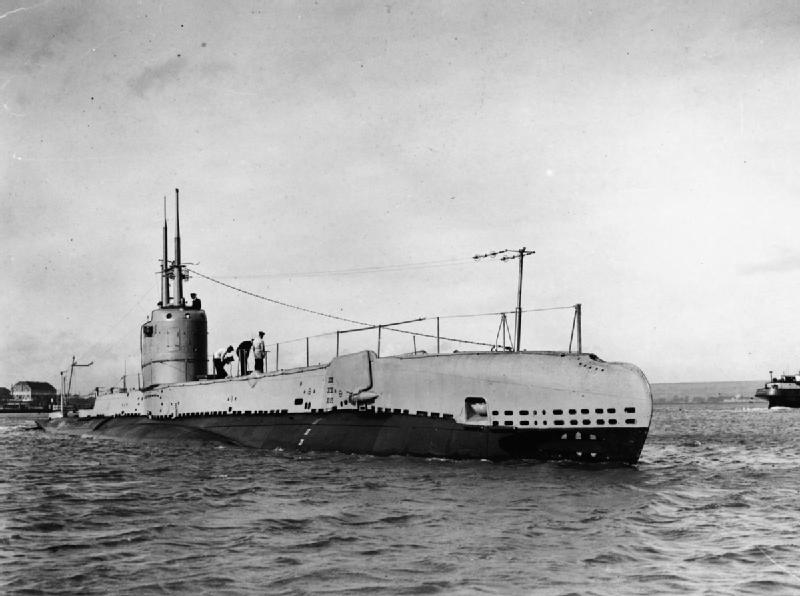
- Seahorse on the surface

History

United Kingdom
- Name: Seahorse
- Ordered: 16 March 1931
- Builder: Chatham Dockyard
- Laid down: 14 September 1931
- Launched: 15 November 1932
- Completed: 2 October 1933
- Identification: Pennant number: 98S
- Fate: Missing after 22 December 1939
- Badge

General characteristics
- Class & type: S-class submarine
- Displacement: 730 long tons (740 t) surfaced; 927 long tons (942 t) submerged
- Length: 202 ft 6 in (61.7 m)
- Beam: 24 ft (7.3 m)
- Draught: 11 ft 11 in (3.6 m)
- Installed power: 1,550 bhp (1,160 kW) (diesel); 1,300 hp (970 kW) (electric)
- Propulsion: 2 × diesel engines; 2 × electric motors
- Speed: 13.75 knots (25.47 km/h; 15.82 mph) surfaced; 10 knots (19 km/h; 12 mph) submerged
- Range: 3,700 nmi (6,900 km; 4,300 mi) at 10 knots (19 km/h; 12 mph) surface; 64 nmi (119 km; 74 mi) at 2 knots (3.7 km/h; 2.3 mph) submerged
- Test depth: 300 feet (91.4 m)
- Complement: 38
- Armament: 6 × bow 21 in (533 mm) torpedo tubes; 1 × 3-inch (76 mm) deck gun

HMS Seahorse was a first-batch S-class submarine (often called the Swordfish class) built for the Royal Navy during the 1930s. Ordered in March 1931, she was laid down at Chatham Dockyard in September 1931 and launched on 15 November 1932.

At the start of World War II, Seahorse was conducting a patrol southwest of Stavanger, Norway. While returning to port after her first and uneventful patrol, Seahorse was erroneously attacked with depth charges by a British aircraft. After repairs, she conducted a second war patrol, sighting the surfaced submarine U-36 on 13 November 1939. Her torpedoes missed their target, however. During her next patrol on 30 October, Seahorse sighted another German submarine, U-21, but it submerged before torpedoes could be launched. On 18 November, Seahorse spotted two German ships, very probably the destroyers Z21 Wilhelm Heidkamp and Z19 Hermann Künne, but failed to maneuver into an attack position. On 26 December, Seahorse departed for her sixth and last war patrol, off Heligoland Bight, with orders to patrol off Heligoland then shift to the mouth of the Elbe on 30 December, then return to port on 9 January 1940, but she did not return on her due date. It was originally thought that she had struck a mine, but German records, examined after the war, suggest she was sunk by the German First Minesweeper Flotilla, which reported an attack on an unidentified submarine on 7 January 1940. It is, however, also possible that she was rammed and sunk by the German Sperrbrecher IV/Oakland southeast of Heligoland on 29 December 1939.

== Design and description ==
The S-class submarines were designed as successors to the L class and were intended to operate in the North and Baltic Seas. The submarines had a length of 202 feet 6 inches (61.7 m) overall, a beam of 24 feet (7.3 m) and a mean draught of 11 feet 11 inches (3.6 m). They displaced 730 long tons (740 t) on the surface and 927 long tons (942 t) submerged. The S-class submarines had a crew of 38 officers and ratings. They had a diving depth of 300 feet (91.4 m).

For surface running, the boats were powered by two 775-brake-horsepower (578 kW) diesel engines, each driving one propeller shaft. When submerged each propeller was driven by a 650-horsepower (485 kW) electric motor. They could reach 13.75 knots (25.47 km/h; 15.82 mph) on the surface and 10 knots (19 km/h; 12 mph) underwater. On the surface, the first-batch boats had a range of 3,700 nautical miles (6,900 km; 4,300 mi) at 10 knots (19 km/h; 12 mph) and 64 nmi (119 km; 74 mi) at 2 knots (3.7 km/h; 2.3 mph) submerged.

The boats were armed with six 21-inch (533 mm) torpedo tubes in the bow. They carried six reload torpedoes for a grand total of a dozen torpedoes. They were also armed with a 3-inch (76 mm) deck gun.

== Construction and career ==
Ordered on 13 March 1931, HMS Seahorse was laid down on 14 September 1931 in Chatham Royal Dockyard and launched on 15 November 1932. The boat was commissioned the next year, on 2 October 1934, and received the pennant number 98S.

On 22 September 1938, Seahorse was damaged in an accidental collision with the destroyer HMS Foxhound.

=== World War II ===
At the onset of World War II, Seahorse was a member of the 2nd Submarine Flotilla. From 23–26 August 1939, the 2nd Submarine Flotilla transferred to its war base at Dundee. On 24 August, Seahorse, under the command of Lt. D.S. Massy-Dawson left Dundee, assigned to a patrol position southwest of Stavanger, Norway. At the start of World War II, this became her first war patrol. After her uneventful patrol, Seahorse, returning to Dundee, was erroneously attacked with depth charges by a British aircraft at 20:07 (UTC) in position 56°40′N 01°04′W. Seahorse had dived upon spotting the aircraft, but her diving planes jammed, causing her bow to come out of the water. Seahorse dived again and hit the 220 feet (67.1 m) deep bottom heavily, causing damage to her ASDIC dome. The attacking aircraft was heavily damaged by the blast of her own bombs and ditched. The next day, on 6 September, Seahorse ended her patrol in Dundee, then shifted to Rosyth for repairs later that day.

On 12 September, Seahorse returned to Dundee after repairs and left for her second war patrol on 16 September, again assigned to the southwest coast of Norway. The next day, Seahorse sighted the surfaced German U-boat U-36 which was attacking the Danish merchant ship N.J. Ohlsen. Three torpedoes were launched in position 56°42′N 00°52′E, but all missed their target. On 2 October, Seahorse ended her second war patrol in Dundee, and, after a stop at Rosyth, departed for her third patrol on 17 October. This time, Seahorse was ordered to patrol the southern coast of Norway. On 30 October 1939, Seahorse sighted a submarine, which may have been the German U-21, but the submarine dived before torpedoes could be fired. On 31 October, Seahorse returned to Rosyth, ending her third war patrol.

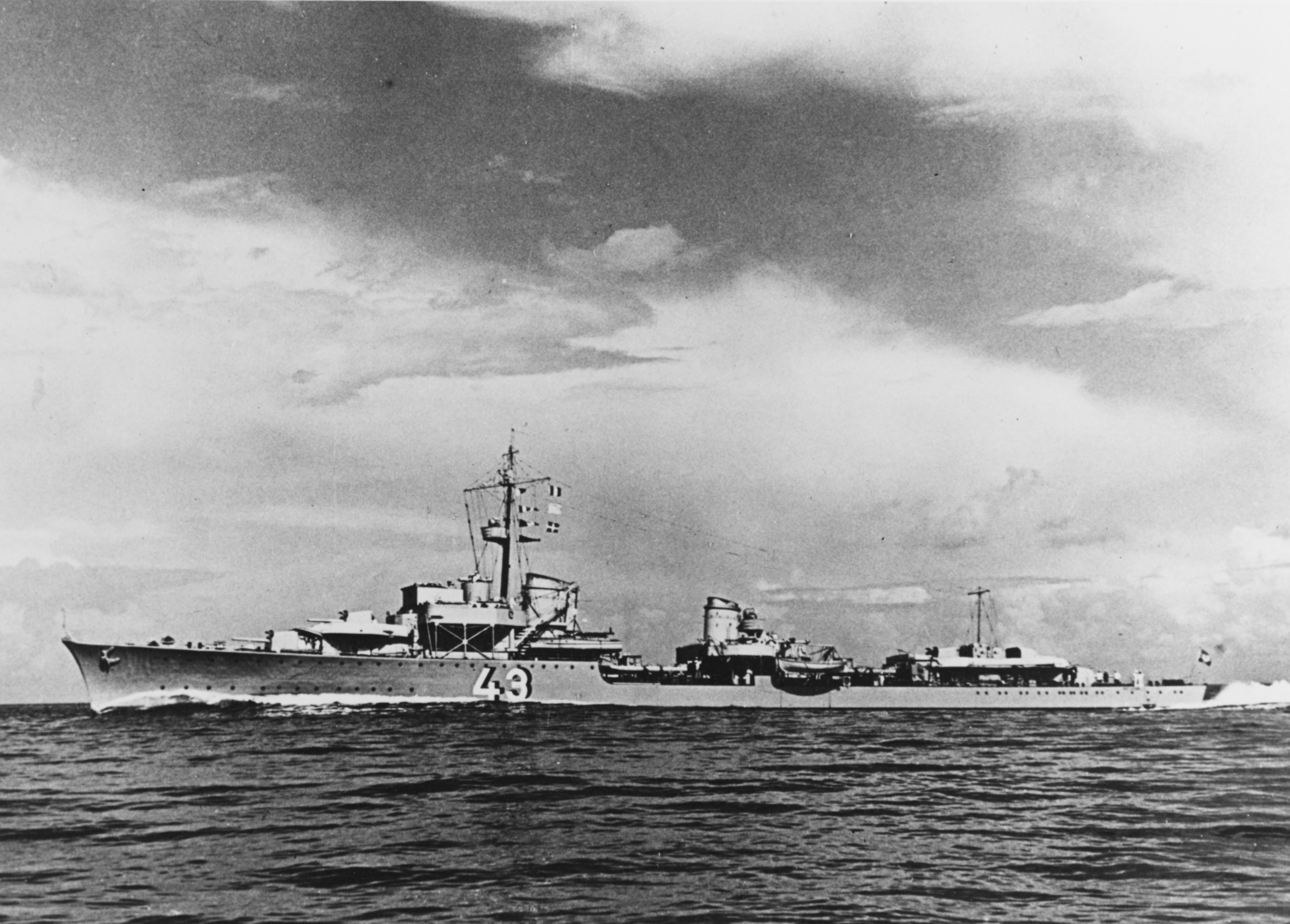
Z21 Wilhelm Heidkamp, which Seahorse attempted to attack on 18 November

After a stop at Blyth, Seahorse departed for her fourth war patrol on 12 November, to the northwest of the Netherlands. On 18 November, she sighted two ships, very probably the German destroyers Z21 Wilhelm Heidkamp and Z19 Hermann Künne, but Seahorse could not maneuver into an attack position. On 28 November, Seahorse returned to Blyth after her uneventful fourth patrol.

On 13 December, Seahorse departed Blyth to patrol the British east coast, but returned to port two days later after, having been recalled.

=== Last patrol ===
On 26 December, Seahorse departed for her sixth and last war patrol, off Heligoland Bight. Her orders were to initially patrol off Heligoland and then move to the mouth of the Elbe on 30 December. She was expected to return to Blyth on 9 January. Initially it was assumed that she was likely to have been mined but after the end of the war after examining German records it was considered possible that she could have been sunk by the German First Minesweeper Flotilla which reported carrying out a prolonged depth charge attack on an unknown submarine on 7 January 1940. It is however also possible that she was rammed and sunk by the German Sperrbrecher IV/Oakland southeast of Heligoland on 29 December 1939. Seahorse was the first British submarine lost to enemy action during World War II.
