= List of admirals who have hoisted their flag aboard HMS Victory =

List of admirals who have hoisted their flag aboard HMS Victory is a stand-alone list of admirals who have flown their flag from HMS Victory, accompanied by their commanding officers. As Victory is still a commissioned ship of the Royal Navy that serves as the flagship to the First Sea Lord, it is recognised that the list cannot as yet be completed.

== At sea ==
HMS Victory is a 104-gun first-rate wooden sailing ship of the line. With 247 years of service as of 2025, she is the world's oldest naval vessel still in commission. (Note: USS Constitution is 30 years younger. She is often referred to as the "oldest commissioned warship still afloat" because she is maintained in sailing trim; Victory is kept in dry dock.) Partly because of her long service, she has been the flagship of many a British admiral, beginning with Augustus Keppel who hoisted his flag on 24 March 1778 during the American Revolutionary War. He had received the rank of full admiral the month previous on 29 January and boarded the ship at Portsmouth as the Commander-in-Chief of the Channel Fleet. Keppel commanded Victory in her first major action, when his fleet engaged the French at the First Battle of Ushant on 27 July. Keppel resigned his commission in February 1779 following a political row with his subordinate, Sir Hugh Palliser. Keppel was so infuriated by the affair that he refused to serve again and Sir Charles Hardy, at the age of 65, was brought out of retirement as the most suitable replacement, raising his flag in March 1779. He never had an opportunity to take her into battle, dying from a seizure on 19 May 1780.

Admirals who hoisted their flag aboard HMS Victory during her service at sea
Admiral	From	Until	1st Captain	2nd Captain	refs
Admiral Augustus Keppel	16 May 1778	18 March 1779	Rear-Admiral John Campbell	Captain Jonathan Faulknor	
Admiral Sir Charles Hardy	19 March 1779	18 May 1780	Rear-Admiral Richard Kempenfelt	Captain Henry Collins	
Admiral Francis Geary	24 May 1780	28 August 1780	Rear-Admiral Richard Kempenfelt	Captain S. W. Collins	
Rear-Admiral Francis William Drake	11 September 1780	29 December 1780	Captain S. W. Clayton	None	
Vice-Admiral Hyde Parker	20 March 1781	31 May 1781	Captain S. W. Clayton	None	
Commodore John Elliott	June 1781	August 1781	Captain John Howorth	None	
Rear-Admiral Richard Kempenfelt	10 September 1781	11 March 1782	Captain John Howorth	Captain Henry Cromwell (Note: Henry Duncan from 10 April 1782)	
Admiral Lord Howe	20 April 1782	14 November 1782	Captain John Levenson-Gower	Captain Henry Duncan (Note: Captain Roger Curtis from 19 October 1782 then Captain Thomas Byard from 17 January 1783.)	
Admiral Lord Howe	17 July 1790	August 1790	Sir Roger Curtis (Note: Curtis was knighted in 1782 for his actions in Great Siege of Gibraltar.)	None	
Vice-Admiral Lord Hood	August 1790	August 1791	Sir Hyde Parker	Captain John Knight	
Rear-Admiral Sir Hyde Parker	5 February 1793	6 May 1793	Captain John Knight	None	
Admiral Lord Hood	6 May 1793	15 December 1794	Rear-Admiral Sir Hyde Parker (Note: Captain J. N. Inglefield from 19 June 1794.)	Captain John Knight	
Rear-Admiral Robert Mann	8 July 1795	27 September 1795	Captain John Knight	None	
Vice-Admiral Robert Linzee	October 1795	November 1795	Captain John Knight	None	
Admiral Sir John Jervis	3 December 1795	30 March 1797	Captain Robert Calder	Captain George Grey	
Vice-Admiral Lord Nelson	18 May 1803	23 May 1803	Captain Samuel Sutton	None	
Vice-Admiral Lord Nelson	30 July 1803	19 August 1805	Captain George Murray	Captain Thomas Hardy	
Vice-Admiral Lord Nelson	14 September 1805	22 December 1805 (Note: Flying at half-mast from 22 October 1805.)	Captain Thomas Hardy	None	
Vice-Admiral Sir James Saumarez	18 March 1808	9 December 1808	Captain George Johnstone Hope (Note: Thomas Byam Martin from 1 September 1808 then Captain J. C. Searle from December 1808.)	Captain Philip Dumaresq	
Vice-Admiral Sir James Saumarez	8 April 1809	20 December 1809	Captain George Johnstone Hope	Captain Philip Dumaresq	
Vice-Admiral Sir James Saumarez	11 March 1810	3 December 1810	Captain Philip Dumaresq	None	
Rear-Admiral Sir Joseph Yorke	December 1810	March 1811	None	None	
Vice-Admiral Sir James Saumarez	2 April 1811	25 December 1811	Captain Philip Dumaresq	Captain Lewis Shepherd	
Vice-Admiral Sir James Saumarez	14 April 1812	15 October 1812	Captain Philip Dumeresq	None	

== Harbour service ==
Following inspection and repairs in January 1824, Victory was considered too weak for active service and suitable only for use as the Port admiral's flagship. She remained in that role at Portsmouth Harbour until April 1830. In 1831, a public outcry stopped an Admiralty order for the ageing ship to be broken up and she was instead reassigned as home to the Captain of Ordinary, whose responsibility was to look after all the ships that had been laid up. In 1832 however, she was recommissioned as flagship to the port admiral once more. The port admiral moved his flag to the 120-gun HMS Britannia in August 1836 and Victory was without a role until August 1837, when she became flagship to the Admiral Superintendent of the Dockyard. In 1847 Victory was the flagship to the Commander-in-Chief, Portsmouth but she was docked again in 1857 for further repairs and recoppering. She resumed her role on her return to service in 1858, but in 1869 the Commander-in-Chief's flag was transferred to the steam line of battle ship Duke of Wellington and Victory was designated her tender.

Admirals who hoisted their flag aboard HMS Victory while she was on harbour service at Portsmouth
Admiral	From	Until	Commanding Officer	refs
Admiral Sir George Martin	January 1824	April 1827	Captain Charles Inglis	
Admiral Robert Stopford	1 May 1827	30 April 1830	Captain George Elliot	
Admiral Sir Thomas Foley	6 October 1831	14 January 1833	Osborne Foley (Note: Osborne was nephew to Sir Thomas.) (Note: Captain Hyde Parker from 25 January 1832.)	
Rear-Admiral Sir Frederick Maitland	22 January 1833	28 January 1833	Captain Hyde Parker	
Admiral Thomas Williams	29 January 1833	31 August 1835	Captain Edward R. Williams (Note: Captain Thomas Searle from 1 August 1836.)	
Rear-Admiral Sir Frederick Maitland	25 August 1836	25 July 1837	Captain Thomas Searle	
Rear-Admiral Duncombe Pleydell-Bouverie	July 1837	August 1842	Captain Thomas Searle (Note: Captain Francis Erskine Loch from 6 October 1839 then Rear-Admiral William Henderson from 5 September 1841.)	
Rear-Admiral Hyde Parker	6 August 1842	12 June 1845	Captain William Henderson (Note: Captain George Moubray from 1 October 1844.)	
Admiral Sir Charles Rowley	13 June 1845	19 August 1845	Captain George Moubray	
Rear-Admiral James Richard Dacres	20 August 1845	5 September 1845	Captain George Moubray	
Rear-Admiral Hyde Parker	23 September 1845	5 June 1846	Captain George Moubray (Note: Captain John Pasco from 12 April 1846.)	
Admiral Sir Charles Ogle	6 June 1846	30 September 1848	Captain John Pasco (Note: Pasco was promoted to Rear-Admiral on 22 September 1846. He was replaced as Victory's captain by Captain Richard Augustus Yates on 2 October 1847, then Captain Augustus Milne from 1 December 1847, then Captain Charles Eden from 18 December 1847.)	
Admiral Sir Thomas Capel	1 October 1848	30 September 1851	Captain Charles Eden (Note: Captain Francis Price Blackwood from 13 November 1848.)	
Admiral Sir Thomas Briggs	1 October 1851	26 December 1852	Captain George Bohun Martin	
Vice Admiral Sir Thomas Cochrane	27 December 1852	31 December 1855	Captain John Shepherd (Note: Captain Sir Thomas Maitland, 11th Earl of Lauderdale from 1 October 1853, then Captain John C. D. Hay from 19 January 1854 and Captain George Thomas Gordon from 1 February 1855.)	
Vice Admiral Sir George Seymour	1 January 1856	1 March 1859	Captain George Thomas Gordon (Note: Captain James Robert Drummond from 1 March 1856, then Captain George Henry Seymour (son of Vice Admiral Sir George Seymour) from 21 August 1856.)	
Admiral Sir William Bowles	20 March 1859	19 March 1860	Captain Arthur Farquhar	
Vice Admiral Sir Henry Bruce	20 March 1860	19 December 1864	Captain Robert Coote	
Vice Admiral Sir Michael Seymour	20 December 1864	19 March 1866	Captain Francis Scott	
Vice Admiral Sir Thomas Pasley	20 March 1866	20 March 1869	Captain Francis Egerton (Note: Captain Frederick Seymour from 20 September 1867, then Captain George Bowyear from 20 December 1868.)	
Tender to HMS Duke of Wellington from 20 December 1869 until 1 September 1891
Admiral The Earl of Clanwilliam	1 August 1891	17 September 1894	Captain Robert Woodward (Note: Captain Henry Palliser from 20 September 1891, then Captain Henry Coey Kane from 20 March 1892 and Captain Wollaston Kerslake from 20 April 1894.)	
Admiral Sir Nowell Salmon VC	18 September 1894	31 August 1897	Captain Wollaston Kerslake (Note: Captain William May from 18 May 1897.)	
Admiral Sir Michael Culme-Seymour	1 September 1897	17 November 1900	Captain Francis Bridgeman	
Admiral Sir Charles Hotham	18 November 1900	30 September 1903	Captain Edward Jones	
Admiral Sir John Fisher	1 October 1903	18 March 1904	Captain Robert Arbuthnot	
The Port Admiral's flag moved to HMS Hercules and on 1 February 1905, to Firequeen
Admiral Sir Archibald Douglas	18 March 1905	1 March 1907	Captain Spencer Login (Note: Captain Richard Phillimore from 18 May 1905.)	
Admiral Sir Day Bosanquet	2 March 1907	17 March 1908	Captain Archibald Moore (Note: Captain William Baker-Baker from 1 September 1907.)	
Admiral Sir Arthur Fanshawe	18 March 1908	30 April 1910	Captain Edward Hyde Parker	
Admiral Sir Assheton Curzon-Howe	1 May 1910	17 March 1911	Captain John Hutchinson	
Admiral Sir Arthur Moore	18 March 1911	31 July 1912	Captain John Hutchinson (Note: Captain Edwyn Alexander-Sinclair from 1 May 1911.)	
Admiral of the Fleet Sir Hedworth Meux	1 August 1912	17 February 1916	Captain Edwyn Alexander-Sinclair (Note: Captain Richard Stapleton-Cotton from 1 September 1913.)	
Admiral The Hon Sir Stanley Colville	18 February 1916	17 April 1919	Captain Richard Stapleton-Cotton (Note: Captain Francis Marten from 18 August 1916, then Captain Thomas Goldie from 18 August 1917, Captain Francis Mitchell from 1 November 1917, and Captain Anselan Stirling from 1 November 1918.)	
Admiral Sir Cecil Burney	18 April 1919	17 June 1920	Captain Colin Mackenzie	
Admiral Hon Sir Somerset Gough-Calthorpe	18 June 1920	31 May 1923	Captain Colin Mackenzie (Note: Captain Fawcet Wray from 1 September 1920, then Captain Rudolf Burmester from 1 November 1920, Captain Colin Maclean from 1 April 1922.)	

== Dry dock ==
At the end of 1921, Victory was brought into Portsmouth Dockyard for a detailed inspection, where it was discovered that she had hogged so badly that the bow and stern had dropped by 457 millimetres (18 in) and 203 millimetres (8 in) respectively, and that the scarph joints of the keelson had opened up by more than an 25.5 millimetres (1 in). Concerns about her ability to remain afloat led to Victory being dry docked indefinitely. She was moved to No. 2 dock on 20 March 1922. The ship continued to fly the flag of the Commander-in-Chief, Portsmouth until the post was amalgamated with Commander-in-Chief, Plymouth in 1969, when she became flagship to the newly formed Commander-in-Chief, Naval Home Command. This position was merged with that of Second Sea Lord in 1994. He flew his flag aboard the ship until October 2012, when the distinct Commander-in-Chief posts were discontinued and full command responsibility was vested in the First Sea Lord, who has since flown his flag from her. In May 2025, The First Sea Lord, Sir Ben Key was suspended while an investigation into his behaviour was carried out. (Note: Key was subsequently dismissed on 2 July. The BBC reported that Key had violated the military's code of conduct by having an affair with a more junior female officer.) He was provisionally replaced by acting Chief of Naval Staff, Second Sea Lord Vice Admiral Sir Martin Connell. A new First Sea Lord, Sir Gwyn Jenkins was appointed on 27 May 2025. He is not an admiral but a general in the Royal Marines.

Admirals who hoisted their flag aboard HMS Victory after she was permanently dry-docked in March 1922
Admiral	From	Until	Commanding Officer	refs
Admiral Sir Sydney Fremantle	1 June 1923	1 April 1926	Colin Maclean (Note: Captain Gilbert Owen Stephenson from 1 September 1924.)	
Admiral Sir Osmond Brock	18 May 1926	30 April 1929	Captain Gilbert Owen Stephenson (Note: Captain Francis George Gillilan Chilton from 1 August 1926, then Lieutenant Thomas Albert Herriott from 1 September1927 and Lieutenant P. C. Organ from 1 September 1928.)	
Admiral of the Fleet Sir Roger Keyes	1 May 1929	17 June 1931	Lieutenant P. C. Organ (Note: Lieutenant H. F. Edwards from 1 May 1931.)	
Admiral Sir Arthur Waistell	18 June 1931	17 February 1934	Lieutenant H. F. Edwards (Note: Lieutenant J. C. Ackerman from 1 April 1933.)	
Admiral of the Fleet Sir John Kelly	18 February 1931	31 August 1936	Lieutenant J. C. Ackerman (Note: Lieutenant G. E. Williamson from 18 June 1935.)	
Admiral of the Fleet The Earl of Cork and Orrery	18 August 1937	30 June 1939	Lieutenant T. H. Coulter (Note: Lieutenant W. G. English from 1 August 1937.)	
Admiral Sir William James	1 July 1939	30 September 1942	Lieutenant W. G. English (Note: Commander A. Grant from 2 September 1939.)	
Admiral Sir Charles Little	1 October 1942	28 September 1945	Captain A. Grant	
Admiral Sir Geoffrey Layton	29 September 1945	29 June 1947	Commander W. J. Stride	
Admiral The Lord Fraser of North Cape	30 June 1947	21 July 1948	Commander W. J. Stride (Note: Lieutenant S. R. Williams from 17 January 1948.)	
Admiral of the Fleet Sir Algernon Willis	22 July 1948	17 October 1950	Lieutenant S. R. Williams (Note: Promoted to Lieutenant Commander on 19 April 1949.)	
Admiral of the Fleet Sir Arthur Power	18 October 1950	17 October 1952	Lieutenant H. A. Southcott	
Admiral Sir John Edelsten	18 October 1952	17 October 1954	Lieutenant H. A. Southcott	
Admiral of the Fleet Sir George Creasy	18 October 1954	17 July 1957	Lieutenant H. A. Southcott (Note: Lieutenant S. S. Noble from 18 April 1955.)	
Admiral Sir Guy Grantham	18 July 1957	17 July 1959	Lieutenant S. S. Noble (Note: Lieutenant Commander A. McLangley from 18 January 1958.)	
Admiral Sir Manley Power	18 July 1959	17 January 1962	Lieutenant Commander A. McLangley (Note: Lieutenant Commander V. H. Bracher from 18 January 1961.)	
Admiral Sir Alexander Bingley	18 January 1962	17 January 1963	Lieutenant Commander V. H. Bracher	
Admiral Sir Wilfrid Woods	18 January 1963	9 September 1965	Lieutenant Commander V. H. Bracher	
Admiral Sir Varyl Begg	10 September 1965	9 June 1966	Lieutenant Commander V. H. Bracher (Note: Lieutenant Commander C. W. Whittington from 1 October 1965.)	
Admiral Sir Frank Hopkins	10 June 1966	30 October 1967	Lieutenant Commander C. W. Whittington	
Admiral Sir John Frewen	31 October 1967	27 February 1970	Lieutenant Commander C. W. Whittington (Note: Lieutenant Commander W. E. Pearce from 14 June 1968.)	
Admiral Sir Horace Law	28 February 1970	28 February 1972	Lieutenant Commander W. E. Pearce (Note: Lieutenant Commander A. Hardy from 1 July 1970.)	
Admiral Sir Andrew Lewis	29 February 1972	29 June 1974	Lieutenant Commander A. Hardy (Note: Lieutenant Commander H. A. A. Twiddy from 1 July 1972.)	
Admiral Sir Derek Empson	30 June 1974	30 October 1975	Lieutenant Commander P. C. Whitlock	
Admiral Sir Terence Lewin	31 October 1975	30 October 1976	Lieutenant Commander P. C. Whitlock	
Admiral Sir David Williams	31 October 1976	30 October 1978	Lieutenant Commander P. C. Whitlock (Note: Lieutenant Commander J. A. Barker from 1 September 1978.)	
Admiral Sir Richard Clayton	31 October 1978	30 June 1981	Lieutenant Commander J. A. Barker	
Admiral Sir James Eberle	1 July 1981	31 December 1983	Lieutenant Commander J. A. Barker (Note: Lieutenant Commander C. P. Addis from 5 January 1982.)	
Admiral Sir Desmond Cassidi	1 January 1983	30 October 1984	Lieutenant Commander C. P. Addis	
Admiral Sir Peter Stanford	31 October 1984	30 October 1987	Lieutenant Commander C. P. Addis (Note: Lieutenant Commander L. McAjay from 7 January 1986.)	
Admiral Sir John "Sandy" Woodward	31 October 1987	30 October 1989	Lieutenant Commander L. McAjay (Note: Lieutenant Commander J. D. D. Whitehead from 31 October 1988.)	
Admiral Sir Jeremy Black	31 October 1989	30 March 1991	Lieutenant Commander J. D. D. Whitehead	
Admiral Sir John Kerr	31 March 1991	30 March 1993	Lieutenant Commander D. J. Harris	
Admiral Sir Michael Layard	31 March 1993	30 March 1994	Lieutenant Commander D. J. Harris	
Admiral Sir Michael Boyce	31 March 1994	30 March 1997	Lieutenant Commander M. Cheshire	
Admiral Sir John Brigstocke	31 March 1997	18 January 2000	Lieutenant Commander M. Cheshire (Note: Lieutenant Commander F. Nowosieiski from 1 April 1998.)	
Vice Admiral Sir Peter Spencer	19 January 2000	28 January 2003	Lieutenant Commander F. Nowosieiski	
Vice-Admiral Sir James Burnell-Nugent	29 January 2003	25 October 2005	Lieutenant Commander F. Nowosieiski	
Vice-Admiral Sir Adrian Johns	25 October 2005	15 July 2008	Lieutenant Commander F. Nowosieiski (Note: Lieutenant Commander J. Scivier from 11 March 2006.)	
Vice-Admiral Sir Alan Massey	15 July 2008	19 July 2010	Lieutenant Commander J. Scivier (Note: Lieutenant Commander D. J. Whild from 1 September 2008.)	
Vice-Admiral Sir Charles Montgomery	19 July 2010	9 October 2012	Lieutenant Commander D. J. Whild (Note: Lieutenant Commander R. J. Strathern from 16 December 2011.)	
Admiral Sir Mark Stanhope	9 October 2012	9 April 2013	Lieutenant Commander R. J. Strathern	
Admiral Sir George Zambellas	9 April 2013	8 April 2016	Lieutenant Commander R. J. Strathern	
Admiral Sir Philip Jones	8 April 2016	19 June 2019	Lieutenant Commander B. J. Smith	
Admiral Sir Tony Radakin	19 June 2019	8 November 2021	Lieutenant Commander B. J. Smith	
Admiral Sir Ben Key	8 November 2021	9 May 2025	Lieutenant Commander B. J. Smith (Note: Lieutenant Commander Steve Cass from 12 May 2025.)	
Vice-Admiral Sir Martin Connell	10 May 2025	26 May 2025	Lieutenant Commander Steve Cass	

== Sources ==
- Davies, J.D. "Hardy, Sir Charles, the younger". Oxford Dictionary of National Biography (online ed.). Oxford University Press. doi:10.1093/ref:odnb/12282. (Subscription, Wikipedia Library access or UK public library membership required.)
- Heathcote, Tony (2002). The British Admirals of the Fleet 1734 – 1995. Pen & Sword. ISBN 0-85052-835-6.
- Eastland, Jonathan; Ballantyne, Iain (2011). HMS Victory – First Rate 1765. Barnsley: Seaforth Publishing, Pen and Sword Books. ISBN 978-1-84832-094-9.
- Knight, Roger (2004). "Curtis, Sir Roger". Oxford Dictionary of National Biography (online ed.). Oxford University Press. doi:10.1093/ref:odnb/6961. (Subscription, Wikipedia Library access or UK public library membership required.)
- Laughton, Leonard George Carr; Lambert, Andrew (2004). "Howe, Sir Assheton Gore Curzon". Oxford Dictionary of National Biography (online ed.). Oxford University Press. doi:10.1093/ref:odnb/32681. (Subscription, Wikipedia Library access or UK public library membership required.)
- Lavery, Brian (2015). Nelson's Victory - 250 Years of War and Peace. London: Seaforth Publishing. ISBN 978-1-84832-232-5.
- Ruddock Mackay (23 September 2004). "Keppel, Augustus, Viscount Keppel". Oxford Dictionary of National Biography. Oxford University Press.
- McGowan, Alan (2003). HMS Victory: Her Construction, Career and Restoration. London: Caxton Editions. ISBN 1-84067-532-2.
- Wharton, William James Lloyd (1872). A Short History of H.M.S. Victory, gathered from various sources and compiled by Lieut. W. J. L. Wharton R. N. Together with a list of all Admirals and Captains who have served in her. London: Simpkin, Marshall & Co.
- Winfield, Rif (2010). First Rate: The Greatest Warships of the Age of Sail. Annapolis, Maryland: Naval Institute Press. ISBN 978-1-59114-264-5.
