= Sir John Walker =

Sir John Walker may refer to:

- Sir John Walker (RAF officer) (1936–2025), British air marshal
- Sir John Ernest Walker (born 1941), British chemist
- Sir John Walker (runner) (born 1952), New Zealand runner
