= Press Division (Royal Navy) =

- Active: 1940-1942
- Country: United Kingdom
- Allegiance: British Empire
- Branch: Royal Navy
- Type: Staff Division
- Part of: 1SL (1940—1942); V.C.N.S. (1940—1942)
- Garrison/HQ: Admiralty; Whitehall; London, Great Britain

The Press Division was a staff division of the Admiralty Naval Staff established during World War II (1940-1942) before being abolished. The staff division was administered by the Director of Press Division

== History ==
Media and publicity within the Royal Navy leading up to World War II was handled by a specific section as part of the Naval Intelligence Division. It was set up in 1937 and was administered by a single staff officer Commander, C. H. A Brooking. However, as it was a part of the intelligence organisation who failed to see the advantages of promotion of the naval service and in fact was dubbed the 'silent service'. The First Lord of the Admiralty Winston Churchill however was of the view that in order to influence American opinion and thus entice the Americans into the war to help Britain's cause he authorized the setting up of a specific press division to promote the navy's achievements in January 1940 it was in operation until 1942 before being was disbanded. In 1945 the Admiralty set up a new Department Naval Information in order to handle the dissemination of naval information to the press and media it was headed by the Chief of Naval Information.

The division was initially under the Vice Chief of the Naval Staff in regard to policy and supervised by the First Sea Lord.
