= Henry Hoghton =

Henry Hoghton may refer to:

- Sir Henry Hoghton, 5th Baronet (c.1678–1768), British politician
- Sir Henry Hoghton, 6th Baronet (1728–1795), British politician
- Sir Henry Hoghton, 7th Baronet (1768–1835), British politician

== See also ==
- Henry Houghton (disambiguation)
