= Admiral Eberle =

Admiral Eberle may refer to:

- Edward Walter Eberle (1864–1929), admiral in the U.S. Navy
- James Eberle (1927–2018), admiral in the British Royal Navy
