= James Carine =

Royal Navy officer

Rear Admiral James Carine
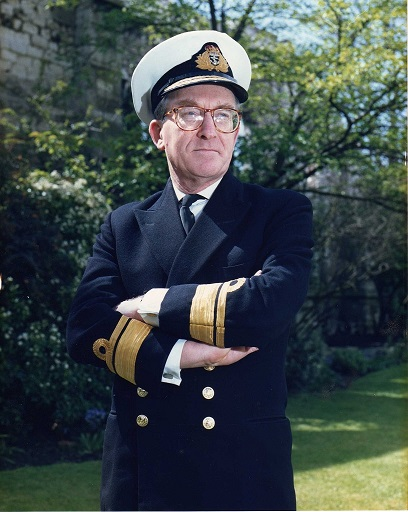
- Born: 14 September 1934; Castletown, Isle of Man
- Died: 27 January 2024 (aged 89); Chippenham, United Kingdom
- Military career
- Allegiance: United Kingdom
- Branch: Royal Navy
- Service years: 1950–1992
- Rank: Rear Admiral

Rear Admiral James Carine KSG FCIS (14 September 1934 – 27 January 2024) was a senior Royal Navy officer who served as Chief of Staff to Commander-in-Chief Naval Home Command (1989–1991).

== Early life ==
James Carine was born in Castletown, Isle of Man, on 14 September 1934, the eldest of three children to Mr. & Mrs. Amos Carine.

His father was a sailor, seeing service in the Merchant Navy with the Isle of Man Steam Packet Company as well as during the Second World War in which he was engaged in the Battle of the Atlantic. In addition his father served on the maiden voyage of the troopship Mauretania.

Carine lived his early years in Queen Street, Castletown, with the family later moving to King William's Road on the Janet's Corner Estate.

Attending Victoria Road Infants School, he subsequently passed his High School Entrance Exam and attended Douglas High School for Boys before, in September 1945, he won a Henry Bloom Noble Scholarship to attend King William's College as a day boy.

Sitting the theoretical part of his naval entrance examination in June 1949, Carine subsequently attended the Interview Panel in October 1950. Out of 238 applicants for the 27 vacancies available, he was one of 24 accepted.

== Naval career ==
Carine attended the Royal Naval College, Dartmouth. During his time at Dartmouth he was chosen as one of the cadets to represent the college at the coronation of Queen Elizabeth II on 2 June 1953, being posted on the route in Parliament Square. Following the Coronation, he was invited to dine with the Bishop of Lincoln.

Carine served on the Training Ship HMS Devonshire before joining the Bay Class Frigate HMS Enard Bay. Further postings saw him serve onboard the Submarine Depot Ships HMS Forth and HMS Ausonia; the Minotaur Class Cruiser HMS Superb; the Beachy Head Class Repair Ship HMS Girdle Ness; the Whitby Class Frigate HMS Scarborough; and the County Class Destroyer HMS Glamorgan. along with shore postings including Malta Dockyard, Singapore Naval Base, HMS Ganges (shore establishment) and RNAS Yeovilton (HMS Heron).

Senior shore postings saw him serve as Captain Executive Assistant to NATO Deputy Supreme Allied Commander Atlantic based in Norfolk, Virginia, and as Commodore in Command HMNB Devonport at the time of the 400th anniversary of the Spanish Armada at which he hosted a dinner for Queen Elizabeth II and Prince Philip, Duke of Edinburgh. During her visit, the Queen also added a stitch to the New World Tapestry, as did Carine and many other Naval personnel.

Promoted to the rank of Rear Admiral Carine served as Chief of Staff to Commander-in-Chief Naval Home Command at HMNB Portsmouth.

Carine retired from the Royal Navy in 1992.

== Post-Naval career ==
Following his retirement from the Royal Navy he joined the British Arab Horse Society as Manager and Registrar and was appointed Chairman of the International Stud Book Committee for the Arab Horse Breed. Contributing to the World Arabian Horse Organization and acting as Independent Chairman of the WAHO Stud Book Advisory Sub-committee and Independent Co-Chairman of the World Registrars Meeting, attending a number of conferences including in Bahrain (1998), Australia (2000), Turkey (2002), Poland (2004) and Syria (2007).

In 1988 he joined the Worshipful Company of Chartered Secretaries and Administrators as a Liveryman, admitted to the Court of Assistants in 1990, he was elected to be Master of the Livery Company in 1997/98. As part of his duties that year he led the company as part of the procession for the Lord Mayor's Show that year and hosted a dinner for the members onboard HMS Belfast.

Furthermore, also in 1988, Carine was awarded the Freedom of the City of London.

Retiring from the Arab Horse Society in 2000, he joined the Wiltshire Ambulance Service as Chairman, before its merger with Bath and Gloucestershire services to form Great Western Ambulance Service.

Carine then joined the management team of Royal United Hospital in 2006, Bath as Chairman. He also served as a Member of the National Copyright Tribunal; a Trustee of the Combat Stress Charity and a local welfare representative for BLESMA.

He was also a Fellow of the Chartered Governance Institute.

From 1997 to 2003 he was a member of the Board of Governors at Leweston School.

In 2012, Carine published a memoir titled 'Newspaper Round to Rear Admiral, Odyssey of a Castletown Boy', copies of which are available in Castletown Library and the Manx Museum.

== Personal life and death ==
In 1961 he married Sally. The marriage produced four children; one daughter and three sons.

In his retirement Carine was active in his hobbies of Dinghy racing and horse racing.

He was created a Knight of the Order of St. Gregory the Great by the then Pope John Paul II, Civil Division.

Carine died on 27 January 2024, at the age of 89. A private funeral was held on 15 February 2024 in Chippenham at St. Mary's Catholic Church.
