= List of First and Principal Naval Aides-de-Camp =

Below is a list of First and Principal Naval Aides-de-Camp, an office established by William IV of the United Kingdom in 1830.

== History of the office ==
In 1827 King George IV had appointed Lieutenant-General Sir Herbert Taylor (a senior Army officer and courtier) to be his First and Principal Aide-de-Camp ('an office which it is said was established expressly for the purpose of retaining the valuable services of Sir Herbert, who at that period was contemplating a continental journey'). Three years later King William IV appointed a number of Naval Aides-de-Camp to the King, and at the same time appointed Admiral Lord Amelius Beauclerk to be his First and Principal Naval Aide-de-Camp. Meanwhile Sir Herbert Taylor continued to hold the distinct office of First and Principal ADC, under both King William IV and Queen Victoria, until his death in 1839. He was not directly replaced; however, Beauclerk, following his death in December 1846, was promptly replaced in the office of First and Principal Naval ADC by Vice Admiral Sir William Parker, 1st Baronet, of Shenstone.

== First and Principal Naval Aides-de-Camp ==
- 1830–1846: Lord Amelius Beauclerk
- 1846–1866: Sir William Parker, 1st Baronet, of Shenstone
- 1866–1873: Thomas Maitland, 11th Earl of Lauderdale
- 1873–1878: Sir James Hope
- 1878–1879: Sir Henry Keppel
- 1879–1886: Sir Astley Key
- 1886–1895: Sir Geoffrey Hornby
- 1895–1897: Sir Algernon Lyons
- 1897–1899: Sir Nowell Salmon
- 1899–1901: Sir Michael Culme-Seymour, 3rd Baronet
- 1901–1902: Sir James Erskine
- 1902–1903: Sir Edward Seymour
- 1903–1904: Sir Henry Stephenson
- 1904–1911: Sir John Fisher
- 1911–1913: Sir Lewis Beaumont
- 1913–1914: Sir Edmund Poë
- 1914–1917: Sir George Callaghan
- 1917–1919: Sir Henry Jackson
- 1919–1922: Sir Stanley Colville
- 1922–1924: Sir Charles Madden, 1st Baronet
- 1924–1925: Sir Somerset Gough-Calthorpe
- 1925–1926: Sir Montague Browning
- 1926–1928: Sir Arthur Leveson
- 1928–1929: Sir Richard Phillimore
- 1929–1930: Sir William Goodenough
- 1930: Sir Edwyn Alexander-Sinclair
- 1930–1931: Sir Walter Cowan, 1st Baronet
- 1931–1932: Sir Hubert Brand
- 1932–1934: Sir Reginald Tyrwhitt, 1st Baronet
- 1934–1936: Sir John Kelly
- 1936–1938: William Boyle, 12th Earl of Cork and Orrery
- 1938–1939: Sir Roger Backhouse
- 1939–1941: Sir Reginald Drax
- 1941–1943: Sir Dudley Pound
- 1943–1945: Sir Percy Noble
- 1945–1946: John Tovey, 1st Baron Tovey
- 1946–1948: Bruce Fraser, 1st Baron Fraser of North Cape
- 1948–1949: Sir Henry Moore
- 1949–1952: Sir Arthur Power
- 1952–1953: Sir Rhoderick McGrigor
- 1953–1954: Sir John Edelsten
- 1954–1958: Sir Guy Russell
- 1958–1959: Sir Guy Grantham
- 1959–1960: Sir William Davis
- 1960–1962: Sir Caspar John
- 1962–1965: Sir Wilfrid Woods
- 1965–1968: Sir Desmond Dreyer
- 1968–1970: Sir John Frewen
- 1970–1972: Sir Horace Law
- 1972–1974: Sir Michael Pollock

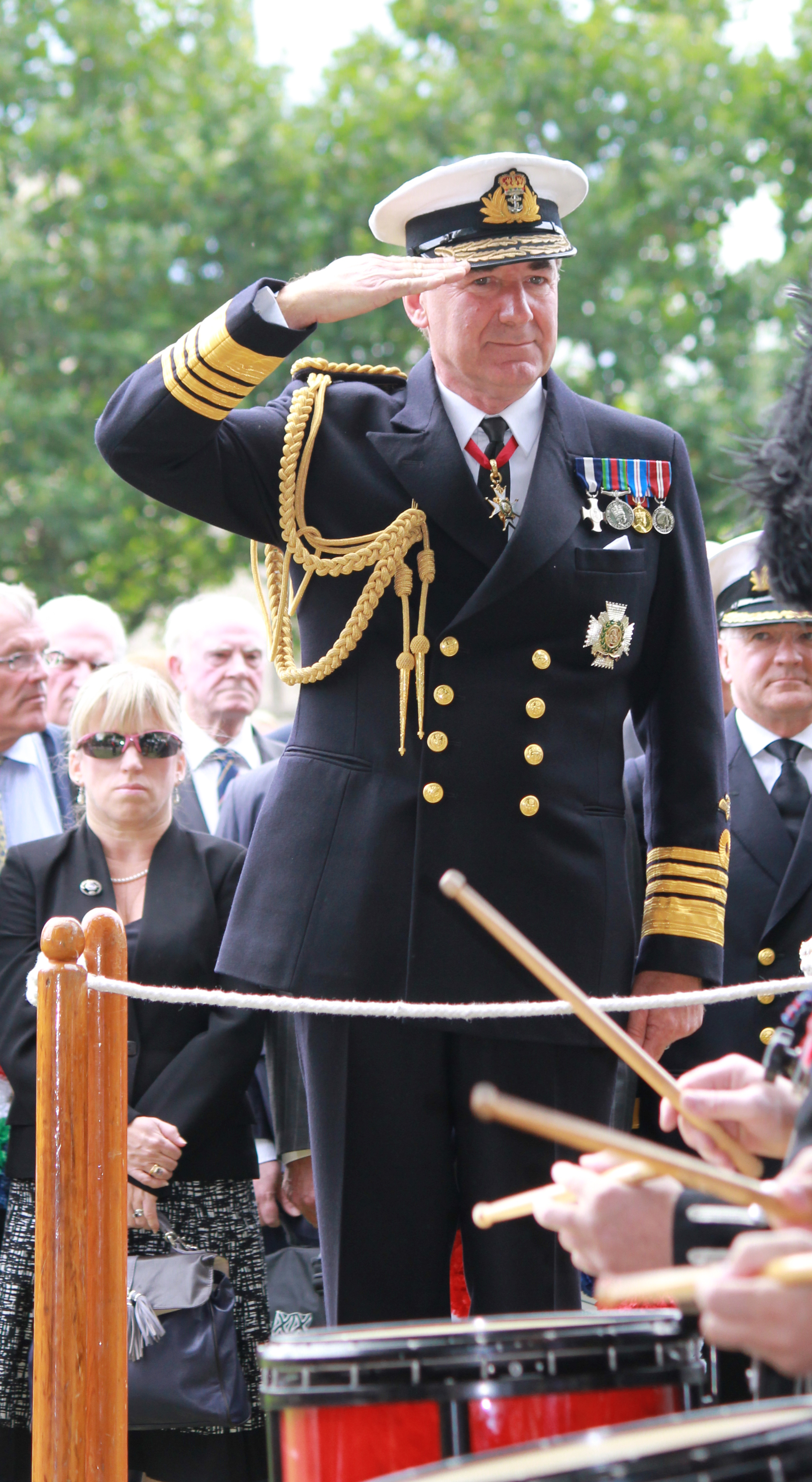
Sir George Zambellas was appointed First and Principal Naval Aide-de-Camp at the same time as his appointment as First Sea Lord. Aiguillettes on the right shoulder are the insignia of an Aide-de-Camp.

Since 1972, the office has been united with that of First Sea Lord.

== Flag Aide-de-Camp ==
Flag Aide-de-Camp was, for a time, the designation given to the next most senior naval aide-de-camp after the First and Principal Naval ADC (namely between 1972 and 2012). The Commander-in-Chief Naval Home Command invariably held this appointment; in October 2012 the post of Commander-in-Chief Naval Home Command was abolished, since when the appointment of Flag Aide-de-Camp appears to be in abeyance.
