= John Frewen =

Royal Navy Admiral (1911-1975)

Admiral Sir John Frewen GCB
- Portrait by Walter Bird, 1961
- Born: 28 March 1911
- Died: 1 September 1975 (aged 64)
- Military career
- Allegiance: United Kingdom
- Branch: Royal Navy
- Rank: Admiral
- Commands: HMS Mounts Bay; Home Fleet; Channel; Portsmouth; Naval Home Command
- Conflicts: World War II; Korean War
- Awards: Knight Grand Cross of the Order of the Bath

Admiral Sir John Byng Frewen, GCB (28 March 1911 – 1 September 1975) was Commander-in-Chief Naval Home Command.

== Naval career ==
Frewen joined the Royal Navy in 1924. He served in World War II in the Russian Convoys and as squadron navigating officer for aircraft carriers in the Pacific. He also served in the Korean War as commander of HMS Mounts Bay.

He was appointed chief of staff to the commander-in-chief, Home Fleet, in 1959 and then became Flag Officer Second in Command Far East Fleet in 1961. He went on to be Vice Chief of the Naval Staff in 1963 and commander-in-chief, Home Fleet, in 1965. He was then appointed Commander-in-Chief, Portsmouth, in 1967. Finally he was appointed the first Commander-in-Chief Naval Home Command (following the merger of the Portsmouth and Plymouth Commands) in 1969. In that capacity he welcomed Sir Alec Rose back to Portsmouth after his single-handed trip around the world. Frewen was also First and Principal Naval Aide-de-Camp to the Queen from 1968 to 1970. He retired in 1970.

In retirement Frewen transferred Brickwall House School, a specialist school for boys with dyslexia, into an educational trust, which, after his death, was renamed by his cousin and godson Jonathan Frewen as Frewen College. In 1972 he was Chairman of the Royal Navy Club of 1765 & 1785 (United 1889).

Military offices
Preceded by Michael Le Fanu	Flag Officer Second-in-Command Far East Fleet; 1961–1962	Succeeded by Jack Scatchard
Preceded by Sir Varyl Begg	Vice Chief of the Naval Staff; 1963–1965	Succeeded by Sir John Bush
Preceded by Sir Charles Madden	Commander in Chief, Home Fleet; 1965–1967	Succeeded by Command disbanded
Preceded by Sir Frank Hopkins	Commander-in-Chief, Portsmouth; 1967–1969	Succeeded by Command disbanded
Preceded by New Post	Commander-in-Chief Naval Home Command; 1969–1970	Succeeded by Sir Horace Law
Honorary titles
Preceded by Sir Desmond Dreyer	First and Principal Naval Aide-de-Camp; 1968–1970	Succeeded by Sir Horace Law
