= William Staveley (Royal Navy officer) =

Royal Navy Admiral of the Fleet (1928–1997)

Admiral of the Fleet Sir William Staveley GCB DL
- Rear Admiral William Staveley c. late 1970s
- Born: 10 November 1928
- Died: 13 October 1997 (aged 68); Sevenoaks, Kent
- Military career
- Allegiance: United Kingdom
- Branch: Royal Navy
- Service years: 1942–1989
- Rank: Admiral of the Fleet
- Commands: First Sea Lord; Commander-in-Chief Fleet; HMS Albion; HMS Intrepid; HMS Zulu; HMS Houghton
- Conflicts: Indonesia–Malaysia confrontation
- Awards: Knight Grand Cross of the Order of the Bath

Admiral of the Fleet Sir William Doveton Minet Staveley GCB, DL (10 November 1928 – 13 October 1997) was a Royal Navy officer. Staveley saw service as a minesweeper commander on coastal patrol during the Indonesia–Malaysia confrontation before commanding a frigate and then an aircraft carrier and ultimately achieving higher command in the Navy. He served as First Sea Lord and Chief of Naval Staff in the late 1980s. In that role he fought hard for a fleet large enough to meet NATO commitments.

== Early life ==
Born the son of Admiral Cecil Staveley and Margaret Adela (née Sturdee), Staveley was educated at West Downs School, Winchester and the Royal Naval College, Dartmouth. He was a grandson of Admiral of the Fleet Sir Doveton Sturdee, a naval commander in the First World War.

== Naval career ==
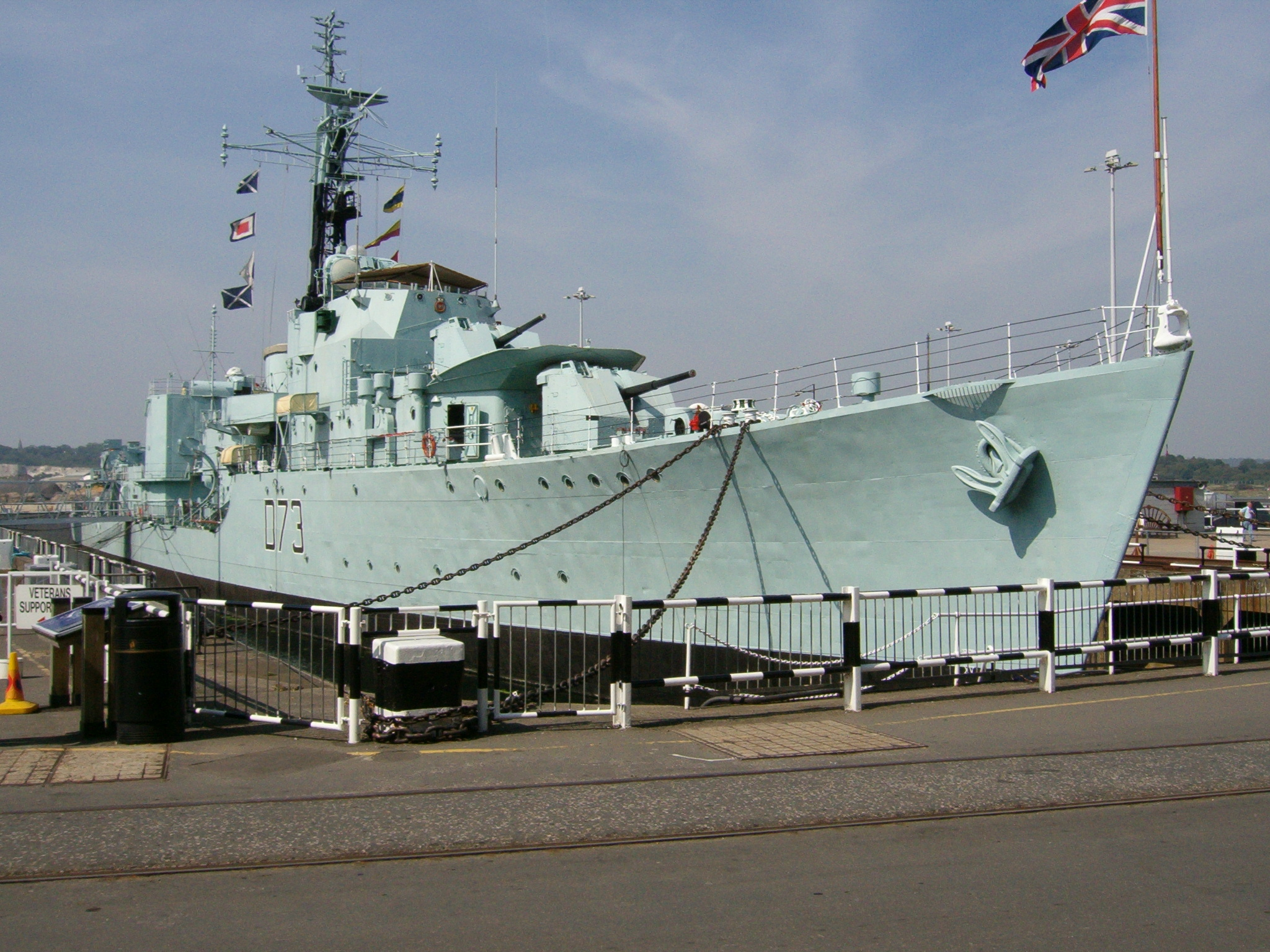
The destroyer HMS Cavalier in which Staveley was serving when he observed the hydrogen bomb tests in the late 1950s

He joined the Royal Navy as a cadet in 1942. Promoted to midshipman on 1 September 1946, he was posted to the cruiser HMS Ajax and then the destroyer HMS Zephyr. He was promoted to sub-lieutenant on 1 January 1948 and then served in the cruisers HMS Nigeria and HMS Bermuda. Promoted to lieutenant on 1 September 1950, he became Flag Lieutenant to the Commander-in-Chief Home Fleet in 1952, an instructor at the Royal Naval College, Dartmouth in 1954 and then served in HM Yacht Britannia from 1957. He served on the destroyer HMS Cavalier from November 1957, and having been promoted to lieutenant commander on 1 September 1958, he was present at the hydrogen bomb tests on Kiritimati.

Staveley attended the Royal Naval Staff College at Greenwich in 1959 and then joined the staff of the Commander-in-Chief, The Nore. Promoted to commander on 31 December 1961, he was given command of the minesweeper HMS Houghton in January 1962 and saw service on coastal patrol during the Indonesia–Malaysia confrontation later that year. After a tour as Commander, Sea Training from 1964, he was given command of the frigate HMS Zulu in October 1967 and promoted to captain on appointment as Assistant Director of Naval Plans at the Ministry of Defence on 31 December 1967. He went on to command the amphibious warfare ship HMS Intrepid as Flag Captain to the Second-in-Command of the Far East Fleet in November 1970 and was given command of the aircraft carrier HMS Albion in May 1972. He attended the Royal College of Defence Studies in 1973 and became Director of Naval Plans at the Ministry of Defence in February 1974.

=== Flag rank ===
Staveley was appointed Flag Officer, Second Flotilla in October 1976. He was promoted to rear admiral on 7 January 1977 and became Flag Officer, Carriers & Amphibious Ships and NATO Commander, Carrier Striking Group Two in March 1977. He went on to be Chief of Staff to the Commander-in-Chief Fleet in October 1978 and, having been promoted to vice admiral on 11 April 1980, he became Vice Chief of the Naval Staff in July 1980. He was appointed a Knight Commander of the Order of the Bath in the 1981 Birthday Honours. Staveley was promoted to full admiral on 29 October 1982 on appointment as Commander-in-Chief Fleet and NATO Commander-in-Chief, Channel and Commander-in-Chief Eastern Atlantic. He was advanced to Knight Grand Cross of the Order of the Bath in the 1984 Birthday Honours, he became First Sea Lord and Chief of the Naval Staff on 2 August 1985. In that role he fought hard for a fleet large enough to meet NATO commitments. He was promoted to Admiral of the Fleet on his retirement in May 1989.

== Later career ==
In retirement Staveley became Chairman of the Royal London Hospital and Associated Community Services NHS Trust, Chairman of the British School of Osteopathy and Chairman of the North East Thames Regional Health Authority as well as Chairman of the Chatham Historic Dockyard. He also became President of the Kent Branch of the Royal British Legion, vice-president of the Falkland Islands Association, a Member of the Court of the University of Kent and a governor of Sutton Valence School. He was also a Freeman of the City of London, a Liveryman of the Shipwrights' Company and a younger brother of Trinity House.

Staveley became a Deputy Lieutenant of Kent on 14 February 1992. He died of a heart attack at Sevenoaks in Kent on 13 October 1997.

== Family ==
In 1954 Staveley married Bettina Kirstine Shuter; they had a son and a daughter.

== Sources ==
- Heathcote, Tony (2002). The British Admirals of the Fleet 1734 – 1995. Pen & Sword Ltd. ISBN 0-85052-835-6.

Military offices
Preceded by James Eberle	Flag Officer Carriers and Amphibious Ships; 1977–1978	Succeeded by Peter Herbert
Preceded by Sir Anthony Morton	Vice Chief of the Naval Staff; 1980–1982	Succeeded by Sir Peter Stanford
Preceded by Sir John Fieldhouse	Commander-in-Chief Fleet; 1982–1985	Succeeded by Sir Nicholas Hunt
Preceded by Sir John Fieldhouse	First Sea Lord; 1985–1989	Succeeded by Sir Julian Oswald
