= Tim Lees-Spalding =

Rear-Admiral Tim Lees-Spalding CB
- Born: Ian Jaffery Lees-Spalding; 16 June 1920; Ealing, London
- Died: 1 July 2001; Winchester, Hampshire
- Military career
- Allegiance: United Kingdom
- Branch: Royal Navy
- Service years: 1938–1974
- Rank: Rear-Admiral
- Conflicts: World War II
- Awards: Companion of the Order of the Bath; King's Commendation for Brave Conduct

Rear-Admiral Ian Jaffery "Tim" Lees-Spalding, CB (16 June 1920 – 1 July 2001) was a senior marine engineer in the Royal Navy before becoming Administrator of the London International Film School and co-founder of the Macmillan and Silk Cut Nautical Almanac.

== Early life ==
Lees-Spalding, always known as Tim, was born in Ealing, London, on 16 June 1920, and educated at Blundell's School in Tiverton and the Royal Naval Engineering College.

== Naval career ==
Lees-Spalding had joined the Royal Navy in 1938 and in 1941, while still under training, was awarded a King's Commendation for Brave Conduct for digging out with his bare hands a woman trapped beneath a pile of rubble after a German night air raid on Plymouth. A year later, he was awarded a Royal Lifesaving Institution Medal for rescuing a drowning man from the sea off Teignmouth.

In 1943 Lees-Spalding went to sea in the anti-aircraft cruiser HMS Sirius, which saw action in the Mediterranean, and he was present at Operation Husky, the invasion of Sicily in July.

Following the Italian Armistice in September 1943, the 12th Cruiser Squadron, of which Sirius was part, landed troops of the British 1st Airborne Division at Taranto. The ship suffered bomb damage off the Greek island of Leros in October and Lees-Spalding was still serving when Sirius took part in the Normandy Landings in June 1944 before returning to the Mediterranean for the invasion of southern France in August. In January 1945, Sirius helped to host the Anglo-American talks prior to the Yalta Conference, providing accommodation for the Foreign Secretary Anthony Eden and the US Secretary of State Edward Stettinius.

Lees-Spalding later served in submarines, before being promoted to commander in 1952; this was followed by service in HMS Cleopatra (a sister-ship to Sirius) and the new destroyer HMAS Duchess.

As the Commander (Executive Officer) of the Royal Naval Engineering College, by now located at Manadon near Plymouth, Lees-Spalding was the first non-Gunnery Officer to preside over the Queen's Birthday Parade on Plymouth Hoe in 1959. He subsequently returned to sea as the Commander (E) of the new cruiser HMS Tiger in the Far East.

Promoted to captain in 1962, Lees-Spalding undertook a variety of engineering staff jobs ashore. Towards the end of his naval career he was promoted to rear admiral in June 1969 he was appointed Chief of Staff, Naval Home Command, a post he held until June 1971. He was next appointed as Chief Staff Officer (Technical) to the Commander-in-Chief Fleet. He was appointed a Companion of the Order of the Bath in 1973.

== Later career ==
After leaving the Royal Navy in 1974, Lees-Spalding was appointed Administrator of the London International Film School. Despite no previous experience in the field, he quickly sorted out the school's financial problems.

In 1981 Lees-Spalding co-founded the Macmillan and Silk Cut Nautical Almanac, which became a handbook for Britain's yachtsmen, and Lees-Spalding remained editor until 1992.

== Sources ==
- Obituary of Rear-Adml Tim Lees-Spalding, The Daily Telegraph, 28 August 2001.
