= Henry Houghton =

Henry Houghton may refer to:

- Henry Oscar Houghton (1823–1893), American publisher and mayor
- Henry Houghton (Royal Navy officer) (died 1703)

== See also ==
- Harry Houghton (1905–1985), spy for Poland and the USSR
