= Horace Law =

Royal Navy Admiral (1911–2005)

Admiral Sir Horace Law GCB OBE DSC
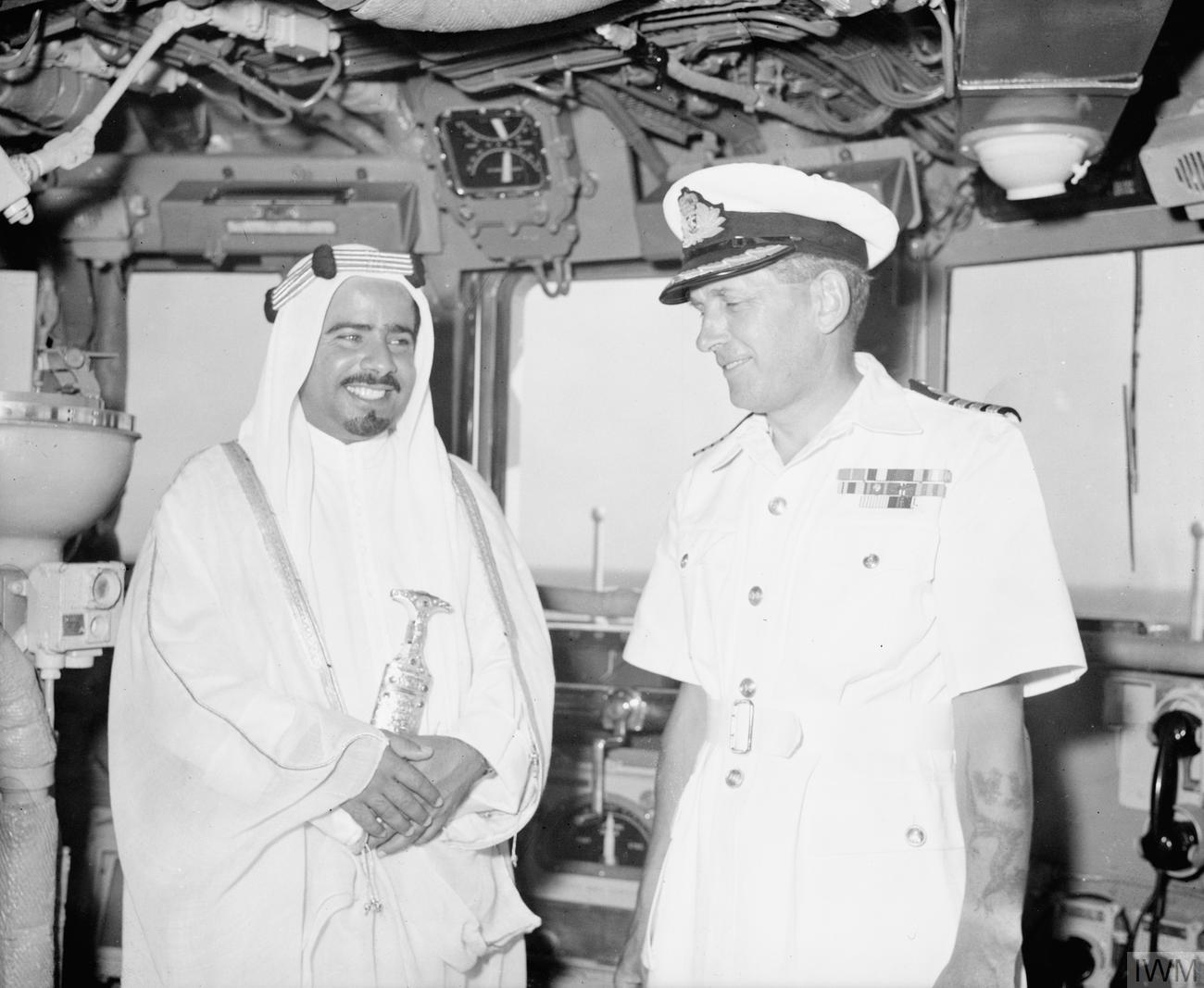
- Law (right) with Isa bin Salman Al Khalifa (1959)
- Born: 23 June 1911; Dublin, Ireland
- Died: 30 January 2005 (aged 93)
- Military career
- Allegiance: United Kingdom
- Branch: Royal Navy
- Rank: Admiral
- Commands: HMS Centaur; Britannia Royal Naval College; Commander-in-Chief Naval Home Command
- Conflicts: World War II; Korean War
- Awards: Knight Grand Cross of the Order of the Bath; Officer of the Order of the British Empire; Distinguished Service Cross

Admiral Sir Horace Rochfort Law, GCB, OBE, DSC (23 June 1911 – 30 January 2005) was Commander-in-Chief, Naval Home Command.

== Naval career ==
Educated at Sherborne School and the Royal Naval College Dartmouth, Law joined the Royal Navy in 1929. He became a Gunnery specialist in 1937.

=== War service ===
Law served in World War II in the anti-aircraft cruiser HMS Cairo in 1939, the cruiser HMS Coventry in 1940 and the cruiser HMS Nigeria in 1942. He was awarded the Distinguished Service Cross for his role in the British landings in Greece and the subsequent evacuations from Greece and Crete.

He served in the Korean War arranging naval gunfire support for the Korean Army.

=== Post-war service ===
He was appointed commanding officer of the destroyer HMS Duchess in 1951 and the carrier HMS Centaur in 1958 and then made Commander of Britannia Royal Naval College in 1960.

He went on to be Flag Officer Sea Training in 1961, Flag Officer Submarines in 1963 and Controller of the Navy in 1965. He was made Commander-in-Chief Naval Home Command and Flag Officer, Portsmouth Area in 1970. He was also First and Principal Naval Aide-de-camp to the Queen from 1970 to 1972. He retired in 1972.

== Retirement ==
In retirement he became Chairman of Hawthorn Leslie and Company and was a member of Security Commission from 1973 to 1982.

In 1979 he was invited to deliver the MacMillan Memorial Lecture to the Institution of Engineers and Shipbuilders in Scotland. He chose the subject "Belief and Discipline in a Free Society".

== Personal life ==
In 1941 he married Heather Coryton: they went on to have two sons and two daughters. Law was a resident of South Harting, West Sussex, where he was a lay preacher at the parish church; a room at the church is named after him. He was president of the Officers' Christian Union and chairman of the Church Army Board during the 1970s and 1980s.

He was a Governor of Monkton Combe School from 1969 to 1994.

Military offices
Preceded by Sir Peter Gretton	Flag Officer Sea Training; 1961–1963	Succeeded by Patrick Bayly
Preceded by Hugh Mackenzie	Flag Officer Submarines; 1963–1965	Succeeded by Ian McGeoch
Preceded by Sir Michael Le Fanu	Controller of the Navy; 1965–1970	Succeeded by Sir Michael Pollock
Preceded by Sir John Frewen	Commander-in-Chief Naval Home Command; 1970–1972	Succeeded by Sir Andrew Lewis
Honorary titles
Preceded by Sir John Frewen	First and Principal Naval Aide-de-Camp; 1970–1972	Succeeded by Sir Michael Pollock
