= Andrew Lewis (Royal Navy officer) =

Royal Navy Admiral (1918–1993)

Admiral Sir Andrew Lewis KCB JP
- Born: Andrew MacKenzie Lewis; 24 January 1918; Gilston, Hertfordshire, England
- Died: 8 November 1993 (aged 75); Finchingfield, Essex
- Military career
- Allegiance: United Kingdom
- Branch: Royal Navy
- Rank: Admiral
- Commands: Commander-in-Chief Naval Home Command
- Conflicts: World War II
- Awards: Knight Commander of the Order of the Bath; Knight of the Order of St John

Admiral Sir Andrew MacKenzie Lewis KCB JP (24 January 1918 – 8 November 1993) was Commander-in-Chief Naval Home Command.

== Naval career ==
Lewis joined the Royal Navy and fought in World War II being mentioned in despatches for his service in HMS Ashanti.

He was appointed Director-General, Weapons (Naval) at the Ministry of Defence in 1965 and Flag Officer, Flotillas for the Western Fleet in 1968. He went on to be Second Sea Lord and Chief of Naval Personnel in 1970 and Commander-in-Chief Naval Home Command in 1972; he retired in 1974.

In retirement he became Chairman of the Essex Water Company, later Essex and Suffolk Water Company. Between 1976 and 1977 he was Chairman of the Royal Navy Club of 1765 & 1785 (United 1889).

Lewis was also Lord Lieutenant of Essex from 1978 to 1992. He died in 1993.

== Family ==
In 1943 he married Rachel Elizabeth Leatham: their elder son is the Very Reverend Christopher Lewis, Dean of Christ Church, Oxford.

Military offices
Preceded by Sir Frank Twiss	Second Sea Lord; 1970–1971	Succeeded by Sir Derek Empson
Preceded by Sir Horace Law	Commander-in-Chief Naval Home Command; 1972–1974	Succeeded by Sir Derek Empson
Preceded by John Ruggles-Brise	Lord Lieutenant of Essex; 1978–1992	Succeeded by Lord Braybrooke
