= Jack Scatchard =

Royal Navy Vice-Admiral (1910–2001)

Vice-Admiral Jack Scatchard CB DSC**
- Born: 5 September 1910; Tadcaster, West Riding of Yorkshire
- Died: 22 June 2001 (aged 90)
- Military career
- Allegiance: United Kingdom
- Branch: Royal Navy
- Service years: 1923–1964
- Rank: Vice-Admiral
- Commands: Joint Service Defence College; 5th Destroyer Squadron; HMS Termagant; HMS Garth
- Conflicts: Second World War
- Awards: Companion of the Order of the Bath; Distinguished Service Cross & Two Bars; Mentioned in Despatches

Vice-Admiral John Percival Scatchard, CB, DSC & Two Bars (5 September 1910 – 22 June 2001) was a senior officer in the Royal Navy. He served for a time as Flag Officer Second-in-Command of the Far East Fleet.

== Naval career ==
Educated at Aysgarth School in Yorkshire and the Royal Naval College Dartmouth, Scatchard joined the Royal Navy in 1923. He fought in the Second World War, initially as First Lieutenant in the destroyer HMS Kashmir until it was bombed and sunk on 23 May 1941. He went on to command the destroyer HMS Garth and then, from late in 1943, the destroyer HMS Termagant. He served with distinction and was awarded the Distinguished Service Cross & two Bars.

After the war, Scatchard became Executive Officer of RNAS Easthaven and was then appointed First Lieutenant of the battleship HMS Vanguard in September 1946. He went on to serve in the Plans Division of the Admiralty, as Captain (D) Portsmouth and as then as Chief Officer (Administration) to the Commander-in-Chief, Portsmouth. After attending the Imperial Defence College, he was appointed Captain 5th Destroyer Squadron in 1957. He became Director of Naval Equipment at the Admiralty in 1958 and Commandant of the Joint Service Defence College in 1960. He went on to be Flag Officer Second-in-Command of the Far East Fleet in 1962, was promoted to vice admiral on 14 August 1963, and retired in 1964.

== Family ==
In 1943 Scatchard married Margaret Niven: they had one daughter.
