= Nicholas Hunt =

Royal Navy Admiral (1930–2013)

Admiral Sir Nicholas Hunt GCB LVO DL
- Admiral Sir Nicholas Hunt
- Born: Nicholas John Streynsham Hunt; 7 November 1930; Hawarden, Flintshire, Wales
- Died: 25 October 2013 (aged 82); Shere, Surrey, England
- Spouse(s): Meriel Eve Hunt, Lady Hunt (née Givan)
- Relatives: Jeremy Hunt (son)
- Military career
- Allegiance: United Kingdom
- Branch: Royal Navy
- Service years: 1952–1987
- Rank: Admiral
- Commands: Commander-in-Chief Fleet and Allied Commander-in-Chief Channel and Eastern Atlantic. Flag Officer Scotland and Northern Ireland; Director-General, Naval Manpower and Training; Flag Officer, Second Flotilla; HMS Intrepid; HMS Troubridge; HMS Palliser; HMS Burnaston
- Awards: Knight Grand Cross of the Order of the Bath; Lieutenant of the Royal Victorian Order

Admiral Sir Nicholas John Streynsham Hunt GCB LVO DL (7 November 1930 – 25 October 2013) was a senior Royal Navy officer. He was Commander-in-Chief Fleet from 1985 to 1987.

== Early life ==
Hunt was born on 7 November 1930 in Hawarden, Flintshire, the younger son of Brigadier John Montgomerie Hunt of the 5th Battalion, 2nd Punjab Regiment, Indian Army, and his wife Elizabeth, daughter of barrister Walter Baldwyn Yates. The Hunt family were landed gentry, of Boreatton, Baschurch, Shropshire. A cousin was Agnes Hunt, pioneer of orthopaedic nursing.

== Naval career ==
Hunt was educated at the Royal Naval College, Dartmouth. After graduating, he gained a commission in the Royal Navy and was promoted to lieutenant on 31 July 1952. He served as Assistant Private Secretary to Princess Marina, Duchess of Kent from 1959 to 1962. Promoted to lieutenant commander on 17 August 1960, he was posted to the Directorate of Naval Plans at the Ministry of Defence in 1966.

Hunt became executive officer of HMS Ark Royal in 1969 and was then given command of the amphibious warfare ship HMS Intrepid in February 1974 before attending the Royal College of Defence Studies later that year. He went on to be Director of Naval Plans at the Ministry of Defence in August 1976 and captain of the Royal Naval College, Dartmouth in October 1978. Appointed aide-de-camp to the Queen on 7 July 1980 (which post he held until 7 January 1981), he became Flag Officer, Second Flotilla in October 1980. He was promoted to rear admiral on 7 January 1981 and became Director-General, Naval Manpower and Training in November 1981.

Hunt was promoted to vice admiral on 6 December 1983, on appointment as Flag Officer Scotland and Northern Ireland, and to admiral on 25 June 1985, on appointment as Commander-in-Chief Fleet and Allied Commander-in-Chief Channel and Eastern Atlantic. He retired from the Navy on 26 July 1987.

== Later life ==
Hunt was Deputy Managing Director at Eurotunnel from 1987 to 1989 and Director-General of the Chamber of Shipping from 1991 to 1997. He also held part-time appointments including Chairman of the South West Surrey District Health Authority from 1990 to 1995, Chairman of Nuffield Hospitals from 1996 to 2001, Commissioner of the Commonwealth War Graves Commission from 1988 to 1992 and Chairman of Chatham Historic Dockyard from 1998 to 2005. He also became Chairman of Ferrero UK Ltd in 2005.

Hunt was known to be a strong supporter of the nuclear deterrent and was Chairman of the Royal Navy Club of 1765 & 1785 (United 1889). He became Deputy lieutenant to the Lord-lieutenant of Surrey on 23 January 1996.

Hunt was appointed Rear-Admiral of the United Kingdom in 1994, holding that post until 1997 when he became Vice-Admiral of the United Kingdom and Lieutenant of the Admiralty, positions that he held until 2001.

He died at his home on 25 October 2013 at the age of 82.

== Personal life ==
In 1966, he married Meriel Eve Givan, daughter of Major Henry C. Givan of the Isle of Wight, formerly of Rangoon. Together they had two sons (the elder of whom is the former Foreign Secretary and the former Chancellor of the Exchequer Jeremy Hunt) and one daughter. Lady Hunt died in 2022.

== Awards and decorations ==
On 20 July 1961, Hunt was made a Member of the Fourth Class of the Royal Victorian Order. Members of this class were renamed Lieutenants in 1984 and henceforth used the post-nominals LVO. Hunt was appointed a Knight Commander of the Order of the Bath in the 1985 New Year Honours. He was advanced to Knight Grand Cross of the Order of the Bath in the 1987 New Year Honours.

Hunt was made a Freeman of the City of London in 1988.

Military offices
| Preceded by Robert Squires | Flag Officer, Scotland and Northern Ireland; 1983–1985 | Succeeded by Sir George Vallings |
| Preceded by Sir William Staveley | Commander-in-Chief Fleet; 1985–1987 | Succeeded by Sir Julian Oswald |
Honorary titles
| Preceded by Sir James Eberle | Rear-Admiral of the United Kingdom; 1994–1997 | Succeeded by Sir Jeremy Black |
| Preceded by Sir James Eberle | Vice-Admiral of the United Kingdom; 1997–2001 | Succeeded by Sir Jeremy Black |
