= Michael Layard =

Royal Navy Admiral (born 1936)

Admiral Sir Michael Layard KCB CBE
- Born: 3 January 1936 (age 90)
- Military career
- Allegiance: United Kingdom
- Branch: Royal Navy
- Service years: 1954–1996
- Rank: Admiral
- Commands: Naval Home Command; HMS Cardiff; RNAS Culdrose; 899 Naval Air Squadron
- Conflicts: Falklands War
- Awards: Knight Commander of the Order of the Bath; Commander of the Order of the British Empire

Admiral Sir Michael Henry Gordon Layard, KCB, CBE (born 3 January 1936) is a retired senior Royal Navy officer who served as Second Sea Lord from 1992 to 1995.

== Naval career ==
Educated at Pangbourne College and the Britannia Royal Naval College, Layard was commissioned into the Royal Navy in 1954. He trained as a fighter pilot and in 1970 he took command of 899 Naval Air Squadron flying Sea Vixens. He became Commander (Air) in HMS Ark Royal in 1977 and Chief Staff Officer to the Flag Officer, Naval Air Command in 1979. Promotion to captain followed on 30 June 1979. During the Falklands War he was Senior Naval Officer in the MV Atlantic Conveyor, which was sunk by two exocet missiles.

Layard became Commander of RNAS Culdrose in 1982, Captain of the destroyer HMS Cardiff in 1984 and Director Naval Warfare (Air) at the Ministry of Defence in 1985. He went on to be Flag Officer Naval Air Command in 1988, Director General, Naval Manpower and Training in 1990 and Second Sea Lord and Chief of Naval Personnel in 1992 (and, concurrently, President of the Royal Naval College, Greenwich from 1993). From 1994 he was asked to combine this role with that of Commander-in-Chief Naval Home Command.

== Later life ==
In retirement Layard became a Trustee of the Fleet Air Arm Museum, and a Governor of Pangbourne College.

Layard owns a 32-foot yacht, Banjo.

== Family ==
In 1966 Layard married Elspeth Horsley Fisher. They have two sons.

Military offices
Preceded by Sir Michael Livesay	Second Sea Lord; 1992–1995	Succeeded by Sir Michael Boyce
Preceded by Sir John Kerr	Commander-in-Chief Naval Home Command; 1993–1995	Succeeded by Sir Michael Boyce
Court offices
Preceded by Sir Edward Burgess	Gentleman Usher to the Sword of State; 1997–2005	Succeeded by Sir John Allison
