= Henry Houghton (Royal Navy officer) =

Rear-Admiral Henry Houghton
- Died: 17 June 1703
- Military career
- Allegiance: Kingdom of England; Kingdom of Great Britain
- Branch: Royal Navy
- Service years: 1686–1703
- Rank: Rear-Admiral
- Commands: HMS Devonshire; HMS Dorsetshire; HMS Shrewsbury; HMS Humber; Commander-in-Chief, Portsmouth; HMS Bedford; HMS Prince George; HMS Barfleur; HMS St Michael; HMS Royal Katherine; HMS Britannia
- Conflicts: Nine Years' War; action at Barfleur

Rear-Admiral Henry Houghton (died 17 June 1703) was a Royal Navy officer who became Commander-in-Chief, Portsmouth.

== Naval career ==
Promoted to captain on 13 June 1689, Houghton was given command of the third-rate HMS Devonshire in early 1692 and took part in the action at Barfleur in May 1692. He went on to command the third-rate HMS Dorsetshire and then the third-rate HMS Shrewsbury in 1695 before transferring to the third-rate HMS Humber in 1697. He went on to be Commander-in-Chief, Portsmouth in 1698. He returned to sea and was given command of the third-rate HMS Bedford in March 1701 and took part in the Battle of Vigo Bay in October 1702. He went on to command the second-rate HMS Prince George, the second-rate HMS Barfleur and the second-rate HMS St Michael all in the spring of 1703. He went on to command the second-rate HMS Royal Katherine and then the first-rate HMS Britannia in the summer of 1703. He died on 17 June 1703.
