= Varyl Begg =

Royal Navy Admiral of the Fleet (1908–1995)

Admiral of the Fleet Sir Varyl Begg GCB DSO DSC KStJ
- Rear Admiral Varyl Begg in 1957

Governor of Gibraltar
- In office March 1969 – 3 October 1973
- Monarch: Elizabeth II
- Mayor: Joshua Hassan; William Thompson; Alfred J. Vasquez
- Preceded by: Sir Gerald Lathbury
- Succeeded by: Sir John Grandy

First Sea Lord
- In office 15 March 1966 – 12 August 1968
- Prime Minister: Harold Wilson
- Preceded by: Sir David Luce
- Succeeded by: Sir Michael Le Fanu

Personal details
- Born: 1 October 1908 Kensington, London
- Died: 13 July 1995 (aged 86)

Military service
- Allegiance: United Kingdom
- Branch/service: Royal Navy
- Years of service: 1926–1973
- Rank: Admiral of the Fleet
- Commands: First Sea Lord; Commander-in-Chief, Portsmouth; British Far East Command; HMS Triumph; HMS Cossack
- Battles/wars: Second World War: Norwegian campaign; Suda Bay; Korean War: Battle of Inchon; Indonesia–Malaysia confrontation
- Awards: Knight Grand Cross of the Order of the Bath; Companion of the Distinguished Service Order; Distinguished Service Cross; Mentioned in Despatches (2); Commander of the Order of the Defender of the Realm (Malaysia)

Admiral of the Fleet Sir Varyl Cargill Begg, GCB, DSO, DSC, KStJ (1 October 1908 – 13 July 1995) was a Royal Navy officer. He fought in the Second World War as gunnery officer on a cruiser taking part in the North Atlantic convoys, the Norwegian campaign and the occupation of Iceland and then as gunnery officer on a battleship operating in the Mediterranean Fleet during the Battle of Cape Matapan. After that he commanded a destroyer during the Korean War and was Commander-in-Chief of Far East Command during the Indonesia–Malaysia confrontation. He was First Sea Lord and Chief of the Naval Staff in the late 1960s. In that role he vehemently opposed plans to introduce large new aircraft carriers and instead managed to persuade the British Government to develop the design for three small "through-deck cruisers".

== Early career ==
Born the son of Francis Cargill Begg and Muriel Clare Begg (née Robinson), Begg was educated at St Andrew's School, Eastbourne and Malvern College, before joining the navy as a special entry cadet in September 1926. Promoted to midshipman on 1 September 1927, he was posted to the cruiser HMS Durban on the China Station in October 1927 and then to the battleship HMS Marlborough in the Atlantic Fleet in April 1929. Promoted to sub-lieutenant on 1 November 1929 and to lieutenant on 1 December 1930, he joined the cruiser HMS Shropshire in the Mediterranean Fleet in April 1931 before training as a gunnery specialist at the shore establishment HMS Excellent in 1934. After qualifying in gunnery, he was then made second gunnery officer of the battleship HMS Nelson, flagship of the Home Fleet, in December 1934 before returning to HMS Excellent in 1936. He was appointed flotilla gunnery officer in the destroyer HMS Cossack in November 1937 and, having been promoted to lieutenant commander on 1 December 1938, he became gunnery officer of the 6-inch (152 mm) gun cruiser HMS Glasgow in June 1939.

== Second World War ==
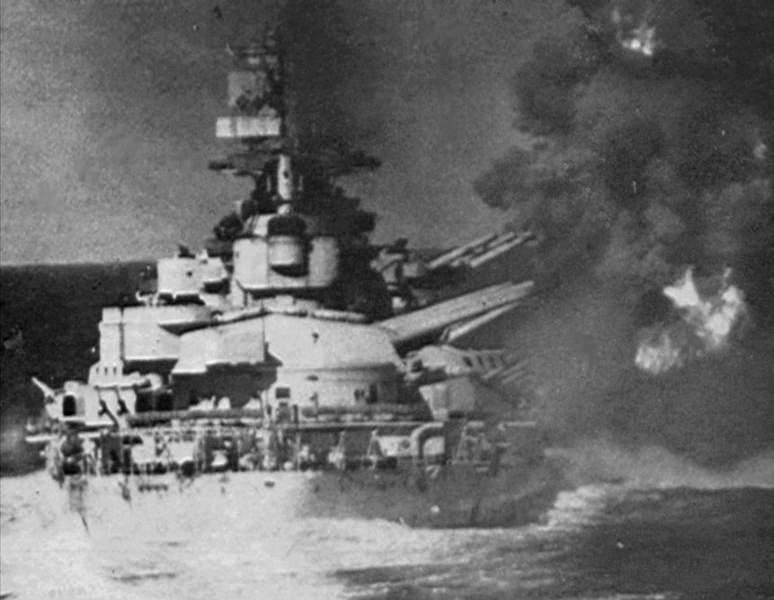
The Italian battleship Vittorio Veneto firing upon the Allied cruisers during the Battle of Cape Matapan

It was on board the Glasgow that Begg first saw action in the Second World War: Glasgow participated in North Atlantic convoys, the Norwegian campaign and the occupation of Iceland, before being badly damaged in a torpedo attack by Italian aircraft at Souda Bay in Crete in December 1940. In January 1941 he was appointed gunnery officer of the battleship HMS Warspite in the Mediterranean Fleet when it was flagship of the Commander-in-Chief, Admiral Sir Andrew Cunningham (soon to be First Sea Lord himself). Begg was in charge of Warspite's main 15-inch (381 mm) guns during the Battle of Cape Matapan on the night of 28 March 1941. It was an engagement in which the ships Warspite, Barham and Valiant caught the Italian heavy cruisers Fiume and Zara by surprise, with their guns still trained fore and aft, and sank them both in a brutally short action of less than two minutes. A third heavy cruiser, Pola, and two Italian destroyers were also sunk in the engagement. Begg was mentioned in despatches and awarded the Distinguished Service Cross for his part in the action. He was promoted to commander on 31 December 1942 and then went to the gunnery division in the Admiralty, where he remained until after the war.

== Senior command ==
After the war, Begg joined the cruiser HMS Phoebe as operations officer for the destroyers in the Mediterranean Fleet. Promoted to captain on 30 June 1947, he was given command of the gunnery school at Chatham in 1948 and of the destroyer HMS Cossack as captain of the 8th Destroyer Flotilla in August 1950. Cossack took part in the Korean War, being involved in the pre-invasion shelling and blockade of Inchon and Begg was mentioned in despatches and appointed a Companion of the Distinguished Service Order on 3 October 1952.

Begg was given command of the shore establishment HMS Excellent in April 1952 and officiated as the Officer Commanding the Naval Contingent at the Coronation of Queen Elizabeth II in June 1953. He went on to command the aircraft carrier HMS Triumph in December 1954. Having attended the Imperial Defence College, he was appointed Naval Aide-de-Camp to the Queen on 7 July 1956. Promoted to rear-admiral on 7 January 1957, he became Chief of Staff to the Commander-in-Chief, Portsmouth in February 1957 and went on to be Flag Officer, Second-in-Command, Far East Fleet, in December 1958. Appointed Companion of the Order of the Bath in the 1959 New Year Honours and promoted to vice-admiral on 21 May 1960, he became Vice Chief of the Naval Staff in January 1961. He was advanced to Knight Commander of the Order of the Bath in the 1962 New Year Honours. He was promoted to full admiral on 8 March 1963, on appointment as Commander-in-Chief of Far East Command and British military adviser to the South East Asia Treaty Organization, at a time of when President Sukarno of Indonesia was stepping up pressure on Malaysia. Advanced to Knight Grand Cross of the Order of the Bath in the 1965 Birthday Honours and appointed an honorary Commander of the Malaysian Order of the Defender of the Realm, he went on to be Commander-in-Chief, Portsmouth in August 1965.

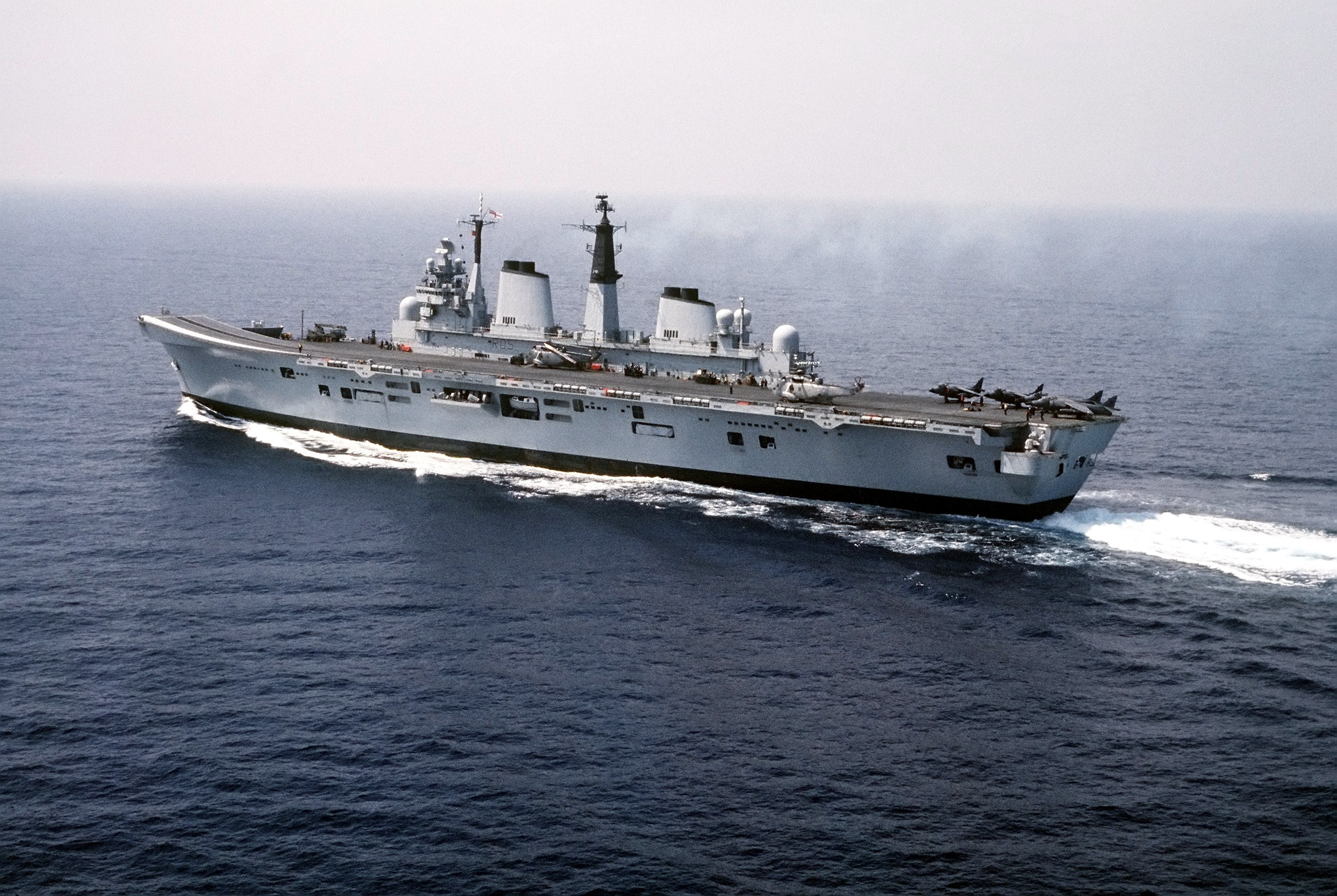
The aircraft carrier HMS Invincible, the first of the "through-deck cruisers" that Begg advocated as First Sea Lord

Begg was appointed First Sea Lord and Chief of the Naval Staff, following the sudden resignation of his predecessor Sir David Luce, in March 1966. Begg strongly believed that the future of the Navy depended as much on surface-to-air missiles as on naval air power, and he vehemently opposed plans to introduce large new aircraft carriers. Instead he managed to persuade the British Government to design and develop three small "through-deck cruisers". He was promoted to Admiral of the Fleet on his retirement on 12 August 1968. He became a Knight of the Order of St John in March 1969.

== Later career ==
In March 1969 Begg was appointed Governor of Gibraltar where a residential development is still named after him. He left Gibraltar in 1973 and retired to his home at Stockbridge in Hampshire. His interests included fishing, gardening and sports – during his naval career he had been President of the Combined Services Winter Sports Association and President of Royal Navy Cricket. He suffered from Alzheimer's disease and died on 13 July 1995.

== Family ==
In 1943 he married Rosemary Cowan; they had two sons.

== Sources ==
- Edwards, Paul (2010). Historical Dictionary of the Korean War. Scarecrow Press. ISBN 978-0810867734.
- Heathcote, Tony (2002). The British Admirals of the Fleet 1734 – 1995. Pen & Sword Ltd. ISBN 0-85052-835-6.

Military offices
Preceded by Sir Walter Couchman	Vice Chief of the Naval Staff; 1961–1963	Succeeded by Sir John Frewen
New title Command re-established Post last held by Sir Henry Pownall in 1942	C-in-C Far East Command; 1963–1965	Succeeded by Sir John Grandy
Preceded by Sir Wilfrid Woods	C-in-C Portsmouth; 1965–1966	Succeeded by Sir Frank Hopkins
Preceded by Sir David Luce	First Sea Lord; 1966–1968	Succeeded by Sir Michael Le Fanu
Government offices
Preceded by Sir Gerald Lathbury	Governor of Gibraltar; 1969–1973	Succeeded by Sir John Grandy
