= Jeremy Black (Royal Navy officer) =

Royal Navy Admiral (1932–2015)

Admiral Sir Jeremy Black GBE KCB DSO
- Born: John Jeremy Black; 17 November 1932; Tavistock, Devon
- Died: 25 November 2015 (aged 83)
- Military career
- Allegiance: United Kingdom
- Branch: Royal Navy
- Service years: 1946–1991
- Rank: Admiral
- Commands: Commander-in-Chief Naval Home Command (1989–91); Flag Officer First Flotilla (1982–84); HMS Invincible (1981–82); HMS Fife (1977–79); HMS Decoy (1969–70); HMS Fiskerton (1961–63)
- Conflicts: Korean War; Indonesia–Malaysia confrontation: Limbang raid; Falklands War
- Awards: Knight Grand Cross of the Order of the British Empire; Knight Commander of the Order of the Bath; Distinguished Service Order

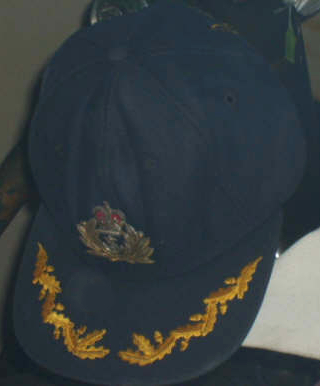
Black's cap worn whilst in command of Invincible, on display at the Imperial War Museum

Sir John Jeremy Black (17 November 1932 – 25 November 2015), also known as J. J. Black, was a senior Royal Navy officer. He commanded the aircraft carrier HMS Invincible during the Falklands War, and later served as Commander-in-Chief Naval Home Command from 1989 until his retirement in 1991.

== Naval career ==
Jeremy Black was born in Tavistock, Devon on 17 November 1932. He was educated at the Royal Naval College, when it was at Eaton Hall, and saw service in a number of theatres including Korea and Borneo. He was appointed a Member of the Order of the British Empire in 1960 for his work in Borneo but his most famous appointment was as captain of the aircraft carrier HMS Invincible during the Falklands War in 1982. Black was an inspirational leader to his crew: this was reflected by the ship's company designing T-shirts with 'There and Back with JJ Black' emblazoned across the front. This slogan later gave Black the title ('There and Back') of his memoirs.

In October 1982, Black was promoted to rear admiral and appointed Flag Officer First Flotilla. This was followed by a position in the Ministry of Defence as Assistant Chief of the Naval Staff in 1984 before being appointed Deputy Chief of the Defence Staff (Systems) in 1986. He became Commander-in-Chief Naval Home Command in 1989. He retired in 1991.

== Later life and death ==
In retirement Black held the posts of Rear-Admiral and then Vice-Admiral of the United Kingdom. Black was chairman of the Royal Navy Club of 1765 & 1785 (United 1889).

Black died after a long illness on 25 November 2015 at the age of 83.

== Honours and awards ==
- 8 June 1963 – Lieutenant Commander John Jeremy Black, Royal Navy is appointed a Member of the Order of the British Empire (MBE)
- 8 October 1982 – Captain John Jeremy Black, MBE, Royal Navy is awarded the Distinguished Service Order (DSO):
  Throughout Operation Corporate, Captain Black displayed outstanding qualities of professionalism, leadership and stamina in his command of HMS Invincible. She shared with HMS Hermes the provision of almost all the air power from start to finish, without which the operation could not even have been contemplated. To keep men and machinery operating at the peak of their performance for such an extended period so far away from home base has required exceptional powers of concentration, man management and perseverance and HMS Invincible's success owes much to these qualities so abundantly held by her commanding officer. In addition, HMS Invincible had to stay in the South Atlantic after cessation of hostilities to maintain a presence; in doing so she was continuously at sea far longer that any other RN ship before her. To make this transition from war to "peace" but without the advantage of an early return to the UK required a very special understanding of both men and material and again Captain Black showed outstanding leadership qualities in maintaining momentum.
- 31 December 1986 – Vice Admiral John Jeremy Black, DSO, MBE is appointed a Knight Commander of the Order of the Bath (KCB).
- 15 June 1991 – Admiral Sir (John) Jeremy Black, KCB, DSO, MBE, ADC is appointed a Knight Grand Cross of the Order of the British Empire (GBE)

== Notes ==
Military offices
New title	Assistant Chief of the Naval Staff; 1985–1986	Succeeded by Michael Livesay
Preceded by Sir Donald Hall	Deputy Chief of the Defence Staff (Systems); 1986–1989	Succeeded by Sir Anthony Mullens
Preceded by Sir John Woodward	Commander-in-Chief Naval Home Command; 1989–1991	Succeeded by Sir John Kerr
Honorary titles
Preceded by Sir Nicholas Hunt	Rear-Admiral of the United Kingdom; 1997–2001	Succeeded by Sir Kenneth Eaton
Preceded by Sir Nicholas Hunt	Vice-Admiral of the United Kingdom; 2001–2005	Succeeded by Sir James Burnell-Nugent
