= John Kerr (Royal Navy officer) =

Royal Navy Admiral (1937–2019)

Admiral Sir John Kerr GCB DL
- Born: 27 October 1937; Sale, Cheshire, England
- Died: 2 December 2019 (aged 82); Grange-over-Sands, Cumbria, England
- Military career
- Allegiance: United Kingdom
- Branch: Royal Navy
- Service years: 1954–1994
- Rank: Admiral
- Commands: Naval Home Command; Chief of Defence Intelligence; HMS Illustrious; HMS Birmingham; HMS Achilles
- Awards: Knight Grand Cross of the Order of the Bath

Admiral Sir John Beverley Kerr, GCB, DL (27 October 1937 – 2 December 2019) was a senior officer in the Royal Navy.

== Career ==
During his naval career Kerr commanded a frigate, a guided missile destroyer, and the aircraft carrier HMS Illustrious. In 1986 he was appointed Flag Officer First Flotilla. He was appointed Chief of Defence Intelligence in 1988. Kerr's naval career culminated in his appointment as Commander-in-Chief Naval Home Command and member of the Admiralty Board in 1991. Kerr retired from the navy in May 1994.

In retirement Kerr became involved in the governance of Higher Education. He served on the Council and Court of the Victoria University of Manchester since 1998 and the Court of UMIST since 2000. He was part of the small group that oversaw the merger of UMIST and the Victoria University, including chairing the committee that drafted the charter of the new University of Manchester and became the Pro-Chancellor from its inauguration in 2004.

In 1998 Kerr became vice-chairman of the Commonwealth War Graves Commission. He was also a commissioner of the Museums and Galleries. He also served as a member of the national Independent Review of Higher Education Pay and Conditions in 1999.

Kerr died on 2 December 2019 at the age of 82.

Military offices
Preceded by Sir Derek Boorman	Chief of Defence Intelligence; 1988–1991	Succeeded by Sir John Walker
Preceded by Sir Jeremy Black	Commander-in-Chief Naval Home Command; 1991–1993	Succeeded by Sir Michael Layard
