= Frank Hopkins (Royal Navy officer) =

Royal Navy Admiral (1910–1990)

Admiral Sir Frank Hopkins KCB DSO DSC
- Portrait by Walter Bird, 1960
- Born: 23 June 1910; Wallington, Surrey
- Died: 14 April 1990 (aged 79); Hawaii, United States
- Military career
- Allegiance: United Kingdom
- Branch: Royal Navy
- Service years: 1927–1967
- Rank: Admiral
- Commands: Portsmouth Command; Royal Naval College, Dartmouth; HMS Ark Royal; HMS Myngs; 830 Naval Air Squadron
- Conflicts: Second World War; Korean War
- Awards: Knight Commander of the Order of the Bath; Distinguished Service Order; Distinguished Service Cross; Mentioned in dispatches (2)

Admiral Sir Frank Henry Edward Hopkins, KCB, DSO, DSC (23 June 1910 – 14 April 1990) was a senior officer in the Royal Navy.

== Naval career ==
Educated at the Nautical College at Pangbourne in Berkshire, Hopkins joined the Royal Navy in 1927.

Hopkins served in the Second World War, initially on the staff of the naval observer school at Ford in Sussex. In 1940, he transferred to 826 Naval Air Squadron and then to RAF Coastal Command. Then in 1941, he took command of 830 Naval Air Squadron, sinking large quantities of German shipping in the Mediterranean. He went on to join the British Air Commission in Washington DC, before becoming an observer with the United States Pacific Fleet.

Hopkins also served in the Korean War as Air Commander in the aircraft-carrier HMS Theseus. He was appointed Deputy Director, Naval Air Organization and Training Division, in 1951, and then went on to be Commander of HMS Myngs, before being made Director, Naval Air Warfare Division. He went on to be Captain of HMS Ark Royal, before becoming Commandant of the Royal Naval College, Dartmouth, in 1958. In 1960, he became Flag Officer, Flying Training, and in 1962 he was made Flag Officer, Aircraft Carriers.

Hopkins was appointed Deputy Chief of the Naval Staff and Fifth Sea Lord in 1963. He was one of the admirals who threatened to resign in protest over the decision by the Labour Secretary of State for Defence, Denis Healey, to cancel the CVA-01 aircraft carrier programme. His last role was as Commander-in-Chief, Portsmouth, in 1966; he retired in 1967.

== Family ==
In 1933, Hopkins married Joan Mary Standring; they had one daughter. Following a divorce, he married Lois Barbara Cook in 1939; there were no children. Following the death of his second wife, he married Georgianna Priest in 1988.

Military offices
Preceded by Sir Peter Gretton	Fifth Sea Lord; 1963–1965	Post disbanded
Preceded by Sir Varyl Begg	Commander-in-Chief, Portsmouth; 1966–1967	Succeeded by Sir John Frewen
