= Desmond Cassidi =

Royal Navy Admiral (1925–2019)

Admiral Sir Desmond Cassidi GCB
- Born: 26 January 1925
- Died: 10 October 2019 (aged 94)
- Military career
- Allegiance: United Kingdom
- Branch: Royal Navy
- Service years: 1938–1985
- Rank: Admiral
- Commands: Naval Home Command; Naval Air Command; Naval Manpower and Training; Carriers and Amphibious Ships; HMS Ark Royal; 2nd Frigate Squadron; HMS Undaunted; HMS Whitby; 820 Naval Air Squadron
- Conflicts: Second World War
- Awards: Knight Grand Cross of the Order of the Bath

Admiral Sir Arthur Desmond Cassidi, GCB (26 January 1925 – 10 October 2019) was a Royal Navy officer who served as Commander-in-Chief Naval Home Command from 1983 to 1984.

== Naval career ==
Cassidi joined the Royal Navy in 1938. Commissioned in 1943, he was promoted to sub-lieutenant in February 1944. He served in HMS Cumberland and HMS Hardy with the Iceland Patrols and Russian Convoys during the Second World War and also took part in the Normandy landings.

Cassidi was promoted to lieutenant in February 1946 and lieutenant commander in October 1953. He became the commanding officer of 820 Naval Air Squadron in 1954. Promoted to commander on 31 December 1956, he became the commanding officer of HMS Whitby in 1960. He went on to be assistant director of Naval Plans (Warfare) in the Ministry of Defence in 1964, Commanding Officer of HMS Undaunted, and Captain of the 2nd Frigate Squadron in 1967. In 1970, he returned to the Ministry of Defence as the Director of Naval Plans.

Cassidi became Commanding Officer of HMS Ark Royal in 1972 and Flag Officer, Carriers and Amphibious Ships in 1974. He became Director-General, Naval Manpower and Training in 1975 and Flag Officer Naval Air Command in 1978. He then became Second Sea Lord and Chief of Naval Personnel in 1979 and Commander-in-Chief Naval Home Command in 1982. He retired in 1985.

== Family and later life ==
In 1950, Cassidi married Sheelagh Marie Scott; they had one son and two daughters. Following the death of his first wife, he married Deborah Marion Pollock in 1982.

Cassidi lived near Langport in Somerset.

He died on 10 October 2019 at the age of 94.

Military offices
Preceded by Raymond Lygo	Flag Officer Carriers and Amphibious Ships; 1974–1975	Succeeded by James Eberle
Preceded by Sir Gordon Tait	Second Sea Lord; 1979–1982	Succeeded by Sir Simon Cassels
Preceded by Sir James Eberle	Commander-in-Chief Naval Home Command; 1983–1984	Succeeded by Sir Peter Stanford
