= Peter Stanford (Royal Navy officer) =

Royal Navy Admiral (1929–1991)

Admiral Sir Peter Stanford GCB LVO
- Born: 11 July 1929
- Died: 22 May 1991 (aged 61)
- Allegiance: United Kingdom
- Branch: Royal Navy
- Service years: 1948–1987
- Rank: Admiral
- Commands: HMY Britannia; HMS Hermione; Commander-in-Chief Naval Home Command
- Awards: Knight Grand Cross of the Order of the Bath; Lieutenant of the Royal Victorian Order

Admiral Sir Peter Maxwell Stanford, GCB, LVO (11 July 1929 – 22 May 1991) was Commander-in-Chief Naval Home Command.

== Naval career ==
Stanford was commissioned into the Royal Navy in 1948. He was appointed Executive Officer of HMY Britannia in 1969 and Commanding Officer of HMS Hermione as well as Captain of the 5th Frigate Squadron in 1974. He was next appointed Flag Officer, Second Flotilla from October 1980 to November 1981. Promoted to Vice-Admiral in 1982, he went on to be Vice Chief of the Naval Staff in 1982 and, following further promotion to admiral in 1984, he was made Commander-in-Chief Naval Home Command. He retired in 1987.

He is buried in Hambledon in Hampshire.

== Family ==
He was married to Ann Lingard: they went on to have one son and two daughters.

Military offices
Preceded by Sir William Staveley	Vice Chief of the Naval Staff; 1982–1984	Succeeded by Post Disbanded
Preceded by Sir Desmond Cassidi	Commander-in-Chief Naval Home Command; 1984–1987	Succeeded by Sir Sandy Woodward
