= John Walker (RAF officer) =

British air force officer (1936–2025)

Sir John Walker
- Born: 26 May 1936
- Died: 29 January 2025 (aged 88)
- Military career
- Allegiance: United Kingdom
- Branch: Royal Air Force
- Service years: 1956–1995
- Rank: Air Marshal
- Commands: Chief of Defence Intelligence (1991–94); Central Tactics and Trials Organisation (1979–81); RAF Bruggen (1976–78); RAF Lossiemouth (1975–76); No. 226 Operational Conversion Unit RAF (1974–75); Jaguar Conversion Team (1973–74)
- Awards: Knight Commander of the Order of the Bath; Commander of the Order of the British Empire; Air Force Cross; Queen's Commendation for Valuable Service in the Air

Air Marshal Sir John Robert Walker, KCB, CBE, AFC, FRAeS (26 May 1936 – 29 January 2025) was a British Royal Air Force officer who served as Chief of Defence Intelligence from 1991 to 1994.

== Biography ==
Walker joined the Royal Air Force in 1954 and was commissioned on 31 July 1956. He served as a pilot with No. 66 Squadron flying Hunters from 1957 until he joined No.4 Squadron also flying Hunters in 1959. After attending the RAF Staff College, Bracknell in 1966, he served as an exchange officer with the Twelfth Air Force, a formation of the United States Air Force, from 1967 to 1969. He became officer commanding the Jaguar Conversion Team at RAF Lossiemouth in June 1973, station commander at RAF Lossiemouth in August 1975 and station commander at RAF Bruggen in 1976.

He went on to be Group Captain, Offensive Operations at Headquarters RAF Germany in January 1978, Air Officer-in-Chief, Central Tactics and Trials Organisation in December 1979 and, after attending the Royal College of Defence Studies, Director of Forward Policy (RAF) at the Ministry of Defence in December 1982. After that he became Senior Air Staff Officer at RAF Strike Command in May 1985, Deputy Chief of Staff (Operations) at Headquarters Allied Air Forces Central Europe in April 1987 and Director-General Management & Support Intelligence at the Ministry of Defence 1989. His last appointment was as Chief of Defence Intelligence in 1991 before retirement in January 1995.

Walker died on 29 January 2025, at the age of 88.

Military offices
Preceded by Sir John Kerr	Chief of Defence Intelligence; 1991–1994	Succeeded by Sir John Foley
