= Vice Chief of the Naval Staff (United Kingdom) =

UK naval appointment

- Ensign of the Royal Navy
- Department of the Admiralty, Ministry of Defence
- Abbreviation: V.C.N.S.
- Member of: Board of Admiralty, Admiralty Board
- Reports to: Deputy Chief of the Naval Staff
- Nominator: First Lord of the Admiralty, Secretary of State for Defence
- Appointer: Prime Minister; Subject to formal approval by the King-in-Council
- Term length: Not fixed (typically 2–3 years)
- Formation: 1941
- First holder: Sir Henry Moore
- Final holder: Sir Peter Stanford
- Abolished: 1985

The Vice Chief of the Naval Staff (V.C.N.S.) was a senior appointment in the Royal Navy usually a three-star rank and had a NATO ranking code of OF-8 that existed from 1941 to 1985 and was a member of the Admiralty Naval Staff.

== History ==
In October 1941 the post of Vice-Chief of the Naval Staff was created when the Admiralty abolished the title of Deputy Chief of the Naval Staff in line with changes that were also taking place within the army and air force. It was essentially the same role as the Deputy Chief of the Naval Staff: the post holder initially was the operational head of the Royal Navy and reported directly to the First Sea Lord.

In 1946 the office of the Deputy Chief of the Naval Staff was revived and the Vice Chief of the Naval Staff from that point reported to the Deputy Chief of the Naval Staff.

Following internal re-structuring within the Ministry of Defence the position of Vice Chief of the Naval Staff was abolished in 1985.

== Vice Chiefs of the Naval Staff ==
Vice Chiefs of the Naval Staff included:
Note: reports to the First Sea Lord from 1941 to 1946 then reports to the DCNS from 1947 until 1985

No.	Portrait	Chief-of-Staff	Took office	Left office	Time in office	Ref.
1	Sir Henry Moore	Vice Admiral; Sir Henry Moore	21 October 1941	7 June 1943	1 year, 7 months	
2	Sir Neville Syfret	Vice Admiral; Sir Neville Syfret	8 June 1943	October 1945	2 years, 3 months	
3	Sir Rhoderick McGrigor	Vice Admiral; Sir Rhoderick McGrigor	October 1945	October 1947	2 years	
4	Sir John Edelsten	Vice Admiral; Sir John Edelsten	October 1947	November 1949	2 years, 1 month	
5	Sir George Creasy	Vice Admiral; Sir George Creasy	November 1949	October 1951	1 year, 11 months	
6	Sir Guy Grantham	Vice Admiral; Sir Guy Grantham	October 1951	April 1954	2 years, 6 months	
7	Sir William Davis	Vice Admiral; Sir William Davis	April 1954	May 1957	3 years, 1 month	
8	Sir Caspar John	Vice Admiral; Sir Caspar John	May 1957	February 1960	2 years, 9 months	
9	Sir Walter Couchman	Vice Admiral; Sir Walter Couchman	February 1960	November 1960	9 months	
10	Sir Varyl Begg	Vice Admiral; Sir Varyl Begg	January 1961	February 1963	2 years, 1 month	
11	Sir John Frewen	Vice Admiral; Sir John Frewen	February 1963	April 1965	2 years, 2 months	
12	Sir John Bush	Vice Admiral; Sir John Bush	April 1965	August 1967	2 years, 4 months	
13	Sir Peter Hill-Norton	Vice Admiral; Sir Peter Hill-Norton	August 1967	December 1968	1 year, 4 months	
14	Sir Edward Ashmore	Vice Admiral; Sir Edward Ashmore	December 1968	January 1971	2 years, 1 month	
15	Sir Terence Lewin	Vice Admiral; Sir Terence Lewin	January 1971	October 1973	2 years, 9 months	
16	Sir John Treacher	Vice Admiral; Sir John Treacher	October 1973	April 1975	1 year, 6 months	
17	Sir Raymond Lygo	Vice Admiral; Sir Raymond Lygo	April 1975	January 1978	2 years, 9 months	
18	Sir Anthony Morton	Vice Admiral; Sir Anthony Morton	January 1978	July 1980	2 years, 6 months	
19	Sir William Staveley	Vice Admiral; Sir William Staveley	July 1980	October 1982	2 years, 3 months	
20	Sir Peter Stanford	Vice Admiral; Sir Peter Stanford	October 1982	October 1985	3 years	

== See also ==
- Assistant Chief of the Naval Staff
- Deputy Chief of the Naval Staff
- First Sea Lord
- Second Sea Lord
- Third Sea Lord
- Fourth Sea Lord
- Fifth Sea Lord

== General references ==
- Primary source for this article is by Harley Simon, Lovell Tony, (2017), Vice Chief of Naval Staff, http://www.dreadnoughtproject.org.
- http://www.dreadnoughtproject.org/Assistant Chief of Naval Staff
- http://www.gulabin.com/Royal Navy - Senior Appointments
