= David Williams (Royal Navy officer) =

Royal Navy Admiral (1921–2012)

Admiral Sir David Williams GCB
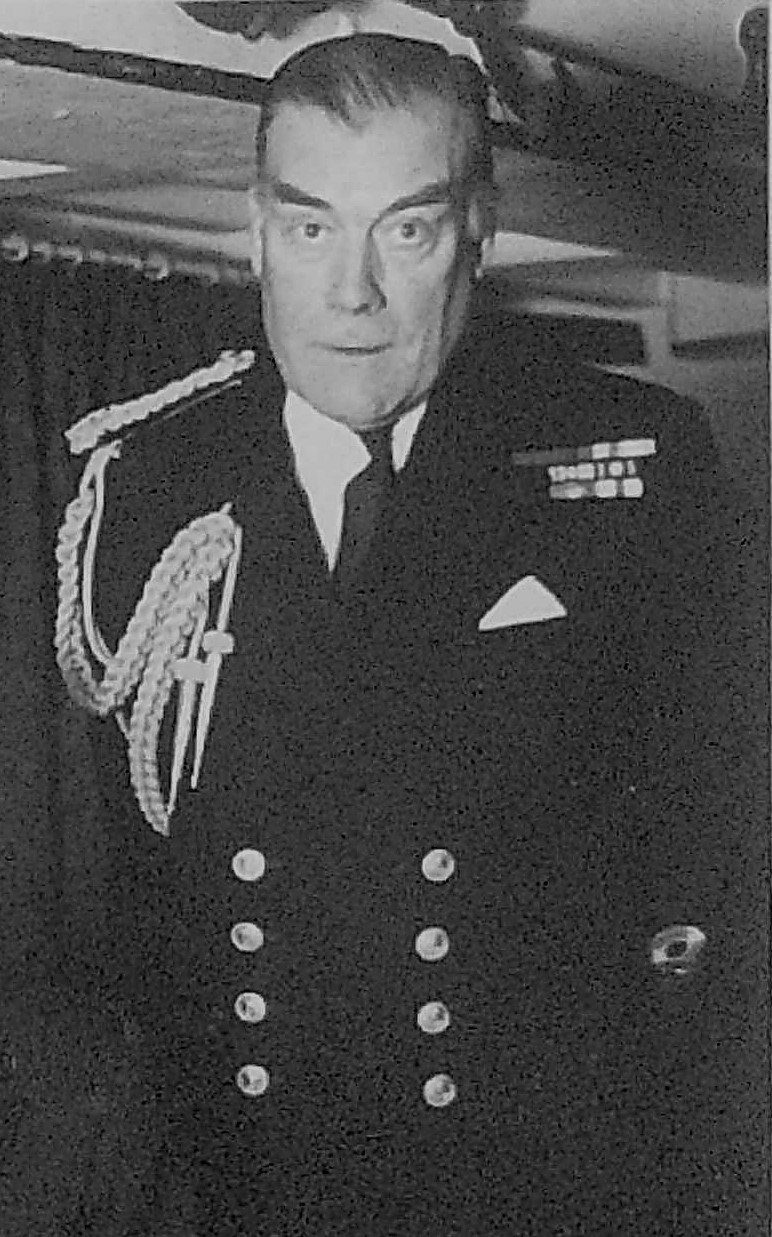
- Admiral Sir David Williams R. N. in 1978
- Born: 22 October 1921; Ashford, Kent
- Died: 16 July 2012 (aged 90)
- Military career
- Allegiance: United Kingdom
- Branch: Royal Navy
- Service years: 1935–79
- Rank: Admiral
- Commands: Commander-in-Chief Naval Home Command; Second Sea Lord and Chief of Naval Personnel; Director-General, Naval Manpower and Training; Flag Officer Second-in-Command Far East Fleet; Flag Officer, Second Flotilla; Britannia Royal Naval College; HMS Devonshire; HMS Jewel
- Conflicts: Second World War
- Awards: Knight Grand Cross of the Order of the Bath; Mentioned in Despatches
- Other work: Governor of Gibraltar (1982–85)

Admiral Sir David Williams, GCB (22 October 1921 – 16 July 2012) was a senior officer in the Royal Navy and Governor of Gibraltar.

== Early life ==
Williams was educated at Yardley Court in Tonbridge.

== Naval career ==
Williams was appointed Flag Officer Second-in-Command Far East Fleet in 1970. Appointed Flag Officer, Second Flotilla from March 1971 to March 1972. He was then Director-General, Naval Manpower and Training from April 1972 to February 1974. He was then promoted to Second Sea Lord and Chief of Naval Personnel in 1974, with the rank of full admiral from 8 September 1974; and then Commander-in-Chief Naval Home Command from 1976 to May 1979 when he retired.

Between 1980 and 1982 he was Chairman of the Royal Navy Club of 1765 & 1785 (United in 1889). On 26 October 1982 he became the Governor of Gibraltar. He held this position for three years until 19 November 1985.

He was a vice-president of the Friends of Gibraltar Heritage Society.

Military offices
Preceded by Sir Derek Empson	Second Sea Lord; 1974–1976	Succeeded by Sir Gordon Tait
Preceded by Sir Terence Lewin	Commander-in-Chief Naval Home Command; 1976–1979	Succeeded by Sir Richard Clayton
Government offices
Preceded by Sir William Jackson	Governor of Gibraltar; 1982–1985	Succeeded by Peter Terry
