= Richard Phillimore =

Royal Navy Admiral; Commander-in-Chief, Plymouth (1864–1940)

Admiral Sir Richard Phillimore GCB KCMG MVO
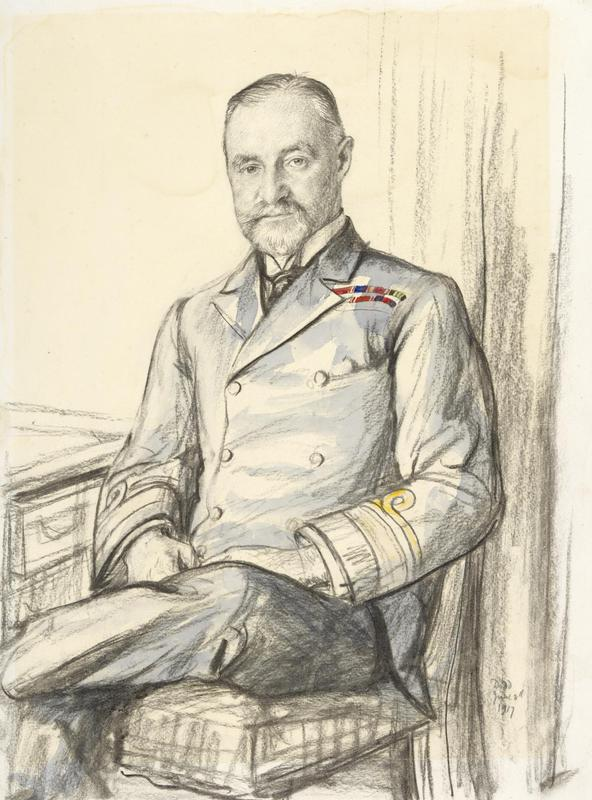
- 1917 portrait by Francis Dodd
- Born: 23 December 1864; Boconnoc, Cornwall
- Died: 8 November 1940 (aged 75); Botley, Hampshire
- Military career
- Allegiance: United Kingdom
- Branch: Royal Navy
- Service years: 1878–1929
- Rank: Admiral
- Commands: Plymouth Command (1923–26); Reserve Fleet (1920–22); 1st Battlecruiser Squadron (1916–18); HMS Inflexible (1911–12, 1914–15); HMS Aboukir (1909–11); HMS Juno (1907–09); HMS Mohawk (1903–04)
- Conflicts: Boxer Rebellion; First World War
- Awards: Knight Grand Cross of the Order of the Bath; Knight Commander of the Order of St Michael and St George; Member of the Royal Victorian Order

Admiral Sir Richard Fortescue Phillimore, GCB, KCMG, MVO (23 December 1864 – 8 November 1940) was a Royal Navy officer who served as Commander-in-Chief, Plymouth from 1923 to 1926.

== Naval career ==
Phillimore was born at Boconnoc in Cornwall on 23 December 1864, the son of Admiral Sir Augustus Phillimore, and educated at Westminster School. He joined the Royal Navy in 1878, was promoted to lieutenant on 20 August 1886, and to commander on 1 January 1899. He was posted to HMS Goliath on 27 March 1900, and joined her in the China Station where she took part in the response to the Boxer Rebellion later in 1900. He was given command of HMS Mohawk in 1903 and then led the Naval Brigade Machine Guns in Somaliland the next year. He was then given command of HMS Juno in 1907, HMS Aboukir in 1909 and the battlecruiser HMS Inflexible in 1911.

Phillimore served in the First World War, resuming command of HMS Inflexible in 1914, and then as Principal Beach Master for the landings at Cape Helles in the Dardanelles in April 1915. He went on to be liaison officer to the Imperial Russian Headquarters in 1915 and commander of the 1st Battlecruiser Squadron of the Grand Fleet in 1916. He was then made Admiral commanding the Aircraft of the Grand Fleet in 1917, and took part in Second Battle of Heligoland Bight in November that year.

After the war, Phillimore was appointed President of the Postwar Questions Committee and then commanded the Reserve Fleet from 1920. He was made Commander-in-Chief, Plymouth in 1923. He was First and Principal Naval Aide-de-Camp to King George V from 1928, and retired in 1929.

Phillimore is buried at Shedfield in Hampshire.

== Family ==
In 1905 he married Violet Turton; they had three sons and one daughter.

Military offices
Preceded by Sir Henry Oliver	Commander-in-Chief, Reserve Fleet; 1920–1922	Succeeded by Sir Douglas Nicholson
Preceded by Sir Montague Browning	Commander-in-Chief, Plymouth; 1923–1926	Succeeded by Sir Rudolph Bentinck
Honorary titles
Preceded by Sir Arthur Leveson	First and Principal Naval Aide-de-Camp; 1928–1929	Succeeded by Sir William Goodenough
