= Michael Le Fanu =

Royal Navy Admiral of the Fleet (1913–1970)

Admiral of the Fleet Sir Michael Le Fanu GCB DSC
- Then Rear Admiral Michael Le Fanu
- Born: 2 August 1913; Lindfield, England
- Died: 28 November 1970 (aged 57); London, England
- Military career
- Allegiance: United Kingdom
- Branch: Royal Navy
- Service years: 1926–1970
- Rank: Admiral of the Fleet
- Nickname: "Dry Ginger"
- Commands: First Sea Lord; Middle East; HMS Eagle; HMS Ganges; HMS Relentless
- Conflicts: Second World War: Norwegian campaign; Battle of the Mediterranean; Aden Emergency
- Awards: Knight Grand Cross of the Order of the Bath; Distinguished Service Cross; Mentioned in Despatches; Legion of Merit (United States)

Admiral of the Fleet Sir Michael Le Fanu, GCB, DSC (2 August 1913 – 28 November 1970) was a Royal Navy officer. He fought in the Second World War as gunnery officer in a cruiser operating in the Home Fleet during the Norwegian campaign and the Battle of the Mediterranean and then as gunnery officer in a battleship operating in the Eastern Fleet before becoming liaison officer between the British Pacific Fleet and the United States Third Fleet. After the War he commanded a frigate, a training establishment and an aircraft carrier. He served as First Sea Lord and Chief of the Naval Staff in the late 1960s. In that role, in the face of economic difficulties, he worked hard to reshape the Navy as an anti-submarine force operating primarily in the Atlantic Ocean.

== Early life ==
Born the son of Captain Hugh Barrington Le Fanu RN (of Huguenot descent) and Georgiana Harriott Le Fanu (née Kingscote), Le Fanu was educated at Bedford School and the Royal Naval College, Dartmouth.

== Naval career ==
Le Fanu joined the Royal Navy as a cadet in 1926 and was posted to the cruiser HMS Dorsetshire in the Atlantic Fleet before being promoted to midshipman on 1 September 1931 and being posted to the cruiser HMS York. Promoted to sub-lieutenant on 1 May 1934, he joined the destroyer HMS Whitshed in the Mediterranean Fleet in March 1935 and was promoted to lieutenant on 1 June 1935. He was posted to the destroyer HMS Bulldog in the Home Fleet in September 1936 before training as a gunnery specialist during 1938 and then being posted to the staff of the Commander-in-Chief, Mediterranean Fleet.

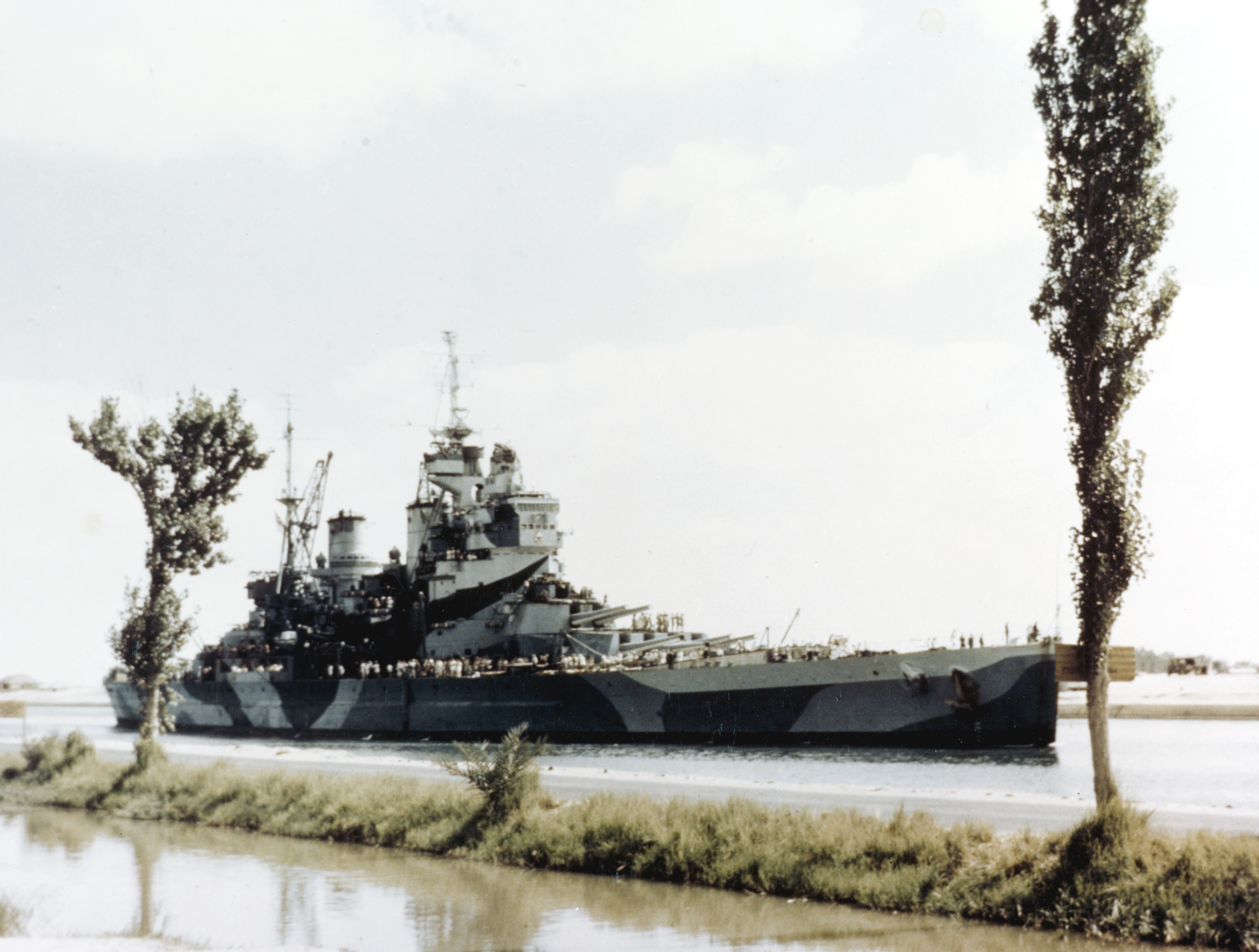
The battleship HMS Howe in which Le Fanu served as gunnery officer during the Second World War

Le Fanu served in the Second World War being posted to the cruiser HMS Aurora operating in the Home Fleet as gunnery officer in December 1939. While aboard Aurora, he was mentioned in despatches for his services during the Norwegian campaign in Spring 1940 and awarded the Distinguished Service Cross for his actions in November 1941 when an Italian convoy was destroyed during the Battle of the Mediterranean.

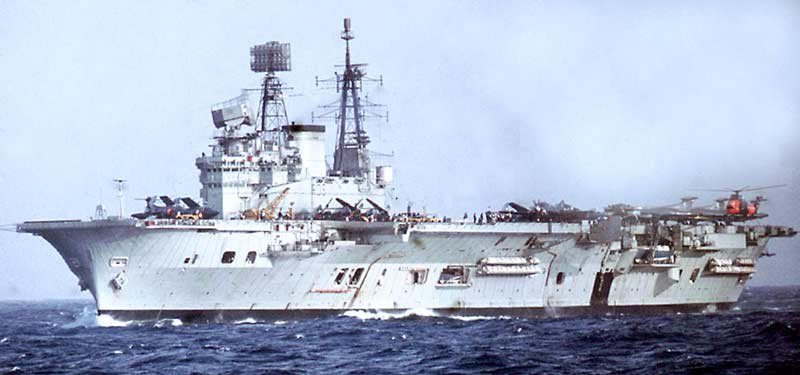
The aircraft carrier HMS Eagle which Le Fanu commanded in the late 1950s

Promoted to lieutenant commander on 1 June 1942, Le Fanu joined the gunnery staff of the Commander-in-Chief Home Fleet that month and then transferred to the battleship HMS Howe operating as part of the Eastern Fleet as gunnery officer in March 1944. Promoted to commander on 31 December 1944, he was posted as liaison officer between the British Pacific Fleet and the United States Third Fleet in January 1945 and was awarded the United States Legion of Merit for his actions. He was also invited to attend the signing of the Japanese Instrument of Surrender in the USS Missouri on 2 September 1945.

After the War Le Fanu served on the experimental staff at the shore establishment HMS Excellent and in 1948 he became executive officer in the cruiser HMS Superb. He was promoted to captain on 30 June 1949 and became Naval Assistant to the First Sea Lord at the Admiralty. He was given command of the frigate HMS Relentless as Captain (F) of the Third Training Squadron in October 1951, and returned to the Admiralty to join the staff of the Chief Scientist in 1952. He attended the Imperial Defence College in 1953 and became commanding officer of the training establishment HMS Ganges at Harwich in December 1954. He was given command of the aircraft carrier HMS Eagle in February 1957 and was promoted to rear admiral on 7 July 1958 on appointment as Director-General, Weapons at the Admiralty. He was appointed a Companion of the Order of the Bath in the 1960 Birthday Honours. He became Flag Officer Second in Command Far East Fleet in July 1960 and was promoted to vice admiral on 25 October 1961 on appointment as Controller of the Navy. Advanced to Knight Commander of the Order of the Bath in the 1963 Birthday Honours and promoted to full admiral on 29 September 1965, he became Commander-in-Chief, Middle East in December 1965. In that role he served as Joint Commander of the three services in the Middle East during the evacuation of British Nationals during the Aden Emergency.

Advanced to Knight Grand Cross of the Order of the Bath in the 1968 New Year Honours, Le Fanu became First Sea Lord and Chief of the Naval Staff in August 1968. In the face of economic difficulties he worked hard to reshape the Navy as an anti-submarine force operating primarily in the Atlantic Ocean. He was nominated for the post of Chief of the Defence Staff but never held the office because he was suddenly discovered to be terminally ill with Chronic Lymphocytic Leukaemia (CLL). He was promoted to Admiral of the Fleet on 3 July 1970, on his retirement, and died in London on 28 November 1970.

== Family ==
In 1943 Le Fanu married Prudence Grace Morgan, daughter of Admiral Sir Llewellyn Vaughan Morgan; they had two sons and a daughter.

== Sources ==
- Heathcote, Tony (2002). The British Admirals of the Fleet 1734 – 1995. Pen & Sword Ltd. ISBN 0-85052-835-6.

Military offices
Preceded by Sir Peter Reid	Third Sea Lord and Controller of the Navy; 1961–1965	Succeeded by Sir Horace Law
Preceded by Sir Varyl Begg	First Sea Lord; 1968–1970	Succeeded by Sir Peter Hill-Norton
