= James Eberle =

Royal Navy Admiral (1927–2018)

Admiral Sir James Eberle GCB
- Born: 31 May 1927
- Died: 17 May 2018 (aged 90)
- Military career
- Allegiance: United Kingdom
- Branch: Royal Navy
- Service years: 1941–1982
- Rank: Admiral
- Commands: Fleet; Naval Home Command
- Conflicts: Second World War
- Awards: Knight Grand Cross of the Order of the Bath

Admiral Sir James Henry Fuller Eberle, GCB (31 May 1927 – 17 May 2018) was a senior officer in the Royal Navy who served as Commander-in-Chief Fleet from 1979 until 1981.

== Naval career ==
Educated at Clifton College and the Royal Naval College, Dartmouth, Eberle was commissioned into the Royal Navy in 1941. He served in the Second World War.

Eberle was promoted to rear admiral in 1971 and was appointed Assistant Chief of Fleet Support the following year. He became Flag Officer Sea Training in 1974, Flag Officer Aircraft Carriers and Amphibious Ships in 1975 and Chief of Fleet Support in 1977. He was promoted to vice admiral on 25 January 1977, and to full admiral on 4 May 1979 as he was appointed Commander-in-Chief Fleet. He then became Commander-in-Chief Naval Home Command in 1981, and retired in 1982.

== Later life ==
In retirement Eberle became Director of the Royal Institute for International Affairs. He was also Rear Admiral and then Vice-Admiral of the United Kingdom and became Master of the Britannia Beagles hunt.

== Personal life ==
In 1950 Eberle married Ann Patricia Thompson; they went on to have one son, Peter, and two daughters, Susan and Sarah. Eberle died in May 2018 at the age of 90.

== Sources ==
- Eberle, James From Greenland's Icy Shore, Roundtuit Publishing, 2007; ISBN 978-1-904499-15-2

Military offices
Preceded by John Roberts	Flag Officer Sea Training; 1974–1975	Succeeded by John Gerard-Pearse
Preceded by Desmond Cassidi	Flag Officer Carriers and Amphibious Ships; 1975–1977	Succeeded by William Staveley
Preceded by Sir Peter White	Chief of Fleet Support; 1977–1979	Succeeded by Sir William Pillar
Preceded by Sir Henry Leach	Commander-in-Chief Fleet; 1979–1981	Succeeded by Sir John Fieldhouse
Preceded by Sir Richard Clayton	Commander-in-Chief Naval Home Command; 1981–1983	Succeeded by Sir Desmond Cassidi
Honorary titles
Preceded by Sir Anthony Morton	Rear-Admiral of the United Kingdom; 1988–1994	Succeeded by Sir Nicholas Hunt
Preceded by Sir Anthony Morton	Vice-Admiral of the United Kingdom; 1994–1997	Succeeded by Sir Nicholas Hunt
