= Naval Home Command =

- Active: 1969–2012
- Country: United Kingdom
- Branch: Royal Navy
- Type: Command (military formation)
- Garrison/HQ: Dockyard Commissioner's house, Royal Navy Dockyard, Portsmouth

Naval Home Command administered training and garrison functions for the Royal Navy from 1969 to 2012. Its commander was Commander-in-Chief, Naval Home Command (CINCNAVHOME).

== History ==
As the Royal Navy's size decreased during the Cold War, commands were amalgamated. In 1969, the Home and Mediterranean Fleets were amalgamated, and on shore, the great historical garrison commands of Commander-in-Chief, Portsmouth and Commander-in-Chief, Plymouth were combined in July 1969. The result was Naval Home Command.

In 1992 establishments under the command's jurisdiction included Flag Officer, Portsmouth; Flag Officer Plymouth; activities at Portland; Flag Officer Scotland and Northern Ireland; Commodore HMNB Clyde; Training; Reserves; and Chief Executive Marine Services.

In 1976 the last Admiral Commanding, Reserves hauled down his flag.

=== Chief subordinates ===
Included:

- Office of the Admiral-Superintendent, Devonport, (1969–1970)
- Senior Naval Officer, Northern Ireland (1969–1970)
- Flag Officer, Spithead (1971–1975)
- Office of the Admiral Superintendent, Portsmouth
- Flag Officer, Medway, (1969–1983)
- Flag Officer Commanding, Royal Yachts (1969–1997)
- Flag Officer, Training and Recruitment (FOTR)

Other Royal Navy shore establishments also reported to CINCNAVHOME.

=== From 1994 ===
In 1994 the post of Commander-in-Chief Naval Home Command was unified with that of the Second Sea Lord following the rationalisation of the British Armed Forces following the end of the Cold War. The staff were housed in a new Victory Building at Portsmouth. By 2006, the primary responsibility of the CNH/2SL was to maintain operational capability by providing correctly trained manpower to the fleet.

In 2012, the appointments of both remaining Commanders-in-Chief were discontinued, with full operational command being vested instead in the First Sea Lord. when the several separate existing commands were discontinued.

== Commanders-in-Chief, Naval Home Command ==
Naval Home Command
- Ministry of Defence
- Member of: Admiralty Board, Navy Board, Navy Command
- Reports to: First Sea Lord
- Nominator: Secretary of State for Defence
- Appointer: Prime Minister; Subject to formal approval by the Queen-in-Council
- Term length: Not fixed (typically 1–4 years)
- Inaugural holder: Admiral Sir John Frewen

Included:

- Admiral Sir John Frewen, 1969 – March 1970
- Admiral Sir Horace Law, March 1970 – May 1972
- Admiral Sir Andrew Lewis, May 1972 – July 1974
- Admiral Sir Derek Empson, July 1974 – November 1975
- Admiral Sir Terence Lewin, November 1975 – March 1977
- Admiral Sir David Williams, March 1977 – March 1979
- Admiral Sir Richard Clayton, March 1979 – July 1981
- Admiral Sir James Eberle, July 1981 – December 1982
- Admiral Sir Desmond Cassidi, December 1982 – October 1985
- Admiral Sir Peter Stanford, October 1985 – October 1987
- Admiral Sir John Woodward, October 1987 – October 1989
- Admiral Sir Jeremy Black, October 1989 – March 1991
- Admiral Sir John Kerr, March 1991 – March 1994

Second Sea Lord and Commander-in-Chief, Naval Home Command

- Admiral Sir Michael Layard, March 1994 – March 1995
- Admiral Sir Michael Boyce, May 1995 – September 1997
- Admiral Sir John Brigstocke, September 1997 – 2000
- Admiral Sir Peter Spencer, January 2000 – January 2003
- Admiral Sir James Burnell-Nugent, January 2003 – October 2005
- Vice-Admiral Sir Adrian Johns, October 2005 – July 2008
- Vice-Admiral Sir Alan Massey, July 2008 – July 2010
- Vice-Admiral Sir Charles Montgomery, July 2010 – October 2012

=== Chiefs of Staff, Naval Home Command ===
Included:

- Rear-Admiral Tim Lees-Spalding: June 1969 – June 1971
- Rear-Admiral Herbert Gardner: June 1971 – December 1973
- Rear-Admiral Roderick D. Macdonald: December 1973 – April 1976
- Rear-Admiral Thomas H. E. Baird: April 1976 – November 1977
- Rear-Admiral John M. H. Cox: November 1977 – July 1979
- Rear-Admiral Kenneth H.G. Willis: July 1979 – September 1981
- Rear-Admiral Trevor O.K. Spraggs: September 1981 – April 1983
- Rear-Admiral John P. Barker: April 1983 – December 1985
- Rear-Admiral Peter F. Grenier: December 1985 – April 1987
- Rear-Admiral Christopher J. Howard: April 1987 – April 1989
- Rear-Admiral James Carine: April 1989 – October 1991
- Rear-Admiral J. Robert Shiffner: October 1991 – May 1993
- Rear-Admiral Jeremy J. Blackham: May 1993 – February 1995
- Rear-Admiral Rodney B. Lees : February 1995 – January 1998
- Rear-Admiral Peter A. Dunt: January 1998 – August 2000
- Rear-Admiral Roger G. Lockwood: August 2000 – September 2002
- Rear-Admiral Richard F. Cheadle: September 2002 – December 2003
- Rear-Admiral Richard G. Melly: December 2003 – March 2005
- Rear-Admiral Michael Kimmons: March 2005 – 2008
