= Commander-in-Chief, Portsmouth =

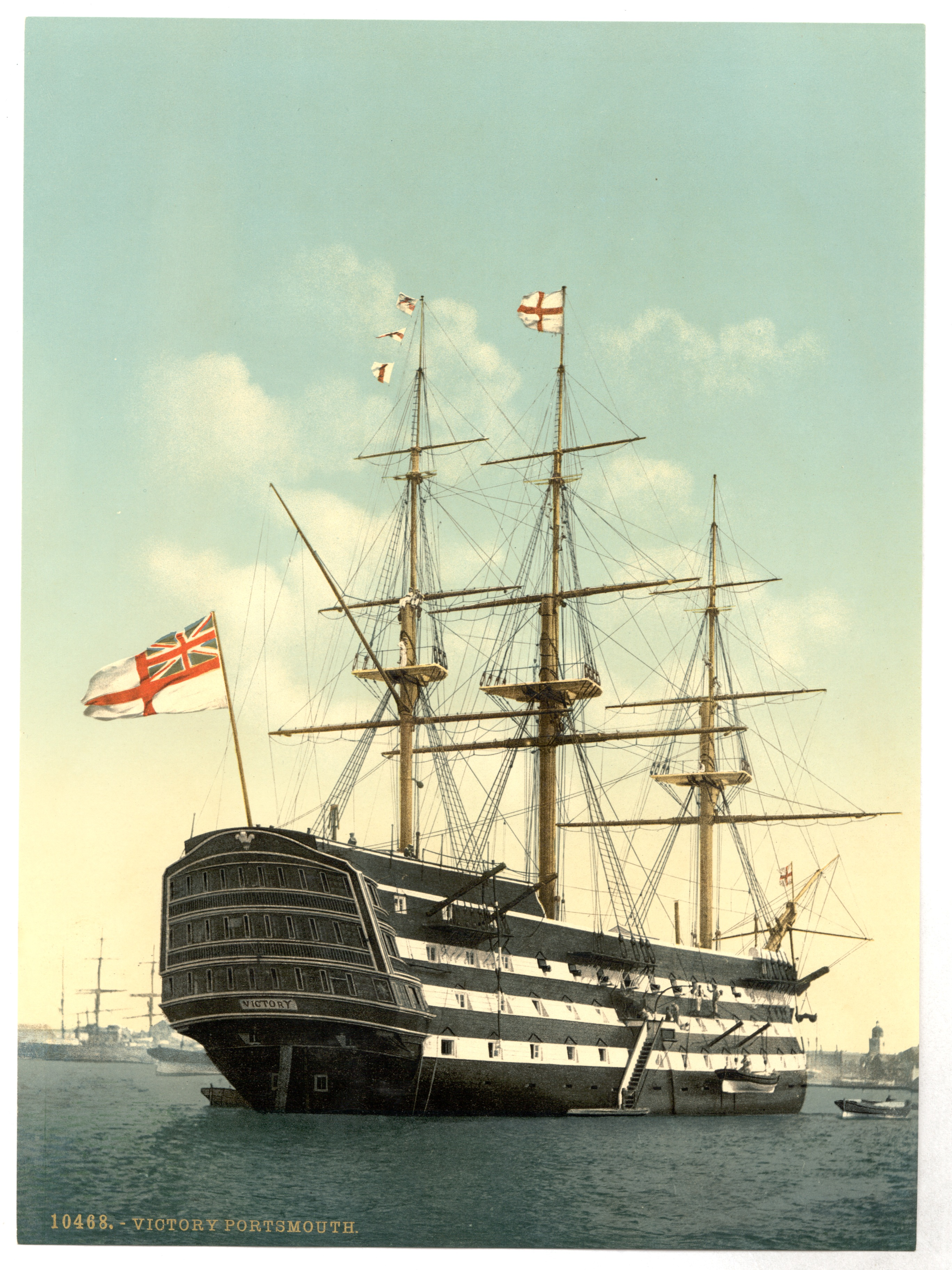
- HMS Victory, flagship of the Commander-in-Chief, Portsmouth
- Active: 1667–1969
- Country: United Kingdom
- Branch: Royal Navy
- Type: Area command
- Part of: Admiralty
- Garrison/HQ: Dockyard Commissioner's house, Portsmouth

The Commander-in-Chief, Portsmouth, was a senior commander of the Royal Navy for hundreds of years. The commanders-in-chief were based at premises in High Street, Portsmouth from the 1790s until the end of Sir Thomas Williams's tenure, his successor, Sir Philip Durham, being the first to move into Admiralty House at the Royal Navy Dockyard, where subsequent holders of the office were based until 1969. Prior to World War I the officer holder was sometimes referred to in official dispatches as the Commander-in-Chief, Spithead.

The Command extended along the south coast from Newhaven in East Sussex to Portland in Dorset. In 1889 the Commander-in-Chief took HMS Victory as his flagship.

== History ==
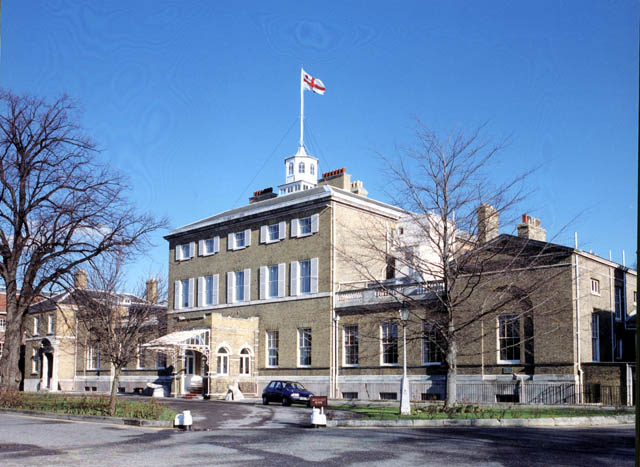
Admiralty House, HMNB Portsmouth

In the late 18th century port admirals began to reside ashore, rather than on board their flagships; the Commander-in-Chief, Portsmouth was provided with a large house at 111 High Street, which was renamed Admiralty House (and which had formerly been home to the Mayor of Portsmouth). In the 1830s Admiralty House was sold to the War Office (as Government House, it went on to house the Lieutenant-Governor of Portsmouth for the next fifty years). The Commander-in-Chief moved in turn into the former Dockyard Commissioner's house, which still stands within HMNB Portsmouth.

During the Second World War the Command Headquarters was at Fort Southwick. Rear Admiral Lancelot Holland, commanding the 3rd Battle Squadron, was briefly tasked also to command the Channel Force, operating from Portland Harbour in September-October 1939, within the Portsmouth command boundaries but responsible directly to the Admiralty. Operation Aerial, the evacuation from western French ports in 1940, was commanded by Admiral William Milbourne James, the Commander-in-Chief. James lacked the vessels necessary for convoys and organised a flow of troopships, storeships and motor vehicle vessels from Southampton, coasters to ply from Poole and the Dutch schuyts to work from Weymouth, while such warships as were available patrolled the shipping routes. Demolition parties sailed in the ships but it was hoped that supplies and equipment could be embarked as well as troops.

During World War II several subordinate commanders along the coast were appointed: Flag Officer-in-Charge Southampton, 1942-45; a Captain as Naval Officer-in-Charge Weymouth, 1941-43; Naval Officer-in-Charge Newhaven, 1942-44, held by two retired vice-admirals; and Commander C.B. Hastings RN (retired) as Naval Officer-in-Charge Poole, 1940-44. Also located at HMS Vernon for a time within the C-in-C Portsmouth's command boundaries was the Rear-Admiral in charge of the Royal Navy Coastal Forces. However operational control of the various Coastal Forces flotillas was the responsibility of the local area commander-in-chief rather than Rear-Admiral Coastal Forces. Later in the war Coastal Forces HQ was moved to North London.

In 1952 the Commander-in-Chief took up the NATO post of Commander-in-Chief, Channel (CINCHAN). This move added Allied Command Channel to the NATO Military Command Structure. The admiral commanding at Portsmouth had control naval operations in the area since 1949 under WUDO auspices.

The post of Commander-in-Chief, Portsmouth, was merged with that of Commander-in-Chief, Plymouth, in 1969 to form the post of Commander-in-Chief, Naval Home Command. The posts of Second Sea Lord and Commander-in-Chief Naval Home Command were amalgamated in 1994 following the rationalisation of the British Armed Forces following the end of the Cold War.

== Units and formations ==
Considered as the most prestigious of the home commands, the Commander-in-Chief was responsible for the central part of the English Channel between Newhaven and the Isle of Portland. Below is a list of units that served under this command.

The Commander-in-Chief had a Chief of Staff serving under him from 1832–1969.

Senior officers included:

Admiral Commanding	Date	Notes
Admiral-superintendent, Portsmouth	1832–1969	Portsmouth Dockyard. Renamed Flag Officer, Portsmouth and Admiral Superintendent
Senior Naval Officer, Portland	1908–1914	held by a Captain up-to the rank of RAdm.
Flag Officer-in-Charge Portland	1914–1958	
Commodore RN Barracks, Portsmouth	1898–1969	Possibly renamed Commander, Naval Base Portsmouth from the time Commodore Edward Ellis took command in July 1969.

=== Flotillas and squadrons ===
Included:

Naval Units	Commanded by	Date	Notes
1st Anti-Submarine Flotilla		1939–1945	
1st Destroyer Flotilla	Captain (D), 1st Destroyer Flotilla	01/1918-01/1919	
1st Destroyer Flotilla	Captain (D), 1st Destroyer Flotilla	07/1940-05/1945	
4th Destroyer Flotilla	Captain (D), 4th Destroyer Flotilla	12/1916-03/1917	
12th Destroyer Flotilla	Captain (D), 12th Destroyer Flotilla	1939-08/1940	
16th Destroyer Flotilla	Captain (D), 16th Destroyer Flotilla	1939-08/1940	
18th Destroyer Flotilla	Captain (D), 18th Destroyer Flotilla	09-10/1939	
4th Minesweeper Flotilla	Officer Commanding, 4th Minesweeper Flotilla	04/1944-12/1944	
9th Minesweeper Flotilla	Officer Commanding, 9th Minesweeper Flotilla	11/1940-05/1945	
14th Minesweeper Flotilla	Officer Commanding, 13th Minesweeper Flotilla	09/1941-12/1944	
2nd Submarine Flotilla	Officer Commanding, 2nd Submarine Flotilla	08/1914-08/1916	
3rd Submarine Flotilla	Officer Commanding, 3rd Submarine Flotilla	1919–1922	based at Gosport
5th Submarine Flotilla	Officer Commanding, 5th Submarine Flotilla	1919–1939	based at Gosport – training & reserve flotilla
6th Submarine Flotilla	Officer Commanding, 6th Submarine Flotilla	1919–1939	based at Portland – ASW training & reserve flotilla
Fishery Protection Flotilla	Officer Commanding, Fishery Protection Flotilla	1919–1927	
Fishery Protection and Minesweeping Flotilla	Captain of Fishery Protection and Minesweeping Flotilla	1923–1945	
Fishery Protection Squadron	Captain, Fishery Protection Squadron	1945–1969	
Newhaven Local Defence Flotilla	Officer Commanding, Newhaven Local Defence Flotilla	1914–1918	
Portsmouth Escort Flotilla	Officer Commanding, Portsmouth Escort Flotilla	01/1916-01/1918	renamed 1st Destroyer Flotilla
Portland Local Defence Flotilla	Officer Commanding, Portland Local Defence Flotilla	1914–1918	
Portsmouth Local Defence Flotilla	Officer Commanding, Portsmouth Local Defence Flotilla	1914–1927	

=== Shore establishments ===
Included:

Other units	Commanded by	Date	Notes
HMS Dolphin (shore establishment)		1904–1969	Royal Navy Submarine School
HMS Dryad (shore establishment)		1939–1969	Royal Navy's Maritime Warfare School
HMS Grasshopper (shore establishment)		1939–1946	Coastal forces base, Weymouth
HMS Hornet (shore establishment)		1941–1956	HQ Coastal Force
HMS Marlborough (shore establishment)		1939–1945	Torpedo school, Eastbourne
HMS Mercury (shore establishment)	Captain of Royal Navy Signals School	1941–1969	Royal Navy Signals School and Combined Signals School
HMS King Alfred (shore establishment)		1939–1946	RNVR officers training establishment- Sussex Division – Hove
Portsmouth Signal School	Captain of Portsmouth Signal School	1916–1941	
Signal School	Superintendent of Signal Schools	1901–1920	
HMS St Vincent (shore establishment)		1927–1969	Boys Training School, Gosport
HMS Sultan (1956 shore establishment)		1914–1969	Mechanical engineering school
HMS Turtle (shore establishment)		1946–?	Combined operations training establishment, based at Poole
HMS Vernon (shore establishment)		1876–1969	Torpedo and mining school

== Commanders-in-Chief ==
Post holder have included:
No = died in post

- Rear Admiral Sir Robert Holmes April 1667–October 1667
- Captain, John Graydon, January – February 1695
- Captain James Wishart, February – April 1695
- Commodore Basil Beaumont: February–March 1698
- Rear Admiral Henry Houghton: March–July 1698
- Commodore Thomas Warren: December 1698 No
- Rear Admiral James Wishart, September 1703 – October 1703
- Commodore Richard Lestock, 1741
- Admiral James Steuart: 1745–1747
- Admiral Sir Edward Hawke: 1748–1752
- Admiral Sir Edward Hawke: 1755–1756
- Admiral Henry Osborn: 1756–1757
- Admiral Sir Francis Holburne 1758–1766
- Admiral Sir John Moore: 1766–1769
- Admiral Sir Francis Geary 1769–1771
- Admiral Thomas Pye: 1771–1774
- Admiral Sir James Douglas: 1774–1777
- Admiral Thomas Pye: 1777–1783
- Admiral John Montagu: 1783–1786
- Admiral Viscount Hood: 1786–1789
- Admiral Robert Roddam: 1789–1792
- Admiral Viscount Hood: 1792–1793
- Admiral Sir Peter Parker: 1793–1799
- Admiral Mark Milbanke: 1799–1803
- Admiral Lord Gardner: March – June 1803
- Admiral Sir George Montagu: 1803–1809
- Admiral Sir Roger Curtis: 1809–1812
- Admiral Sir Richard Bickerton: 1812–1815
- Admiral Sir Edward Thornbrough: 1815–1818
- Admiral Sir George Campbell: 1818–1821 No
- Admiral Sir James Hawkins-Whitshed: 1821–1824
- Admiral Sir George Martin: 1824–1827
- Admiral Sir Robert Stopford: 1827–1830
- Admiral Sir Thomas Foley: 1830–1833 No
- Admiral Sir Thomas Williams: 1833–1836
- Admiral Sir Philip Durham: 1836 – March 1839
- Admiral Charles Elphinstone Fleeming: April – November 1839
- Admiral Sir Edward Codrington: 1839–1842
- Admiral Sir Charles Rowley: 1842–1845
- Admiral Sir Charles Ogle: 1845–1848
- Admiral Sir Thomas Capel: 1848–1851
- Admiral Sir Thomas Briggs: 1851–1852 No
- Admiral Sir Thomas Cochrane: 1852–1856
- Admiral Sir George Seymour: 1856–1859
- Admiral Sir William Bowles: 1859–1860
- Admiral Sir Henry W. Bruce: March 1860 – March 1863
- Admiral Sir Michael Seymour: March 1863 – March 1866
- Admiral Sir Thomas Pasley, Bt.: March 1866 – February 1869
- Admiral Sir James Hope: February 1869 – March 1872
- Admiral Sir Rodney Mundy: March 1872 – March 1875
- Admiral Sir George A. Elliot: March 1875 – March 1878
- Admiral Edward G Fanshawe: March 1878 – November 1879
- Admiral Alfred Ryder: November 1879 – November 1882
- Admiral Sir Geoffrey Hornby: November 1882 – November 1885
- Admiral Sir George Willes: November 1885 – June 1888
- Admiral Sir John Commerell: June 1888 – June 1891
- Admiral the Earl of Clanwilliam: June 1891 – June 1894
- Admiral Sir Nowell Salmon: June 1894 – August 1897
- Admiral Sir Michael Culme-Seymour, Bt.: August 1897 – October 1900
- Admiral Sir Charles Hotham: October 1900 – August 1903
- Admiral Sir John Fisher: August 1903 – March 1904
- Admiral Sir Archibald Douglas: March 1904 – March 1907
- Admiral Sir Day Bosanque: March 1907 – March 1908
- Admiral Sir Arthur Fanshawe: March 1908 – April 1910
- Admiral the Hon. Sir Assheton Curzon-Howe: April 1910 – March 1911 No
- Admiral Sir Arthur Moore: March 1911 – July 1912
- Admiral of the Fleet the Hon. Sir Hedworth Meux: July 1912 – March 1916
- Admiral the Hon. Sir Stanley Colville: March 1916 – March 1919
- Admiral Sir Cecil Burney: March 1919 – April 1920
- Admiral the Hon. Sir Somerset Gough-Calthorpe: April 1920 – April 1923
- Admiral Sir Sydney Fremantle: April 1923 – April 1926
- Admiral Sir Osmond Brock: April 1926 – April 1929
- Admiral of the Fleet Sir Roger Keyes, Bt.: April 1929 – May 1931
- Admiral Sir Arthur Waistell: June 1931 – January 1934
- Admiral Sir John Kelly: January 1934 – July 1936
- Admiral Sir William Fisher: July 1936 – June 1937 No
- Admiral of the Fleet The Earl of Cork and Orrery: July 1937 – June 1939
- Admiral Sir William James: June 1939 – October 1942
- Admiral Sir Charles Little: October 1942 – February 1945
- Admiral Sir Geoffrey Layton: March 1945 – May 1947
- Admiral The Lord Fraser of North Cape: May 1947 – July 1948
- Admiral of the Fleet Sir Algernon Willis: July 1948 – September 1950
- Admiral of the Fleet Sir Arthur Power: September 1950 – September 1952
- Admiral Sir John Edelsten: September 1952 – September 1954
- Admiral of the Fleet Sir George Creasy: September 1954 – July 1957
- Admiral Sir Guy Grantham: July 1957 – March 1959
- Admiral Sir Manley Power: March 1959 – October 1961
- Admiral Sir Alexander Bingley: October 1961 – February 1963
- Admiral Sir Wilfrid Woods: February 1963 – August 1965
- Admiral Sir Varyl Begg: August 1965 – March 1966
- Admiral Sir Frank Hopkins: March 1966 – November 1967
- Admiral Sir John Frewen: November 1967 – 1969
