= Edward Allin =

English shipwright

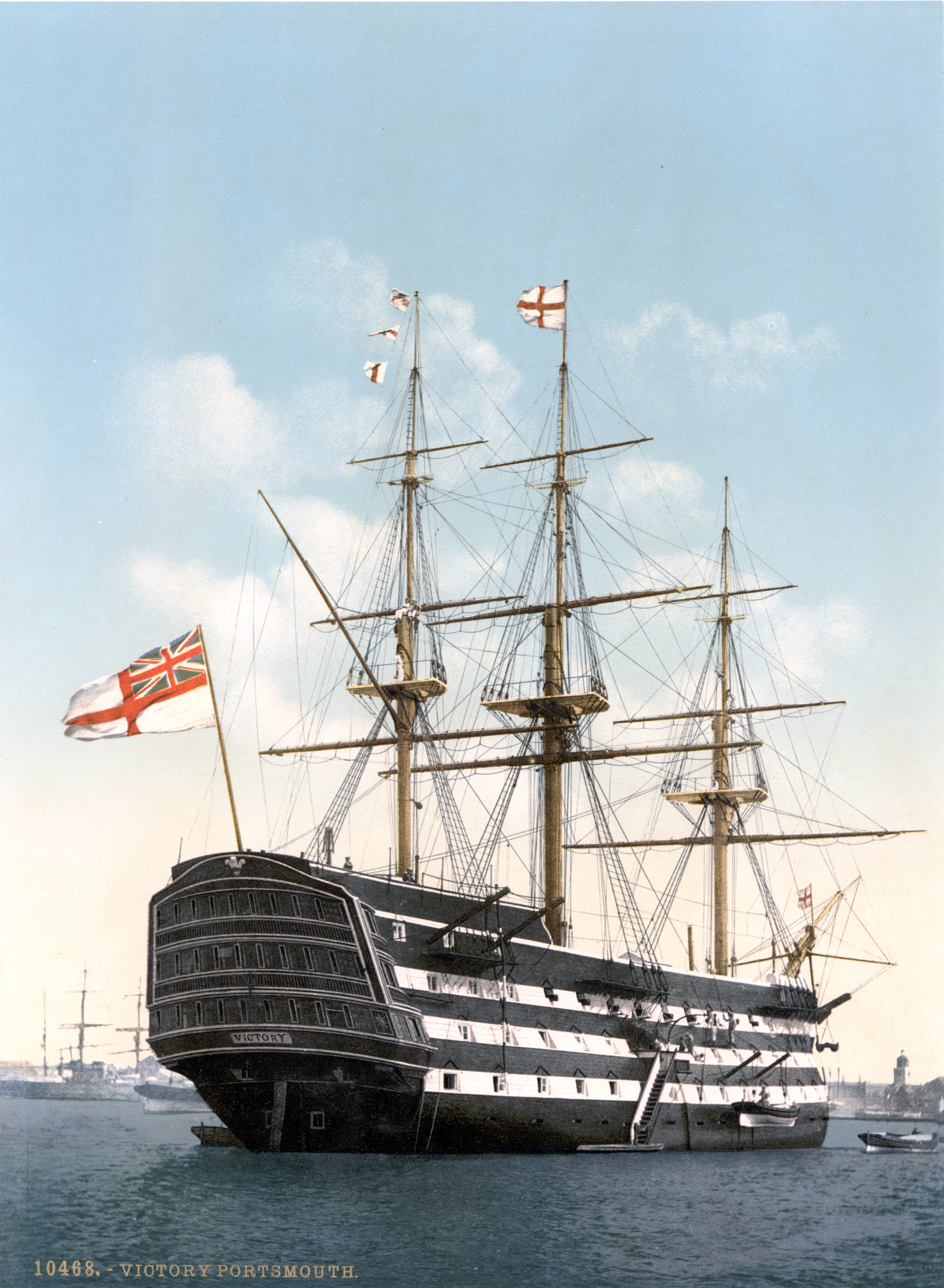
Victory at Portsmouth

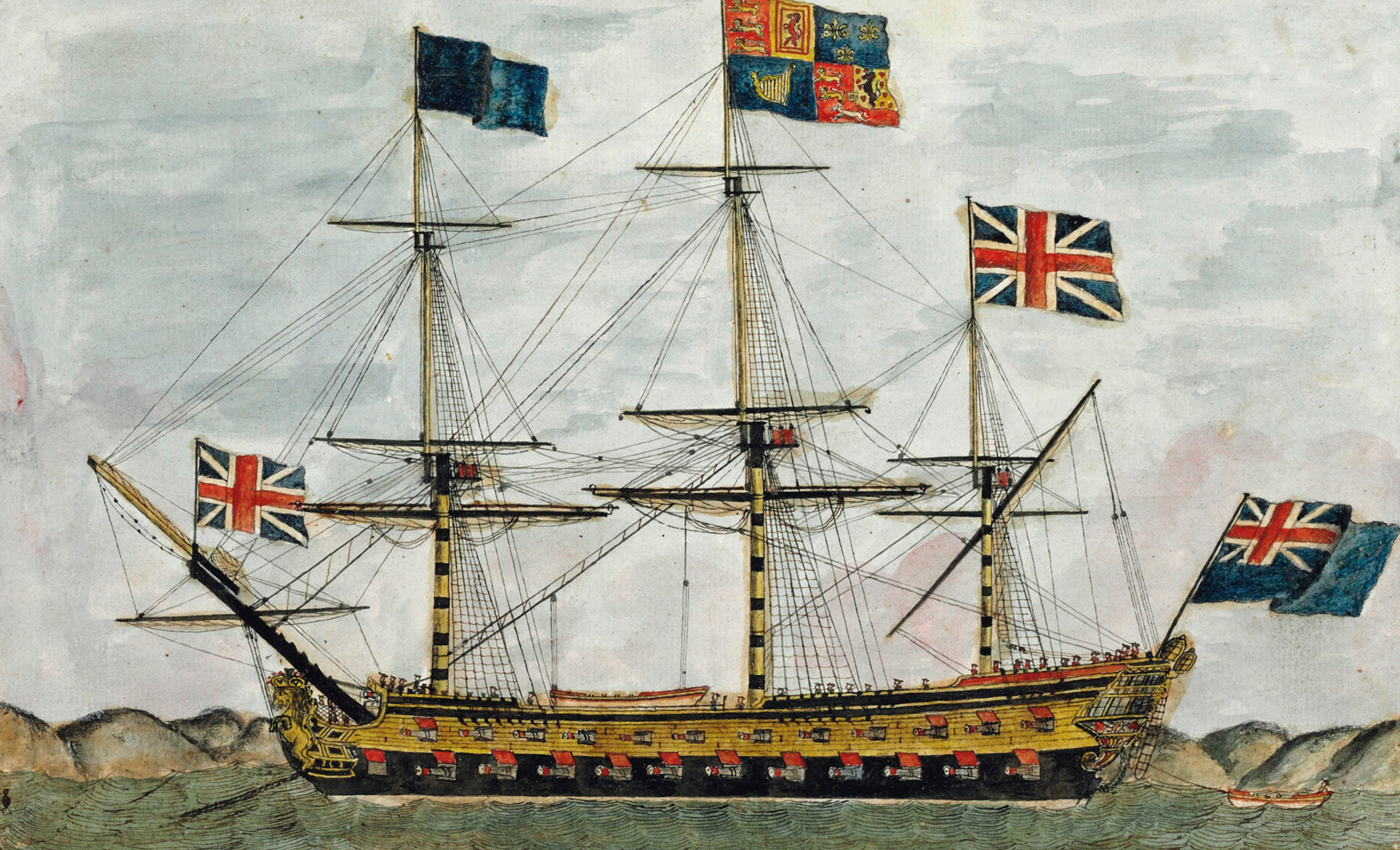
Chatham

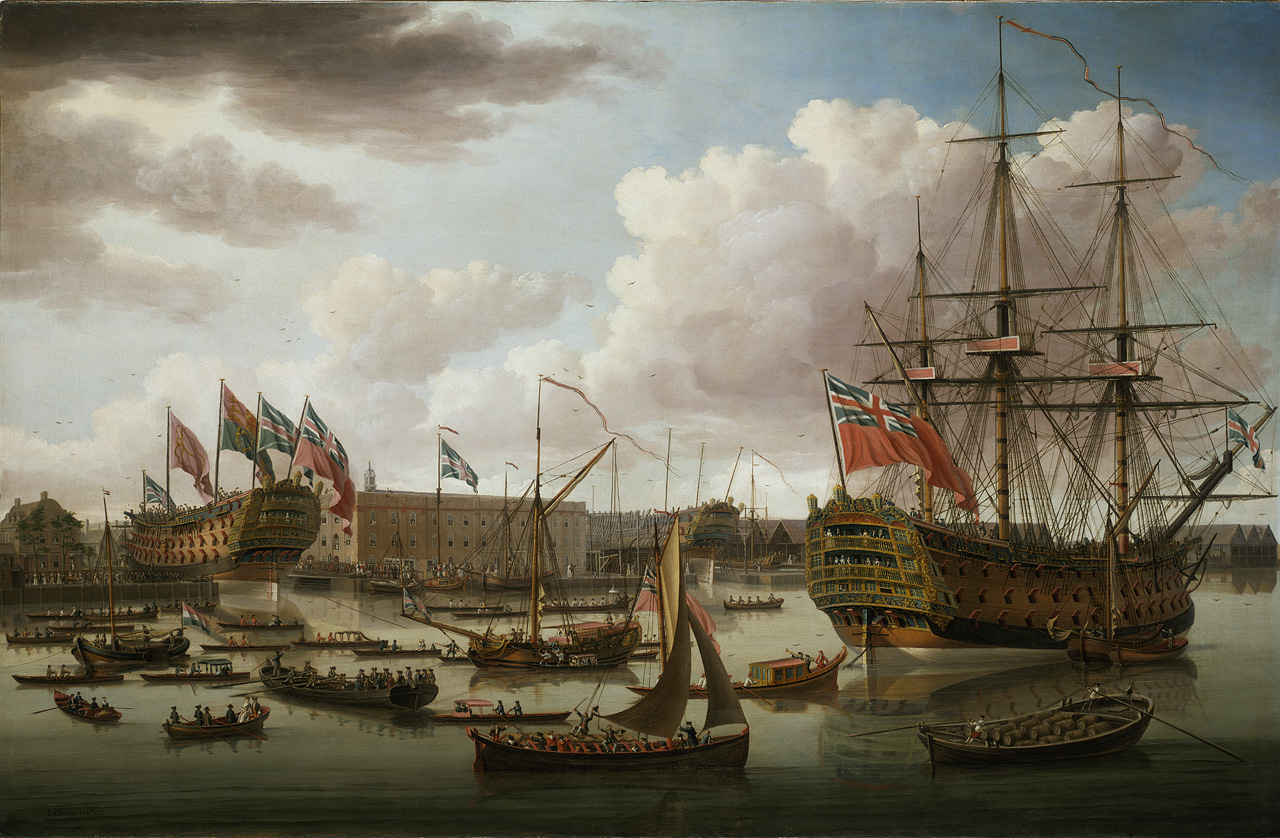
Royal George at Deptford (right)

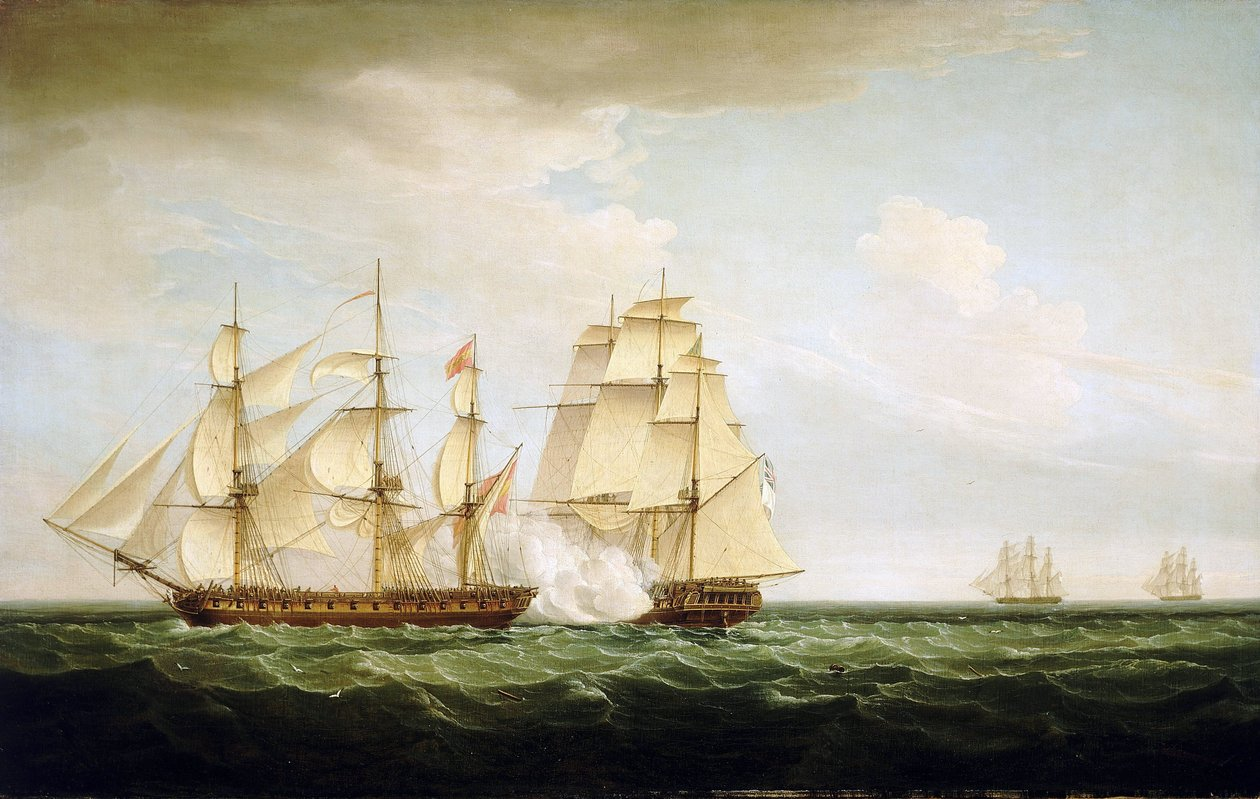
Pearl battling Santa Monica off the Azores

Edward Allin (c.1720 – 1795) was an English shipwright to the Royal Navy mainly based at Portsmouth Dockyard and Chatham Dockyard. He is most notable as the master shipwright of HMS Victory.

== Life ==
He first appears in Royal Navy records as a Master Caulker at Chatham Dockyard in 1750. In 1751 he became Assistant Master Shipwright at Woolwich Dockyard but after only a few months moved back to Chatham Dockyard. Promoted to Master Shipwright in 1752 he took over Sheerness Dockyard then Woolwich in March 1753.

In 1755 he replaced Peirson Lock as Master Shipwright of Portsmouth (Peirson had succeeded to Joseph Allin in 1742.

In 1762 he relocated to Chatham Dockyard with his role at Portsmouth being filled by Thomas Bucknall. He left Chatham in July 1767, pensioned off by the Royal Navy. Given this relatively early retiral he had possibly been injured and disabled.

He relocated to the south of Ireland around 1770 and he (or his son) was declared a Freeman of Cork on 22 April 1784.

He died in Cork in 1795.

== Ships built ==
- HMS Dunkirk 60-gun ship of the line launched at Woolwich Dockyard in 1754
- HMS Happy 8-gun sloop launched at Woolwich Dockyard in 1754
- HMS Squirrel 20-gun ship launched at Woolwich Dockyard in 1755
- HMS Dorsetshire 68-gun ship of the line launched at Portsmouth Dockyard in 1757
- HMS Chatham 50-gun ship of the line launched at Portsmouth Dockyard in 1758 (designed by his father Joseph Allin in his capacity as Surveyor to the Navy)
- HMS Pearl 32-gun frigate launched at Chatham Dockyard in 1762
- HMS Ramillies 74-gun ship of the line launched at Chatham Dockyard in 1763
- HMS Ferret 6-gun cutter launched at Chatham Dockyard in 1763
- HMS Victory 100-gun ship of the line launched at Chatham Dockyard in 1765
- HMS London 90-gun ship of the line launched at Chatham Dockyard in 1766

== Ships designed ==
- HMS Royal George
- HMS Montagu designed in 1751
