= HMS Victory =

1765 first-rate ship of the line of the Royal Navy

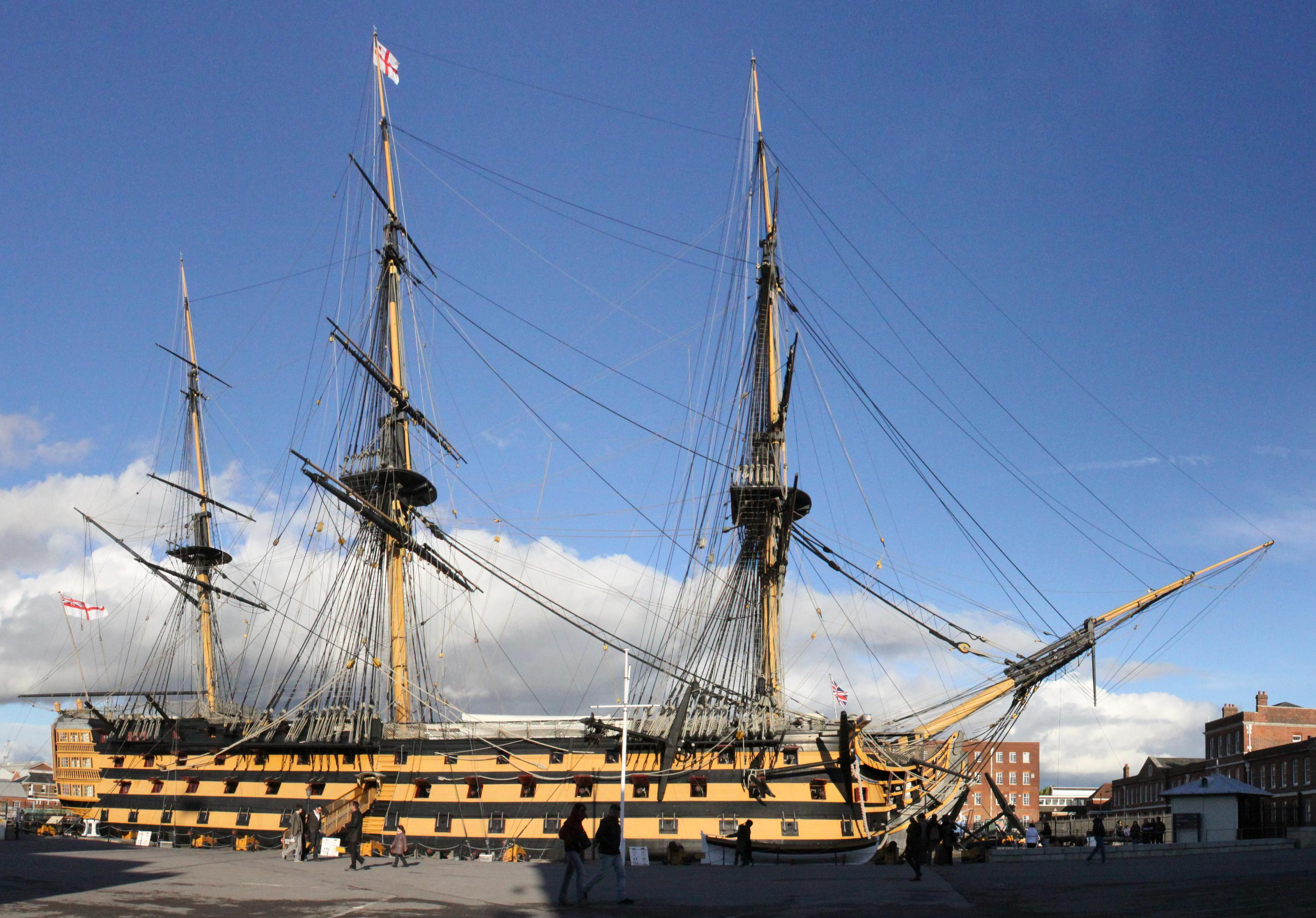
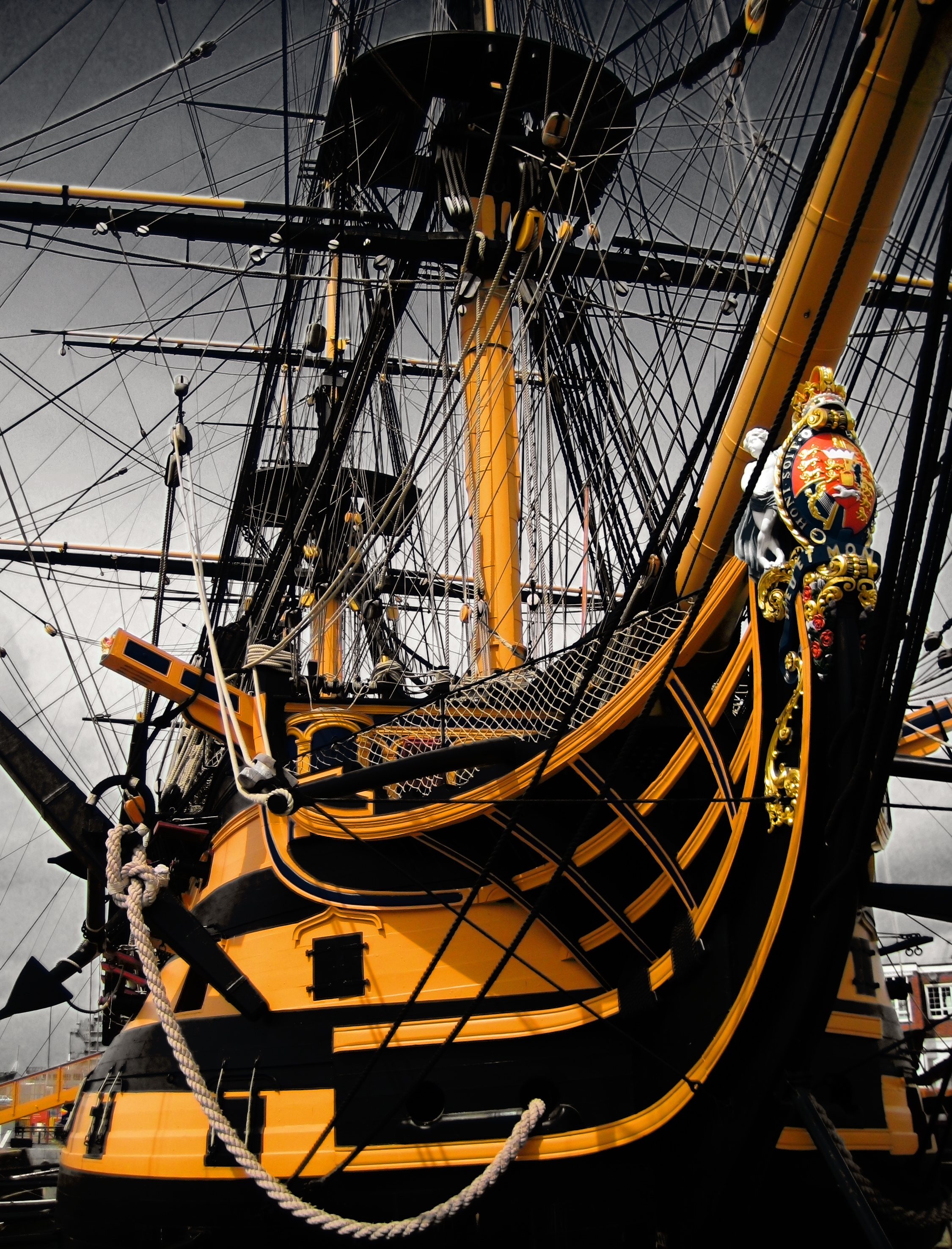
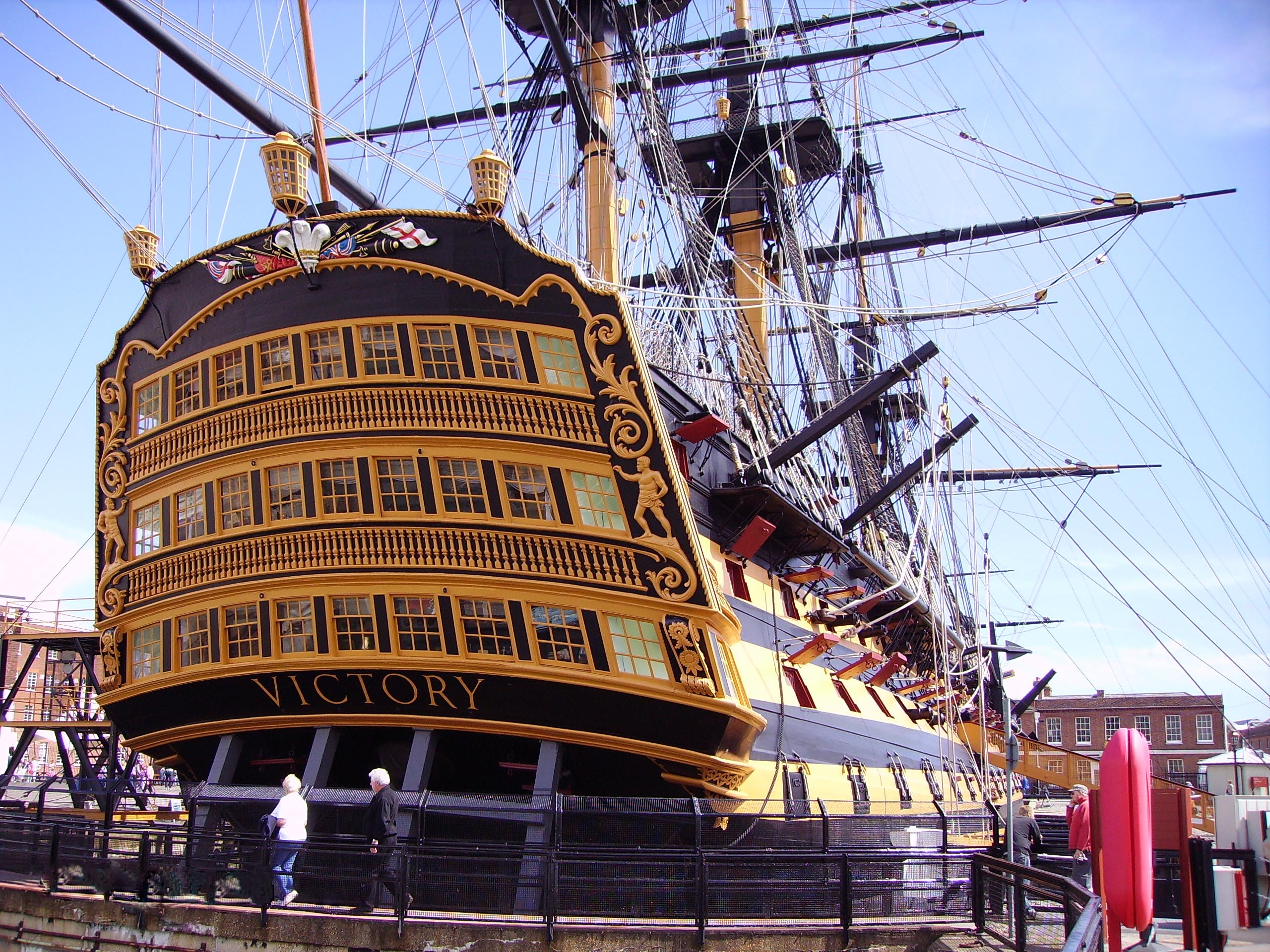
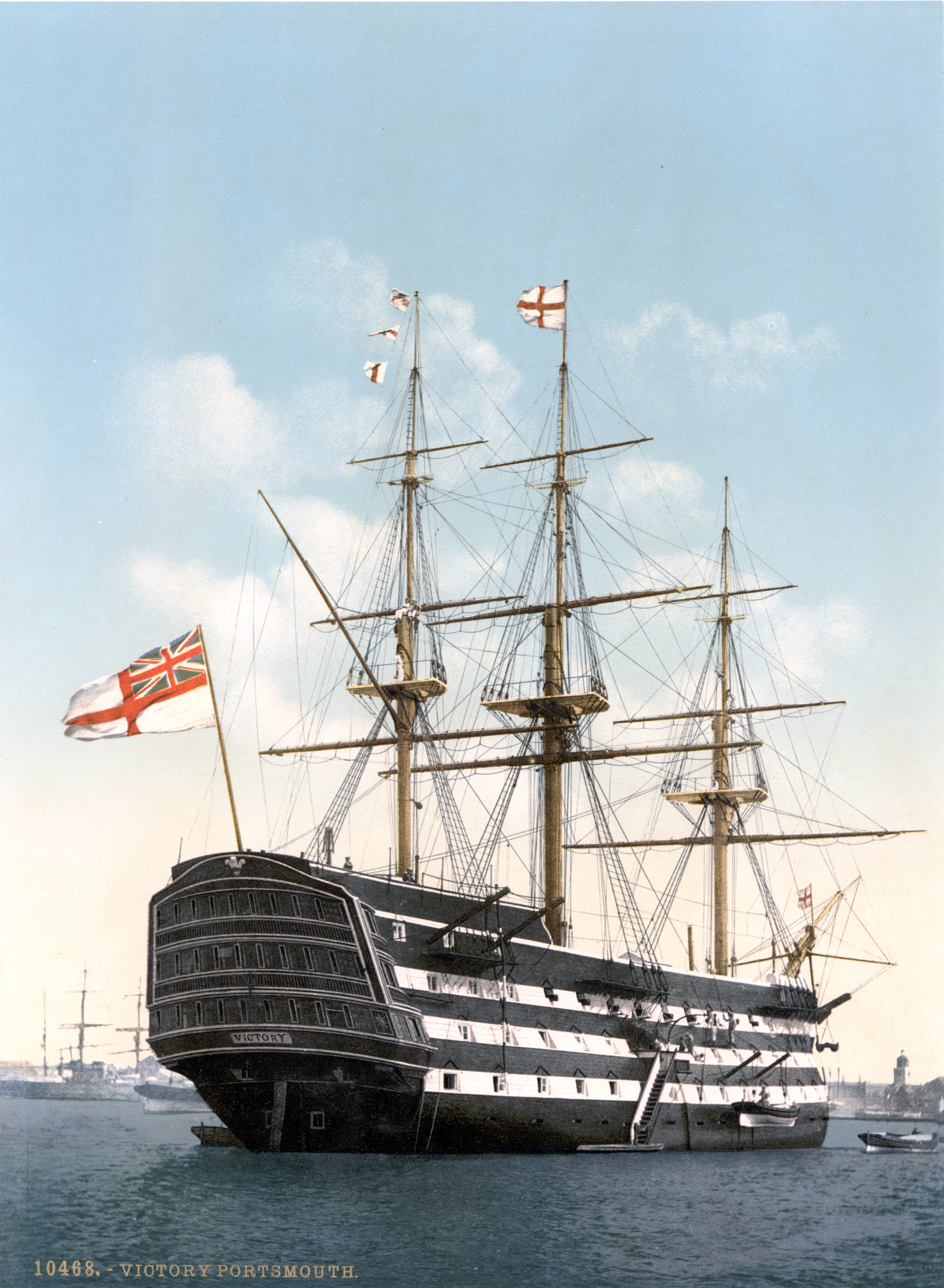
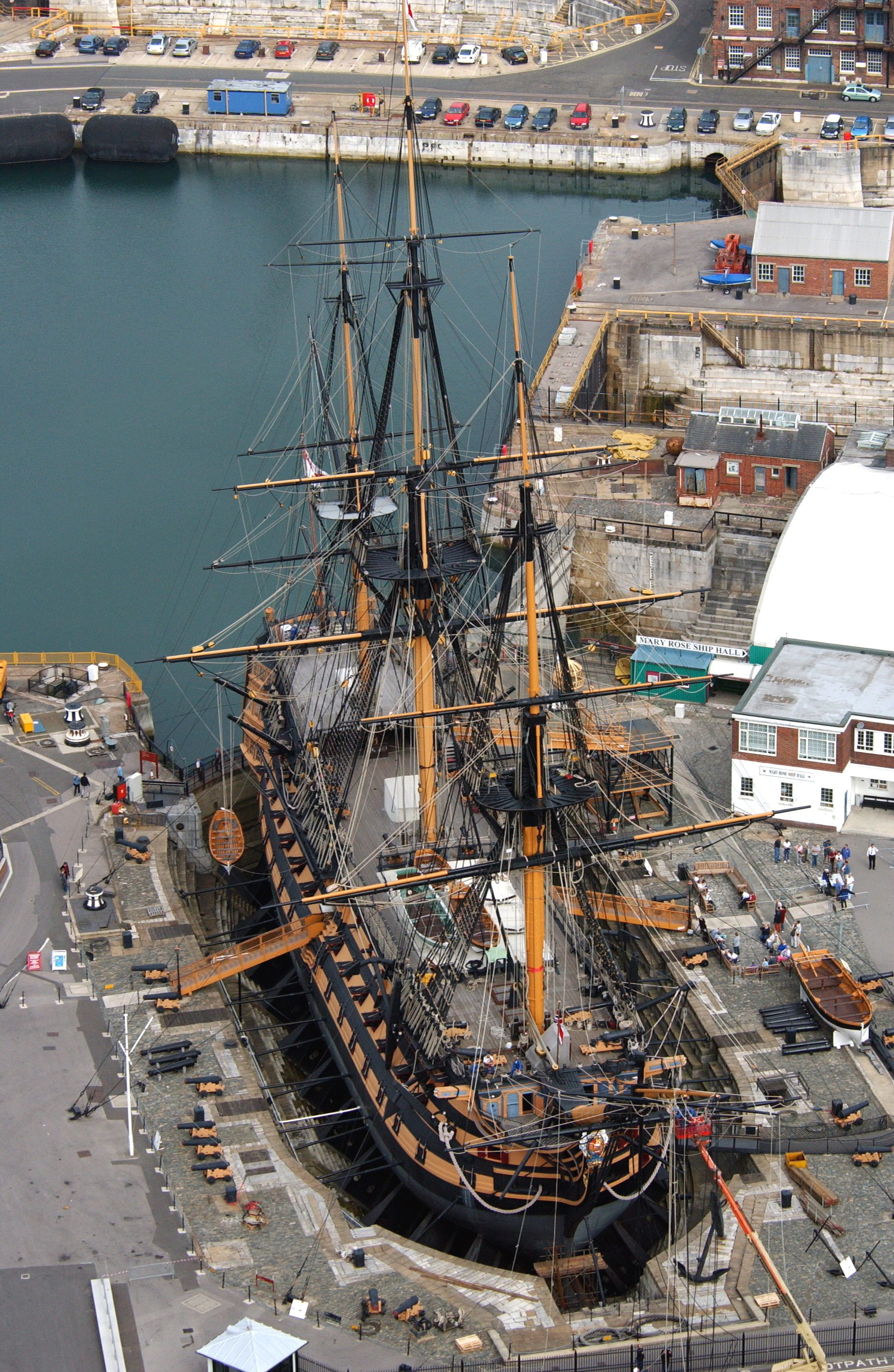
- Clockwise from top: HMS Victory at Portsmouth Historic Dockyard, view of the ship's stern, Bird's-eye view of Victory in 2004, on harbour service circa 1900, view of the bow.

History

United Kingdom
- Name: HMS Victory
- Ordered: 14 July 1758
- Builder: Chatham Dockyard
- Laid down: 23 July 1759
- Launched: 7 May 1765; 261 years ago
- Commissioned: March 1778
- In service: 248 years
- Home port: Portsmouth Historic Dockyard, England; 50°48′07″N 1°06′35″W
- Honours and awards: Participated in: First Battle of Ushant (1778); Second Battle of Ushant (1781); Great Siege of Gibraltar (1779–1783); Battle of Cape Spartel (1782); Battle of the Hyères Islands (1795); Battle of Cape St Vincent (1797); Trafalgar campaign (1805); Battle of Trafalgar (1805)
- Status: Active; Flagship of the First Sea Lord

General characteristics
- Class & type: 104-gun first-rate ship of the line
- Displacement: 3,500 long tons (3,600 tonnes)
- Tons burthen: 2,142 bm
- Length: 186 ft (57 m) (gundeck), 227 ft 6 in (69.34 m) (overall)
- Beam: 51 ft 10 in (15.80 m)
- Draught: 28 ft 9 in (8.76 m)
- Depth of hold: 21 ft 6 in (6.55 m)
- Propulsion: Sails—6,510 sq yd (5,440 m^{2})
- Sail plan: Full-rigged ship
- Speed: up to 11 knots (20 km/h)
- Complement: Approximately 850
- Armament: Trafalgar: Gundeck: 30 × 2.75-ton long pattern Blomefield 32-pounders (15 kg); Middle gundeck: 28 × 2.5-ton long 24-pounders (11 kg); Upper gundeck: 30 × 1.7-ton short 12-pounders (5 kg); Quarterdeck: 12 × 1.7-ton short 12-pounder (5 kg); Forecastle: 2 × medium 12-pounder (5 kg), 2 × 68-pounder (31 kg) carronade
- Notes: Height from waterline to top of mainmast: 205 ft (62.5 m)

HMS Victory is a 104-gun first-rate wooden sailing ship of the line, best known for her role as Admiral Horatio Nelson's flagship during the Battle of Trafalgar in 1805. With 248 years of service as of 2026, she is the world's oldest naval vessel still in commission. (Note: USS Constitution is 30 years younger. She is often referred to as the "oldest commissioned warship still afloat" because she is maintained in sailing trim; Victory is kept in dry dock.)

She was ordered for the Royal Navy in 1758, during the Seven Years' War, and laid down in 1759. A series of British naval victories meant there was no urgency to complete the ship and the signing of the Treaty of Paris in February 1763 meant that when Victory was finally floated out in 1765, she was placed in ordinary. Victory was first commissioned in March 1778 during the American Revolutionary War, seeing action at the First Battle of Ushant in 1778, shortly after France had openly declared her support for Britain's rebel colonies in North America, and the Second Battle of Ushant in 1781. The following year, Victory took part in the relief of Gibraltar and the Battle of Cape Spartel before hostilities ended in 1783 and she was placed in ordinary once more.

In 1787, Victory was ordered to be fitted for sea following a revolt in the Netherlands but the threat had subsided before the work had been completed. She was ready for the Nootka Crisis and Russian Armament in 1790 but both events were settled before she was called into action. During the French Revolutionary War, Victory served in the Mediterranean Fleet, co-operating in the occupation of Toulon in August and the Invasion of Corsica between February and August 1794. She was at the Battle of the Hyeres Islands in 1795 and the Battle of Cape St Vincent in 1797. When Admiral Nelson was appointed Commander-in-Chief of the Mediterranean Fleet in 1803, he hoisted his flag aboard Victory and in 1805 took her into action at the Battle of Trafalgar.

Victory served as a harbour ship from 1824 until 1922, when she was placed in dry dock at Portsmouth, England. Here she was repaired and is now maintained as a museum ship. From October 2012 Victory has been the flagship of the First Sea Lord.

== Design, construction and armament ==
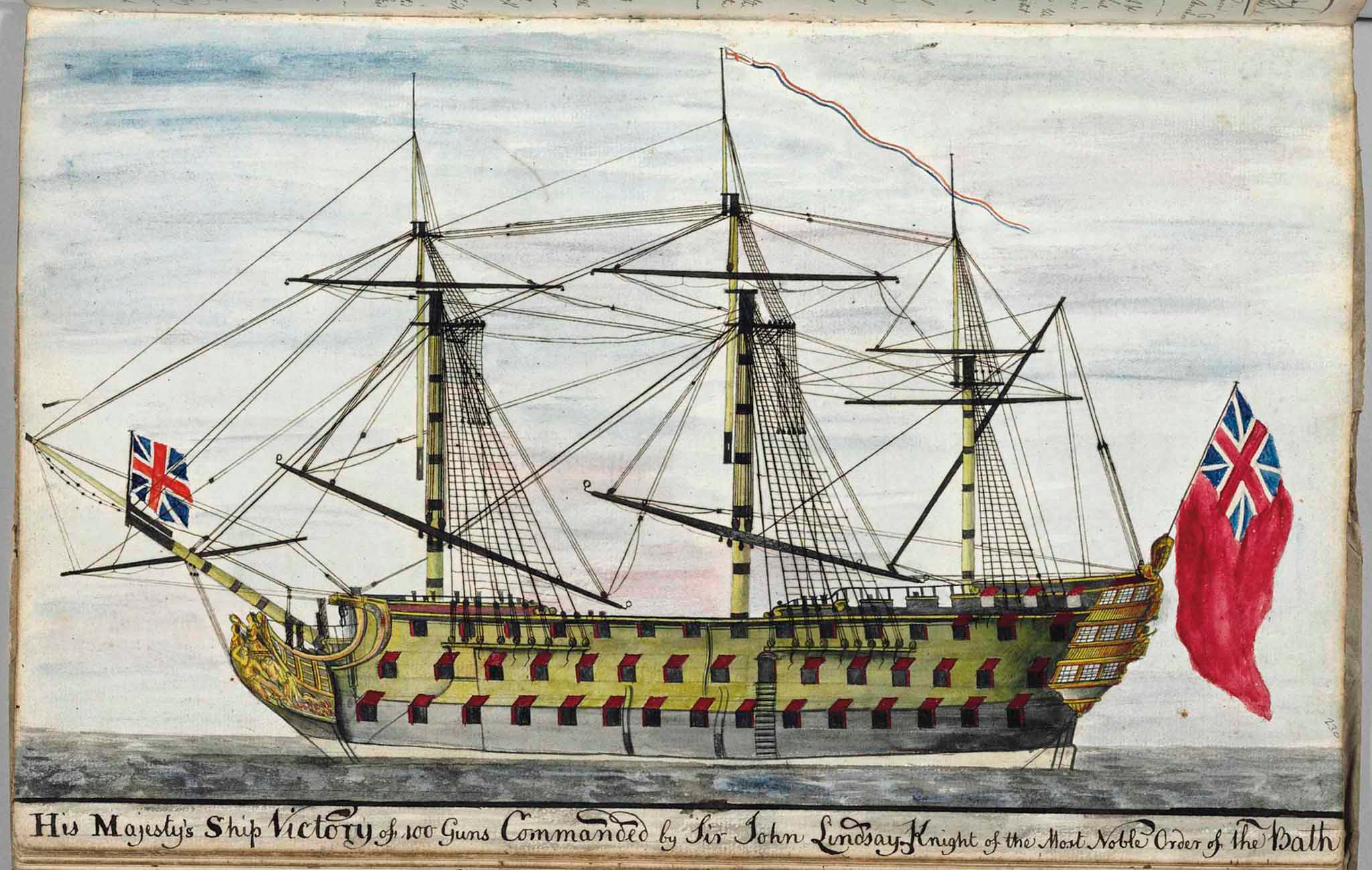
1778 illustration of Victory

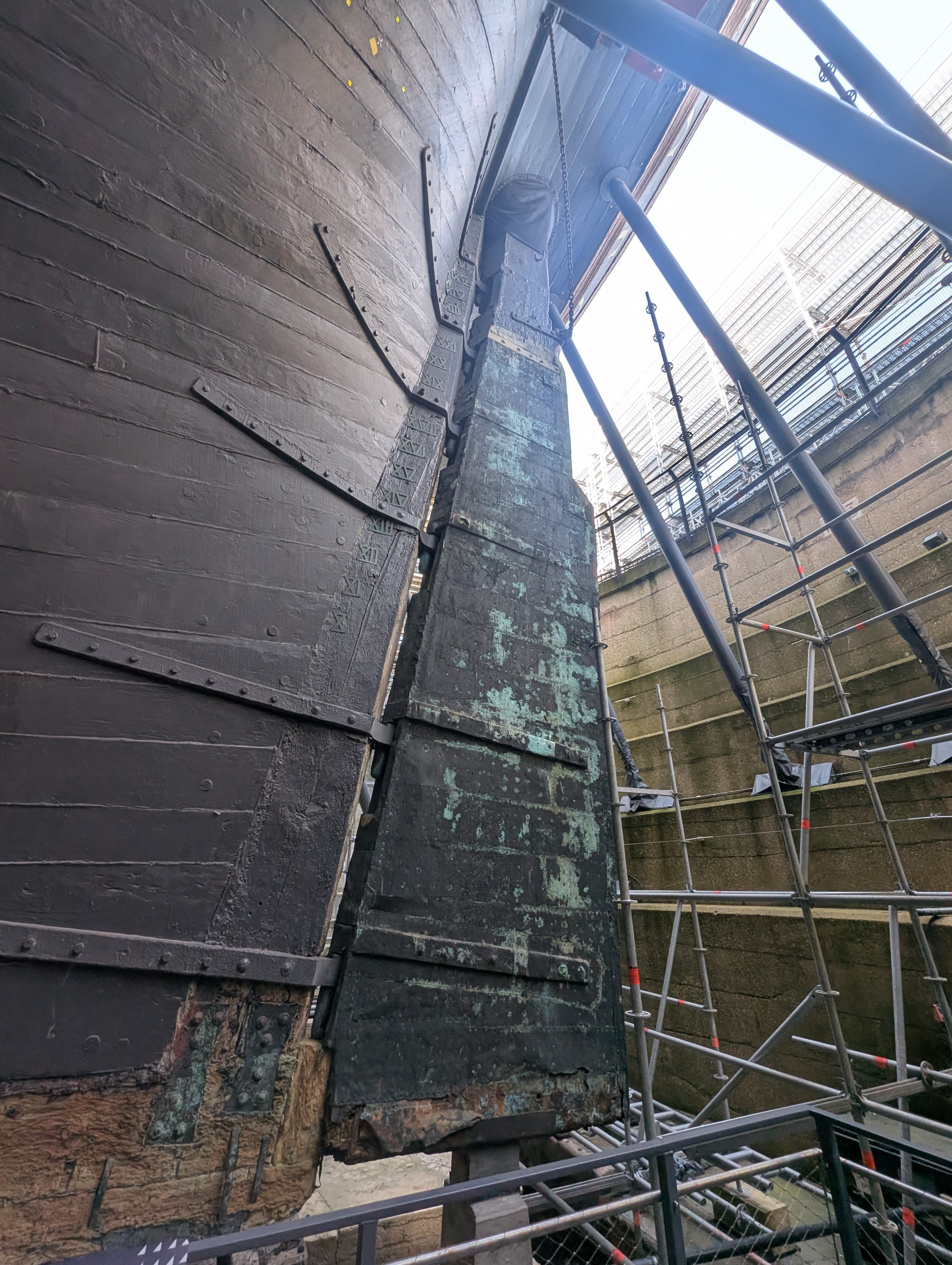
The original rudder of Victory

In December 1758, the British Prime Minister, William Pitt the Elder, requested the building of 12 ships and within a matter of days, orders were received at Chatham Dockyard to start work on a first-rate ship-of-the-line as soon as a dry dock was available. Ships-of-the-line of this period were three-masted, fully-rigged vessels that were strong enough and powerful enough to operate in the line of battle, and first rates were the most formidable, carrying 100 or more cannon on three continuous gun decks.

Sir Thomas Slade, naval architect and Surveyor of the Navy was selected to design the ship, the lines of which were copied from HMS Royal George of 100 guns, built at Woolwich Dockyard three years earlier. The master shipwright in charge of construction at Chatham was John Lock but following his death in 1762, the position passed to Edward Allin, son of Sir Joseph Allin, former Surveyor of the Navy. The keel was laid on 23 July 1759 in the Old Single Dock (since renamed No. 2 Dock and now Victory Dock), and the name Victory was chosen in October 1760.

The Seven Years' War had been going badly for Britain until 1759, when battles were won at Quebec, Minden, Lagos and Quiberon Bay. It was the Annus Mirabilis, or Wonderful Year, and the victories may have been in mind when the ship's name was selected. Alternatively, it may have been determined because Victory was the only name not in use of the seven shortlisted. There were reservations as to whether the choice was appropriate as the previous ship of that name had been lost with all hands in 1744.

Around 6,000 trees provided the timber for the ship and 150 men were required to assemble her. Of the wood used in her construction, 90% was oak and the remainder elm, pine and fir, together with a small quantity of lignum vitae. Six-foot copper bolts were employed to hold the frame together, supported by treenails for the smaller fittings. As built, she measured 186 feet 0 inches (56.7 metres) along the gun deck, 152 ft 6 5/8 in (46.5 m) at the keel, with a beam of 51 ft 7 1/2 in (15.7 m) and a depth in hold of 21 ft 6 in (6.55 m). This made her 2,16253/94 tons (bm) and she displaced 3,500 long tons (3,560 tonnes).

Once built, it was normal to cover the frame and leave it for several months to allow the wood to dry out or "season". French naval power had been severely weakened by the events in Quiberon Bay however and there was no immediate need for Victory which was left for nearly three years. This additional seasoning had a beneficial effect on her subsequent longevity. Work restarted in autumn 1763 and she was floated on 7 May 1765, having cost £57,748.1.7d. During the 18th century, Victory was one of ten first-rate ships to be constructed.

When the time came to move Victory out of dock, shipwright Hartly Larkin designated "foreman afloat" for the event, noticed the ship appeared too wide to pass through the gates. Measurements confirmed the gap to be at least 9½ inches too narrow. Larkin's superior, Allin, considered abandoning the launch but Larkin enlisted the help of all the available shipwrights who, with their adzes were able to remove sufficient wood from the dock gates to allow the ship through. Once afloat a number of issues became apparent: A distinct list to starboard was corrected with the addition and redistribution of ballast to bring her upright but this exacerbated an existing and altogether more serious problem; the tendency for her to sit heavily in the water such that her lower deck gunports were only 4 ft 6 in (1.4 m) above the waterline. The latter could not be rectified so Victory's sailing instructions noted that during rough weather the gunports should remain closed. This had potential to limit Victory's firepower, though in practice none of her subsequent actions would be fought in rough seas.

Because the war with France had come to an end, there was no need for a strong naval presence at sea and Victory was taken down the River Medway where she was placed in ordinary. Over the following four years, she was fitted out at a further cost of £5,426.1.5d and took part in sea trials. Once rigged, Victory stood 205 ft (62.5 m) tall, from the waterline to the top of her mainmast. Powered by up to 37 sails, the maximum that could be set at any one time, with a combined surface area of 5468 square metres (6510 square yards), she could achieve 11 knots (12.5 miles per hour or 20.1 kilometres per hour), averaging 7-8 knots in a topgallant gale. (Note: The strongest wind in which a ship can safely carry her topgallant sails; Equivalent to force 6-7 on the Beaufort Scale.) When victualled and stored for six months service, Victory drew 24 ft 3 in (7.39 m) at the bow and 25 ft 6 in (7.77 m) at the stern. Fully manned, she would carry a complement of 850 men. At the conclusion of the trials in 1769, the ship was returned to her mooring.

Despite the outbreak of the American War of Independence in 1776, Victory remained in the Medway; she was too large to operate in the shallow waters around North America and it was reasoned that, because the Americans had no battle fleet of their own, there were sufficient British ships in service. The situation changed in 1778 when France entered the war with its powerful navy. Victory was armed with a full complement of smoothbore, cast iron cannon and mobilised for use in the Channel.

=== Armament ===
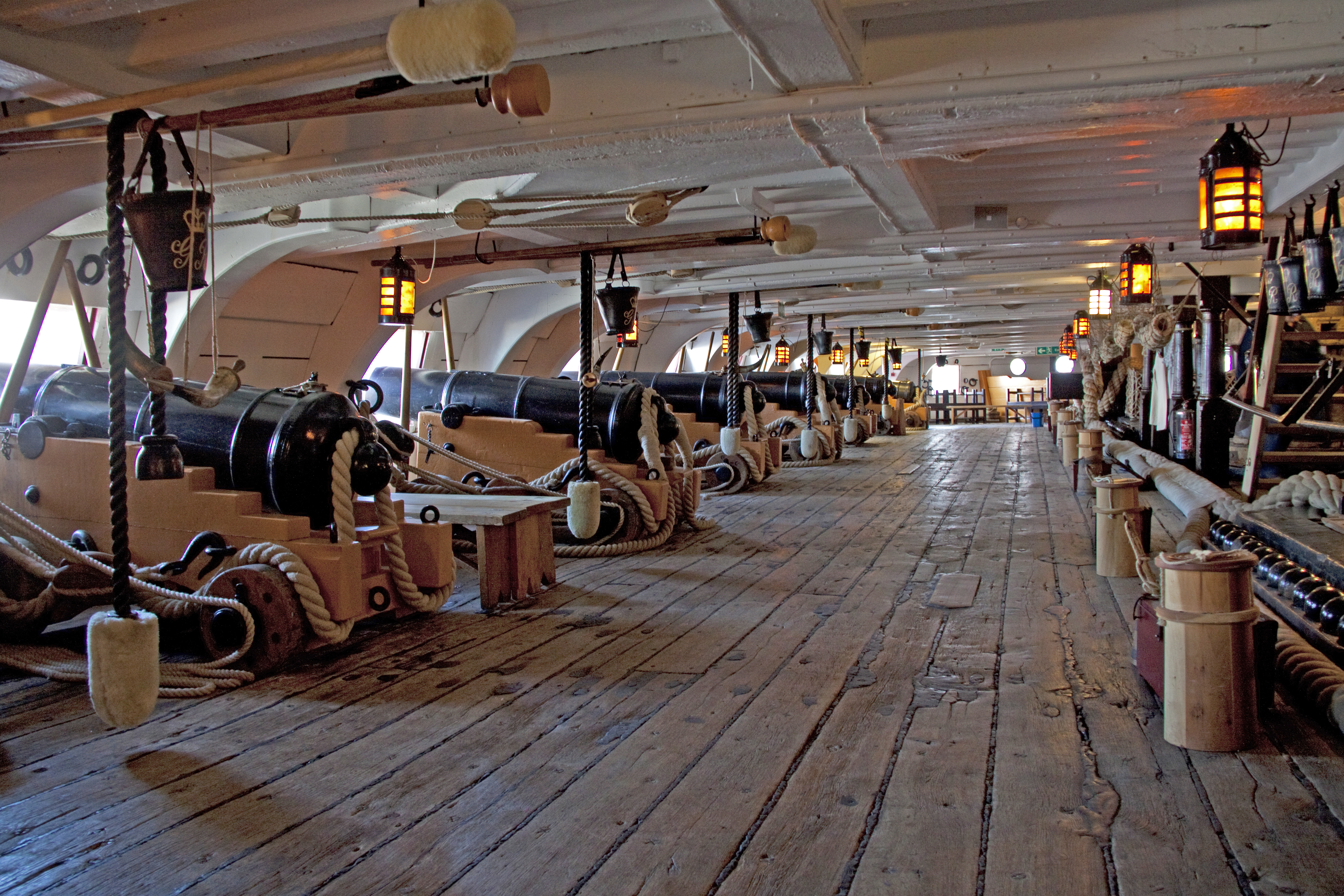
Replica 32-pound cannon on Victory's lower gun deck

Slade designed Victory as, nominally, a 100-gun ship. (Note: The gun-rating of a vessel was the number of long guns it was designed to carry and did not always match its actual armament. Before 1817, carronades were not counted at all unless they were direct replacements for long guns.) When she was first commissioned, she carried ten 6-pounder (2.7 kg) guns on the quarterdeck and two on the forecastle, thirty 12-pounder (5.4 kg) guns on the upper deck, twenty-eight 24-pounder (11 kg) guns on the middle deck and thirty 42-pounder (19 kg) guns on the lower deck, but her ordnance changed a number of times during her career, both in terms of the number guns and the calibre. When Admiral Augustus Keppel chose Victory as his flagship in May 1778, he ordered the 42-pounders be swapped with lighter 32-pound guns, believing the marginal loss of power was more than offset by the increased manoeuvrability and thus faster rate of fire. Later, in April 1779, after Keppel had been replaced, the 42-pounders were reinstated, but following Vice-Admiral Horatio Nelson's appointment in 1803, Victory reverted to carrying 32-pounders once more. (Note: Many flag officers of note, including Samuel Hood, Richard Howe and John Jervis, preferred the heavier gun.)

Victory's armament was slightly upgraded in 1783 with the replacement of the 6-pounders on her upperworks with 12-pounder cannon, and the addition of two carronade guns, firing 68-lb (31 kg) round shot, to the quarterdeck. She carried this higher rated armament on her upperworks, plus two additional 12-pounders on the quarterdeck, when she fought at the Battle of Trafalgar, along with the thirty 32-pounders on the lower deck, twenty-eight 24-pounder guns on the middle deck, and thirty 12-pounders on the upper deck; 104 guns in total. There was also a single 18-pounder (8.2 kg) slide-mounted carronade that was kept in the hold for use in boat actions. During a refit in 1806, the 24-pound guns on the middle deck were swapped for 18-pounders. These were removed in 1828 to make way for short 24-pounders while, at the same time, the guns on the upper deck were replaced with cannon of the same calibre but a much longer barrel of 9 feet (2.7 m).

== Early service ==
=== First Battle of Ushant ===
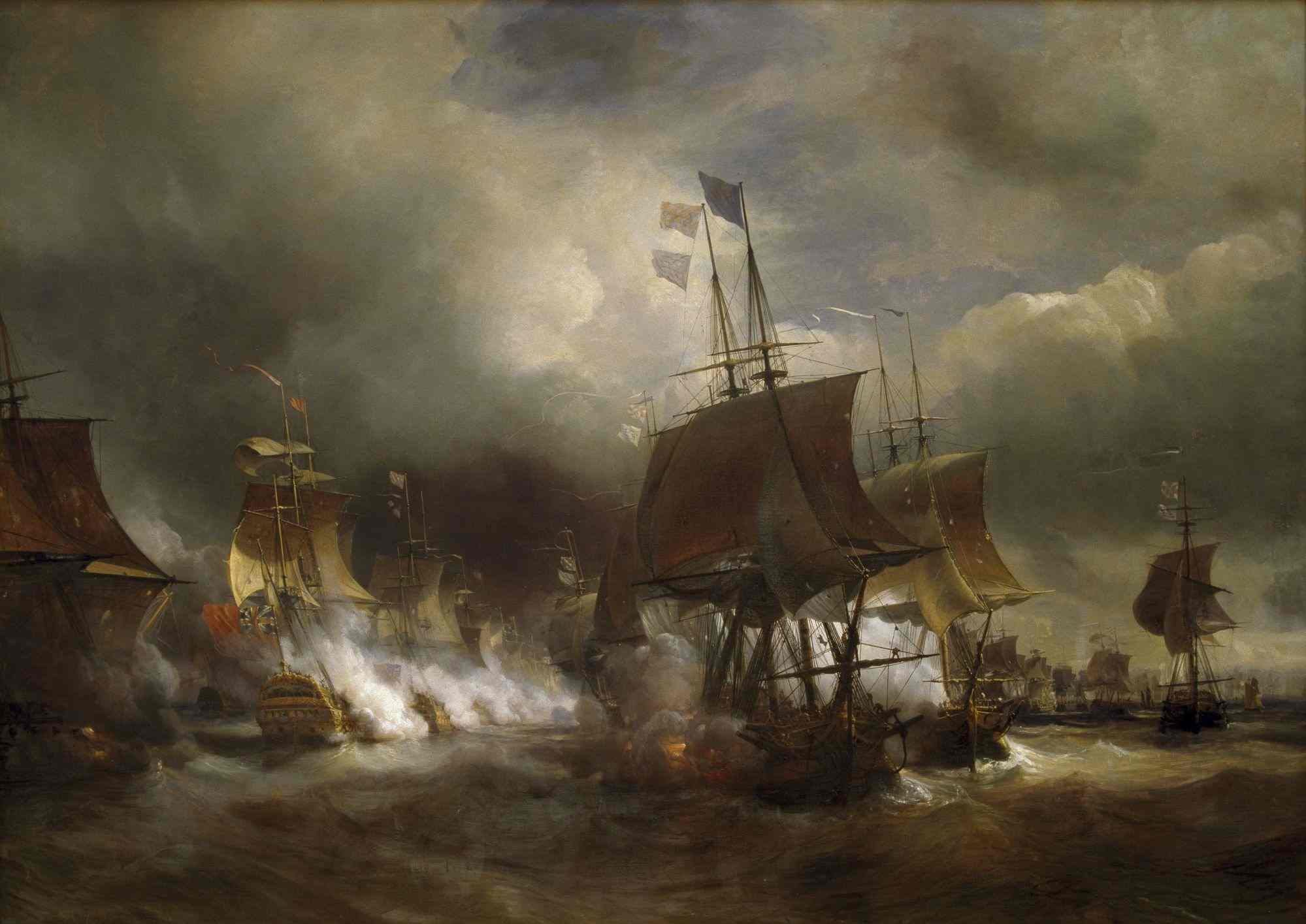
The first battle of Ushant (1778) by Theodore Gudin. Admiral Keppel was later court martialled for allowing the French fleet to escape but was acquitted.

Victory was first commissioned in March 1778 under Captain Sir John Lindsay. Being appointed only to oversee fitting out and delivery of the ship to Portsmouth, he held that position until May 1778, when Admiral Augustus Keppel hoisted his flag and selected Rear Admiral John Campbell and Captain Jonathan Faulknor as his first and second captains respectively. (Note: A temporary rank between admiral and captain, the first captain functioned mainly as chief of staff. He was senior to all other captains under the command of the admiral and was afforded the rights, pay and privileges of a rear admiral (the least senior of the rank). Because of this, it was not unusual for a high-ranking admiral to assign a rear admiral to the position. On the appointment of a first captain, the captain of the flagship (flag captain) would be designated second captain.) Keppel put to sea from Spithead on 9 July 1778 with around twenty-nine ships-of-the-line and, on 23 July, encountered a French force of more or less equal size and strength, some miles west of Ushant. The French admiral, Louis Guillouet, comte d'Orvilliers, who had been instructed to avoid conflict, was prevented from putting into Brest, but retained the weather gage. Manoeuvring was hampered by constantly shifting winds and driving rain, but eventually a battle became inevitable, with the British arranged roughly in a column. The French were less organised but managed to pass along the British line with their leading ships. At about 11:45, Victory opened fire on the Bretagne of 110 guns, which was being followed by Ville de Paris of 90 guns. The British van avoided significant damage, but Sir Hugh Palliser's rear division was badly mauled. Keppel ordered a pursuit, but Palliser did not conform, and the action was not resumed.

Both Keppel and Palliser were court-martialled and cleared of any wrongdoing but Keppel refused to serve again and Palliser, who had been somewhat criticised at his hearing, was not considered a prudent appointment by the Admiralty. Short of commanders, Sir Charles Hardy was forced out of retirement to take charge of the Channel Fleet. With Rear Admiral Richard Kempenfelt as his Captain of the Fleet, Hardy raised his flag aboard Victory in the March following.

In April, Spain agreed to aid France in the conflict with the signing of the Treaty of Aranjuez and then, on 21 June, openly declared war on Britain. On the same day, Hardy assembled his officers on Victory to give them the news. The Royal Navy was now hugely outnumbered by the combined enemy fleets and the long-planned invasion of England was now a real possibility. Lacking any real strategy, Hardy's fleet patrolled the western entrance to the Channel for any sign of the enemy. In August, a Franco-Spanish fleet of 66 ships appeared off Plymouth. Hardy had his 35 ships form line of battle but was reluctant to attack such a large force and after several days the enemy left without taking any action.

=== Second Battle of Ushant ===
In March 1780, Victory was brought into Portsmouth for a refit during which she was coppered. The process involved the fixing of 3,923 sheets of copper to her hull below the waterline to protect her against shipworm and to improve performance by inhibiting the build up of algae and marine animals. The ship was back at sea by 2 December 1781, under the commanded of Captain Henry Cromwell and bearing Kempenfelt's flag. On learning that a French convoy had left Brest on 10 December, Kempenfelt ordered his fleet, comprising Victory, eleven other ships of the line, a 50-gun fourth-rate, and five frigates to intercept. The British sighted the convoy on 12 December and attacked, unaware it was protected by twenty-one ships-of-the-line under the command of Luc Urbain de Bouexic, comte de Guichen. When Kempenfelt realised he was outgunned, he retired but not before capturing fifteen sail of the convoy. The remaining French ships were scattered by strong winds and forced to return home.

=== Siege of Gibraltar ===
Contemporary painting by Richard Paton showing Victory (centre) at the relief of Gibraltar in 1782

In October 1782, Victory was the flagship of Admiral Richard Howe who had been charged with providing a powerful escort for a convoy of transports carrying supplies to Gibraltar. When Victory reached Cape St Vincent on 8 October, Howe had one of his frigates sail ahead. She returned on 10 October and reported that Gibraltar was still in British hands, having survived an attack the previous month. A storm broke out that night which continued into the next morning. As the convoy approached its destination, Howe had his ships-of-the-line arranged in two columns with Victory leading but the blockading fleet did not come out to meet them and instead remained riding the storm out at anchor. Despite Howe's warnings and guidance on how to negotiate the problematic currents, only four of the convoy managed to enter the harbour with the remainder being carried past. On 14 October, fifty ships-of-the-line from the Franco-Spanish fleet began making ready for sea but a change in the wind direction the next day ensured they could not interfere and Howe was able to get the rest of the convoy into harbour.

Having accomplished the mission, Howe's fleet left the Mediterranean on 19 October and at dawn the next day, encountered a superior enemy force off Cape Spartel. At the subsequent Battle of Cape Spartel, the British formed line-of-battle but the enemy fleet to windward refused to close and instead opened fire from distance. Most of the shot fell short and Howe's fleet did not bother to reply. Under orders to return home, it did so without further incident. The engagement had cost the British 61 dead and 108 wounded but there were no casualties aboard Victory. This was Victory's last action of the war; hostilities ended in September 1783 and she was placed in ordinary.

In 1787, Victory was ordered to be readied for service following a revolt in the Netherlands but before she could put to sea, a Prussian invasion, leading to the signing of the Triple Alliance treaty removed the threat. Victory was seaworthy for the Nootka Crisis in 1790 however, when she was stationed in the Channel. The crisis was resolved peacefully and after taking part in several patrols, Victory returned to Spithead on 1 September 1790. Despite paying off, she remained anchored there into the new year when she was refitted in preparation for the Russian Armament. Pilots with a specific knowledge of the Baltic Sea were taken on board in case the fleet was sent there to thwart Russian ambition but in July, a diplomatic solution was found.

== French Revolutionary Wars ==
When the French Revolutionary War broke out in 1793, Victory joined the Mediterranean Fleet as the flagship of Vice-Admiral Samuel Hood and took part in the occupation of Toulon in August, an action agreed with the Bourbon loyalists who held the town. When the British were forced to withdraw in December, they destroyed as much of the dockyard and as many enemy ships as they could and sailed to the Hyeres Islands from where Hood plotted a blockade of Corsica. Resentment at French rule there had sparked a revolt led by Pasquale Paoli whose guerrillas had driven the invaders into three fortified towns in the north of the island; Calvi, San Fiorenzo and Bastia. Hood despatched a proportion of his fleet to prevent the French from shipping in supplies.

On 24 January 1794, Hood received word that the Corsicans wished for the governance and protection of Britain and set off with his remaining ships. They were caught in a storm however and had to spend several nights sheltering off the island of Elba before heading into Portoferraio on the 29 January for repairs. The fleet eventually arrived on 7 February at San Fiorenzo, where an attack was carried out on the Torra di Mortella at the west end of the bay. Victory did not play much of an active role in the attack and on 11 February was blown off station by a strong wind. After sheltering off Cap Corse, she returned on 17 February in time to see the tower captured and, soon after, the town capitulate. Hood next sailed his ships to Bastia joining with a squadron under Horatio Nelson that had been blockading the town since 7 February. Despite this additional show of force, the garrison would not surrender. Troops were landed and the town was invested, leading to a protracted siege which only ended when reinforcements from Gibraltar forced the French to seek honourable terms.

By June, the French had repaired much of the damage caused by the retreating British, and sailed from Toulon with seven ships-of-the-line. On hearing this, Hood left Corsica with thirteen ships of his own with the hope of bringing them to action. When the French sighted Hood's fleet on 10 June, they took refuge in Golfe Juan near Antibes and anchored in a tight crescent formation. Hood was disinclined to attack, considering the position too well defended, and returned to Corsica. Hood took his ships back to Toulon where he strengthened the blockade of the port. In November, after two years at sea, Hood returned home in Victory. Arriving off Portsmouth on 5 December, Hood struck his flag and the ship was taken in for much needed repairs.

=== Battle of the Hyères Islands ===
By July the following year, Victory had rejoined the Mediterranean Fleet, now commanded by Admiral William Hotham in the 100-gun Britannia. Shortly after her arrival, Victory received Rear-Admiral Robert Mann, who moved his flag from the 74-gun Cumberland, and on the 8 July the fleet set off in pursuit of a French force near the Hyeres Islands. On the night of 12 July the British were caught in a storm and several ships, including Victory were damaged. The French were seen at dawn, as Victory was having new sails fitted but was ready by 08:00 when Hotham ordered a general chase. Victory made good progress and along with the 74s Culloden and Cumberland was catching up on the French rear. A sudden shift in the wind allowed the trailing three French ships to turn and open up on the British van which fired back, forcing the French 74, Alcide, to surrender. Culloden and Cumberland did not stop to take possession of the stricken French ship but Victory had been much damaged in the action: all the running rigging along with much of her standing rigging, the main topgallant mast, the topsail yardarms on the foremast and the spritsail yardarms had all been shot away, and considerable damage had been done to the masts that remained. When two French frigates arrived to tow away the crippled Alcide, Victory saw them off, sinking one of their boats in the process. Hotham ordered a withdrawal of his fleet when the French took refuge in Frejus Bay; by then it was dark and a lee shore wind meant the British would be trapped if they continued their pursuit.

=== Battle of Cape St. Vincent ===
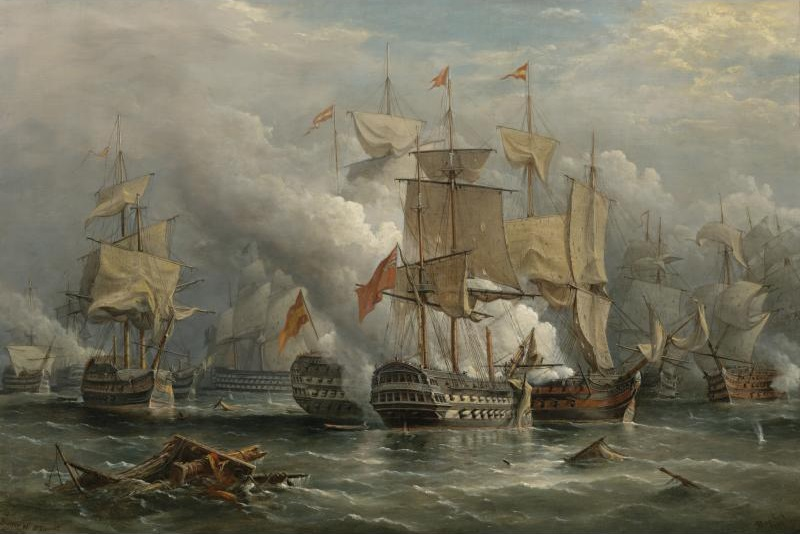
The Battle of Cape Saint Vincent, Richard Brydges Beechey, 1881

In 1796, Captain Robert Calder (First Captain) and Captain George Grey (Second Captain), commanded Victory under Admiral Sir John Jervis's flag. By the end of that year, the balance of power in the Mediterranean had shifted in favour of the French whose success on land had reduced the number of harbours amenable to British ships. Spain had switched allegiance, making her ports unavailable and substantially increasing the number of enemy ships facing the Royal Navy. Sending Nelson in the 38-gun HMS Minerve to supervise Elba's evacuation, on 16 December, Jervis withdrew his fleet to the Tagus on the Portuguese coast. On 18 January, Victory left Lisbon with nine other ships-of-the-line and a convoy bound for Brazil. After taking the convoy safely out to sea, Jervis positioned his ships of Cape St Vincent to await a reinforcement of five ships-of-the-line from the Channel Fleet, which arrived on 6 February under Rear-Admiral William Parker. Nelson, having completed his mission, was on his way to rejoin Jervis when, on the night of 11 February, he sailed undetected through the Spanish fleet in the thick fog. Nelson located Jervis on 13 February who, on hearing the Spanish were at sea, immediately instructed his ships to intercept. The following morning, with his 15 ships sailing in two columns, Jervis addressed his officers on Victory's quarterdeck how, "A victory to England is very essential at the moment" he impressed upon them. Jervis was ignorant of how many ships the Spanish had available, but was informed at 06:30 hours, that five had been spotted in the south-east. By 09:00 hours, the first enemy ships were visible from Victory's masthead, and at 11:00 hours, Jervis gave the order to form line of battle. Calder counted the ships as they appeared out of the fog but when he reached 27, Jervis cut in, "Enough, Sir. No more of that. The die is cast and if there are 50 sail, I will go through them". The Spanish were sailing in two divisions, allowing Jervis to exploit the space between. The ship's log records how Victory halted the Spanish division, raking ships both ahead and astern, while Jervis' private memoirs recall how Victory's broadside so terrified the 112-gun Principe de Asturias that she "squared her yards, ran clear out of the battle and did not return". Noticing that the major part of the Spanish fleet could pass astern and reunite with the others, Jervis signalled a course change. However Sir Charles Thompson, leading the rear division, chose to continue his course, leaving the following ships in confusion as to whether to proceed as their divisional commander or comply with the Admiral's order. Nelson, in the 74-gun HMS Captain, had understood Jervis' intentions and wore out of line to intercept the main fleet with other ships soon following. This manoeuvre was instrumental in bringing about a conclusive outcome to the battle. The Spanish lost four ships in the action and were frustrated in their attempt to join their French and Dutch allies in the channel. The dead and wounded from the four captured vessels ships alone amounted to 261 and 342, respectively; more than the total number of British casualties of 73 dead and 327 wounded. There was one fatality aboard Victory; a cannonball narrowly missed Jervis and decapitated a nearby sailor.

After putting into the Tagus for repairs, Jervis had his fleet apply a close blockade to the port of Cádiz. By this time, Victory was in some disrepair. Grey had noted a few months previous that, "...the ship is very weak abaft; the transoms between the lower and middle decks work exceedingly". Jervis, soon after the battle, echoed Grey's concerns, writing how, "...the step of a man from the poop ladder to the quarterdeck made her whole stern frame shake", and adding that, "...every line-of-battle ship in the fleet will be found sound, except Victory".

In March, the Mediterranean fleet received reinforcements which included the recently built, 110-gun HMS Ville de Paris. She became Jervis' new flagship on 30 March and Victory was offered to Nelson who had been promoted to rear admiral following his actions off Cape St Vincent. Nelson however declined, preferring the 74-gun HMS Theseus. Jervis, elected to keep Victory in his fleet, reasoning that she was superior to his other 100-gun ship HMS Britannia, and appointed Thomas Sotheby as her captain. Discovering that Sotheby had "...neither the nerves nor experience for so great a charge", Jervis replaced him with Captain William Cumming at the end of June.

Victory was sent home in August. Stopping to revictual at Lisbon, she left with four Spanish prizes on 8 September and arrived at Torbay at the end of the month. She made her final destination, the dockyard at Chatham on 7 November.

== Reconstruction ==
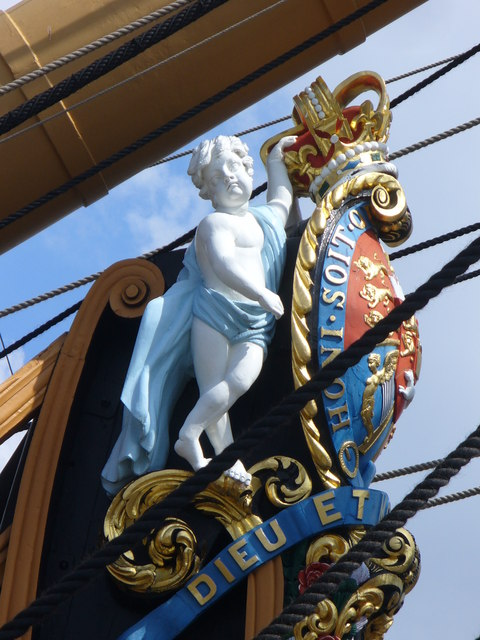
Victory's 'new' figurehead fitted during her 1800-1803 repair.

On arrival at Chatham, Victory underwent an inspection that revealed the extensive weaknesses in the stern timbers and as a result she was removed from active service. In December 1798 she was refitted as a hospital ship for wounded French and Spanish prisoners of war, and moored in the Medway. The Admiralty advocated for her full conversion to a prison hulk but reneged after the Navy Board advised that such a complex refitting would be all but permanent and that Victory could never be reverted to a warship.

The decision to recondition Victory came after the 98-gun HMS Impregnable was wrecked on 8 October 1799. While returning from escort duty to Lisbon, Impregnable ran aground near Portsmouth and after attempts to refloat had failed, was stripped and dismantled, leaving the Royal Navy short of a three-decked ship-of-the-line. When the renovation started in 1800, it was thought the cost would not exceed £23,500 but this rose to £70,933 as the repairs became an extensive reconstruction.

It was during this refit that her gun capacity was increased from 100 to 104 guns with the cutting of additional gun ports. The interior of her powder magazine was sheathed in copper to reduce the risk of sparks and to protect against rodents. The open galleries along her stern were closed in, providing more usable cabin space and giving extra protection in rough weather. Further weatherproofing was provided by the addition of high coamings around the lower hatchways while the chainwales were moved above the gun ports to prevent gun handling interfering with the rigging. A less ornate figurehead was also fitted, the oversized original featured figures representing the four continents; Europe, Asia, Africa and America. The fighting tops, previously oak, were replaced with fir, in order to save weight and were manufactured in two pieces to facilitate easier removal. She was also repainted from red to black and yellow. Initially the gun ports were yellow to match but these were later changed to black, giving a pattern later called the "Nelson chequer", which was adopted by most Royal Navy ships in the decade following the Battle of Trafalgar and is seen on the ship today. A peace was negotiated in March 1802 but work continued unabated and within a year, relations with France had deteriorated to such a degree that the Admiralty ordered Victory to be made ready for sea with all haste. The work was completed in April 1803, and the ship left for Portsmouth the following month under her new captain, Samuel Sutton. She arrived at Spithead on 14 May, four days before war was declared.

== Napoleonic Wars ==
=== Nelson and Trafalgar ===
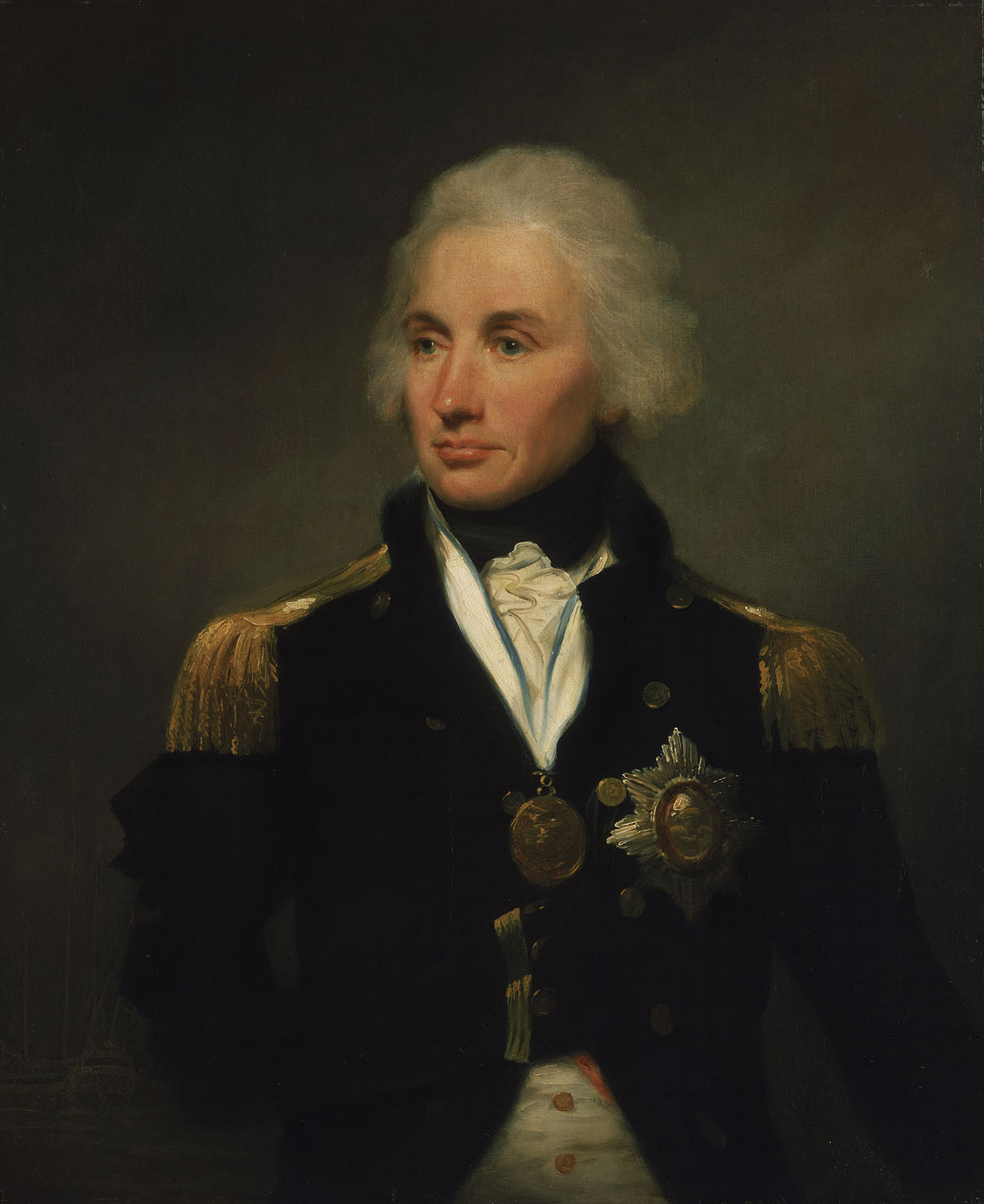
Vice-Admiral Horatio Nelson flew his flag twice on Victory

Vice-Admiral Nelson hoisted his flag in Victory on 18 May 1803, with Samuel Sutton as his flag captain. However, the ship was not ready to sail until the afternoon of 20 May, when Nelson re-embarked and Victory put to sea in the company of the 32-gun frigate HMS Amphion. Nelson's orders were to meet with Cornwallis off Brest, but after 24 hours of searching failed to find him. Nelson, anxious to reach the Mediterranean without delay, decided to transfer to Amphion off Ushant.

On 28 May, Victory captured the 32-gun French frigate Ambuscade, bound for Rochefort. Reuniting with Nelson off Toulon, on 31 July, Sutton swapped ships with the captain of Amphion, Thomas Masterman Hardy and Nelson raised his flag in Victory once more.

While off the island of Toro, near Majorca, on 4 April 1805, word was received from the 36-gun HMS Phoebe that the French fleet under Pierre-Charles Villeneuve had left Toulon. Nelson, thinking it likely that the French were sailing for Egypt, set a course for Sicily but Villeneuve was in fact intending to merge with the Spanish fleet at Cádiz. On 9 May, the 32-gun HMS Orpheus brought the news that the combined Franco-Spanish fleet of 17 ships had entered the Atlantic a month ago. The British fleet of ten ships-of-the-line and three frigates revictualled at Lagos Bay, Portugal before sailing west on 11 May in pursuit. On arrival in the West Indies it was discovered that the Villeneuve had returned to Europe, where he was expected by French invasion forces at Boulogne-sur-Mer.

The Franco-Spanish fleet had encountered Admiral Sir Robert Calder's squadron on 22 July and fought an indecisive action in the fog at the Battle of Cape Finisterre before seeking safety in Vigo and Ferrol. Admiral Cornwallis's Channel Fleet was joined off Ushant by Calder on 14 August and Nelson the day after. The latter sailed home in Victory, leaving his remaining ships with Cornwallis whose force now numbered thirty-three ships-of-the-line. Twenty of these were sent under Calder to hunt for the combined fleet, last seen at Ferrol. On 21 August news came that the enemy had arrived back at Cádiz where Lord Nelson joined Lord Collingwood on the 28 September.

==== Battle of Trafalgar ====
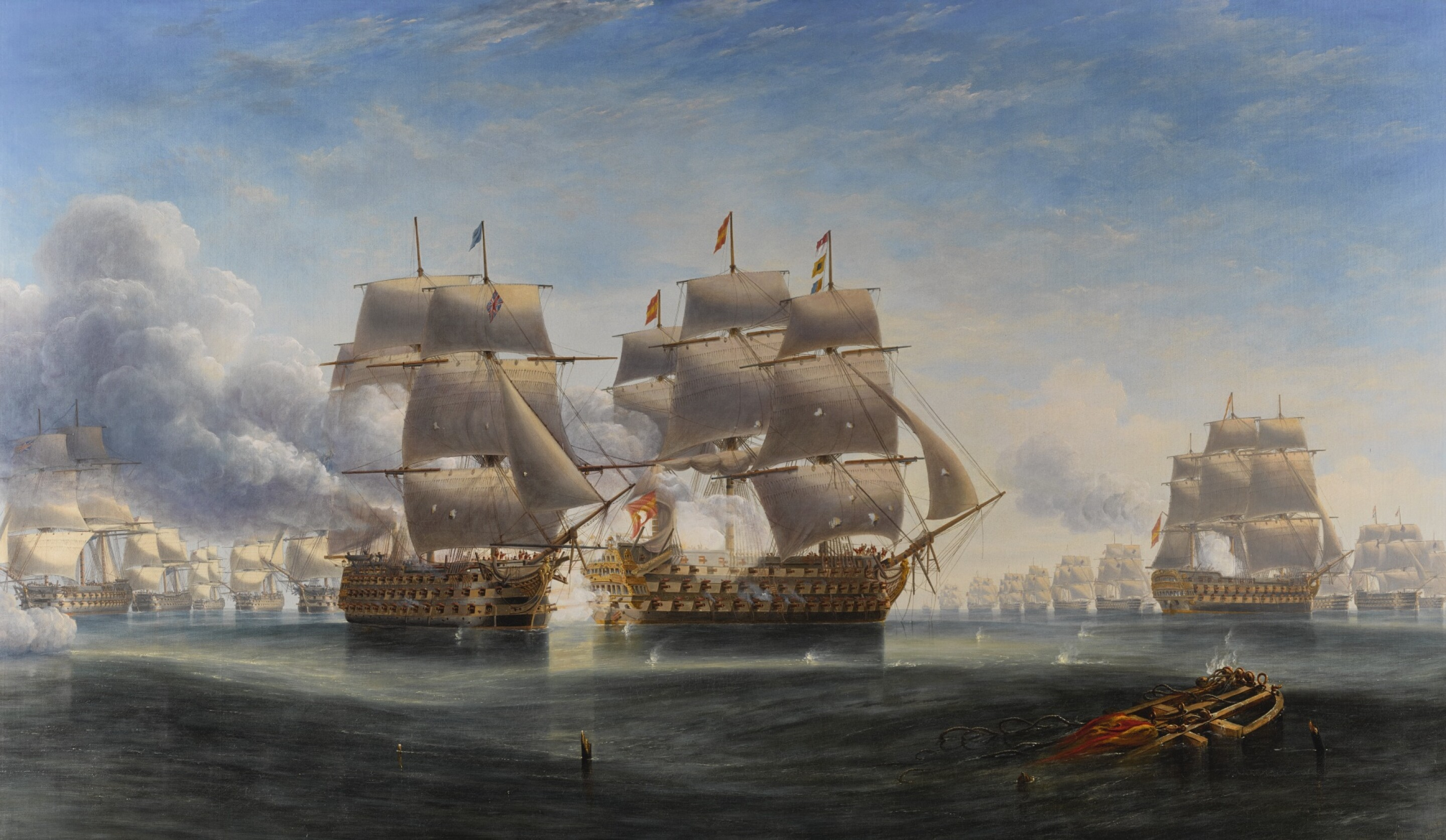
The opening engagement at the Battle of Trafalgar, by J.W. Carmichael (oil on canvas, 1856)

Villeneuve, on learning he was to be replaced in command, was galvanised into action, setting sail for the Mediterranean on 19 October. At about 19:00 hours British frigates were spotted and the order was given to form line of battle. The British fleet, aware of Villeneuve's presence was in the meantime on a parallel course some 10 miles away over the horizon and on the morning of 21 October, turned to intercept. Nelson had already decided to break the enemy line in two places and destroy the middle and rear sections before the van could turn about and come to their aid. At 06:00 hours, Nelson ordered his fleet into two columns.

Because of light winds it was six hours before the 100-gun Royal Sovereign, leading the British lee column, was able to open fire on Fougueux of 74 guns. Around 30 minutes later, Victory broke the line between the 80-gun French flagship Bucentaure and 74-gun Redoutable, and fired her guns at such close range that the flames from the ignited powder singed the windows of the French flagship before the shockwave and cannonballs arrived. Victory's port guns unleashed a devastating broadside, raking Bucentaure and blowing a huge hole in her side. The maelstrom of cannonballs and grapeshot dismounted the French ship's guns and killed and wounded between 300 and 450 of her 750 to 800 complement almost immediately, putting her out of action. At 13:15, a musket ball entered Nelson's left shoulder and lodged in his spine. The shot was fatal and he died at 16:30. So much death had occurred on Victory's quarterdeck that Redoutable's crew attempted to board. The action was checked by the timely intervention of Eliab Harvey in the 98-gun HMS Temeraire, unleashing a destructive broadside into the French ship. Nelson's last order was for the fleet to anchor, but this was countermanded by Vice-Admiral Cuthbert Collingwood.

Victory had been badly damaged in the battle and suffered 57 killed and 102 wounded. Unable to move under her own power, HMS Neptune towed her to Gibraltar for repairs. On 4 November, with Nelson's body on board, Victory left for England under a jury rig but was in such poor condition and leaking so badly, she had to be taken in tow once more. Arriving at Portsmouth on 4 December, the ship underwent emergency repairs before continuing to Sheerness on 11 December. She did not reach her destination until 22 December however, having been delayed by strong winds. Nelson was taken upriver to Greenwich in the port commissioner's yacht where he lay in state before his burial in St. Paul's Cathedral on 9 January 1806.

On 15 January, Victory paid off, with the majority of her crew being reassigned to the recently commissioned HMS Ocean of 98 guns. Victory's rigging, guns and stores were taken off while a preliminary inspection revealed the need for a dry dock. The necessity for a spring tide and other delays prevented this until 6 March when she was moved into number two dock at Chatham, where she had been built 47 years earlier. After repairs to the hull, Victory was recoppered and rerigged with new masts and spars before being refloated on 3 May. She was after moored in the Medway where she was aired out and periodically inspected until 23 April 1807, when she was again dry docked for further repairs.

=== Baltic service ===
The Admiralty Board considered Victory too old, and in too great a disrepair, to be restored as a first-rate. To decrease the strain on her hull and in response to an Admiralty order issued in November 1807, the 68-pound carronades were replaced with 32-pounders, two of the 32-pounder cannon were removed altogether and all the 24-pound cannon replaced with 18-pounders, relegating her to second-rate in the process and cutting the number of crew required to operate her. Her refit at Chatham also required her masts to be stepped on the lower deck rather than the keel; an initiative introduced in January to save timber.

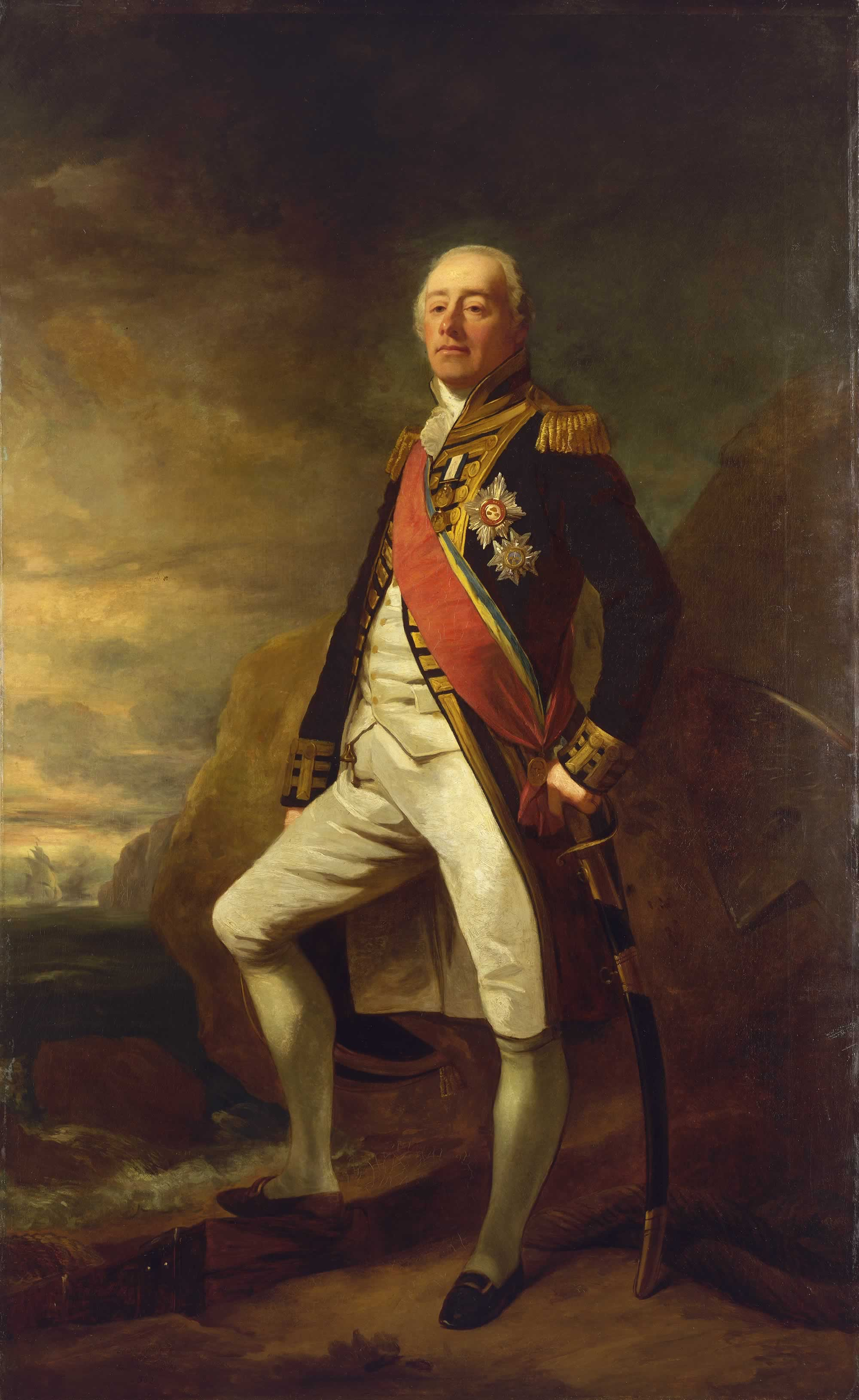
Painting by Edwin Williams of Vice-Admiral James Saumarez, who flew his flag aboard Victory during operations in the Baltic.

In 1808, Victory was brought back into service as the flagship of Vice-Admiral Sir James Saumarez, who had been ordered to take command of Royal Navy forces in the Baltic. Samuel Hood, assisted by Rear-Admiral Sir Richard Keats, was already in the area operating a fleet of nine 74-gun and two 64-gun ships-of-the-line, five frigates, together with various bomb vessels, sloops and gunbrigs. Since the Treaties of Tilsit, the Baltic fleet had mainly been concerned with convoy protection, the Russian invasion of Swedish Finland and the threat of a second invasion of Sweden's territory from an army across the Oresund in Denmark. To deter such a move, a proposal to station 10,000 British troops in Skane was being brokered by Sir John Moore. Negotiations with the King of Sweden, Gustav IV Adolf, went badly, the plan was rejected and Moore put under house arrest.

On 18 March, Saumarez raised his flag on Victory, sailing for the Nore on 1 April. There, on 16 April, he received his final orders before leaving for the Baltic on 30 April in the company of two gun brigs. Victory eventually arrived at Gothenburg on 9 May having been further delayed by the weather. During the evening of 29 June, while Victory was anchored off the city, Saumarez hosted a ball for a few of its citizens. During the event, Moore arrived aboard, having escaped from captivity four days previous. The following morning, Victory withdrew to Vinga where Saumarez' main force was kept, and Moore transferred to the 74-gun HMS Audacious which was due to escort a convoy to Yarmouth. After arriving in England, Moore was sent to Portugal in July, where he took command of the British forces there. After Moore's escape, Saumarez was freed of the need to remain in the Lieutenant-General's vicinity. Hitherto having only been able to send small squadrons under Hood or Keats, he was now able to move the bulk of his fleet into the Baltic Sea where he could aid the Swedes fighting in Finland and bring the Russian fleet to action if the chance occurred. Victory's progress was slow, the winds were unfavourable and extra care had to be taken manoeuvring such a large ship in shallow waters. She eventually made the Danish island of Mon on 25 July where she rendezvoused with Hood's ships. Saumarez had a large subsidy on board that the British government had promised to the Swedish king, and on 31 July, sailed on to Stockholm.

When Napoleon deposed the King of Spain in August and placed his brother on the throne there was widespread revolt. In Holstein, 12,000 Spanish troops under Marques de la Romana, refused to swear an oath of allegiance and appealed to the British for passage home. Victory was at Karlskrona on 4 August, while Saumarez paid a visit to heads of the dockyard and dined with the officers there. Seven days later he received a communication from King Gustav requesting British ships be sent to participate in a combined operation off the Hanko Peninsula, where the Swedish port was being held by the Russians. While waiting to be resupplied, another letter arrived, from which Saumarez learned that Romana's soldiers were awaiting evacuation and sailed instead to the Little Belt strait. A squadron under Keats had already begun the operation when Victory arrived off Funen on 18 August. After welcoming Romana on board, Victory's boats were launched to assist with the ferrying of his troops. Keats had requisitioned 60 Danish sloops which, in addition to his own ships, provided sufficient space for the 12,000 Spanish soldiers, the last of whom boarded on 21 August.

Victory with HMS Mars, Goliath both of 74 guns and Africa of 64 guns, then set sail for Hanko. Saumarez received news en route, via a Swedish frigate encountered on 30 August, that the Russian fleet under Admiral Pyotr Khanykov was at Ragervik; an Anglo-Swedish force under Hood and Henrik Johan Nauckhoff had chased them there, the two 74s HMS Centaur and Implacable destroying the Russian 74-gun ship, Vsevolod, in the process. Saumarez' squadron arrived off the coast of Estonia at 14:00 where the ships of Hood and Nauckhoff had the Russians trapped in port. On 1 September, after boarding one of his smaller ships, an 18-gun sloop-of-war, for a close-up inspection of the enemy's position, Saumarez decided to test their defences by giving them a broadside from Victory as she passed as near to the western shore as was prudent. The fire was returned by the batteries protecting the harbour. Bomb vessels were then employed in an attempt to either destroy the Russian ships or compel them to come out and fight but this failed in both respects and a plan to use fireships was rejected when it was discovered that a strong, well protected boom had been placed across the entrance. The Anglo-Swedish force therefore had to be content with maintaining its blockade, which it did until the end of September, when the threat of being trapped by ice forced Saumarez to retreat to Karlskrona. When the Mars was sent to check on Khanykov's fleet on 4 November, the harbour was found empty. Saumarez then sailed his ships to Gothenburg, arriving on 28 October, where he received orders to return home. On 3 November, Victory, Implacable and Centaur escorted a large convoy to England, anchoring in The Downs on 8 November.

When Moore's troops were obliged to withdraw to Corunna towards the end of the year, Victory with Ville de Paris and three 74-gun ships, escorted transports to the north-west of Spain for an evacuation. Uncertainty over the army's location meant that the rescue party was initially dispatched to Vigo where, on learning of the mistake, the transports had to be towed out of the harbour because of light winds. British troops were still engaging the enemy on the heights above the town when Victory reached Corunna on the night of 14 January 1809, dropping anchor outside the port at 11:30 the following day. On the afternoon of 16 January, the remnants of Moore's army entered the town and boat crews began taking them from the beach to the awaiting transports in the harbour. The construction of a French gun battery forced the British to move their ships further out but the last troops were embarked on the morning of 18 January and the convoy set sail for England. It arrived in Cawsand Bay near Plymouth on 23 January and Victory was back in the Baltic by 8 May, when she dropped anchor off Gothenburg.

During Victory's absence, a coup d'etat had taken place in Sweden. Begun in March, the coup of 1809 culminated on 1 May with the deposition of King Gustav and his uncle, Charles XIII being appointed King. Britain did not officially recognise the new regime but the alliance was maintained and the passage of trade through the Baltic continued under the protection of the Royal Navy; ships from England would gather at Vinga sound, where Victory was mainly stationed, to be escorted through either the Oresund or Great Belt, while ships from the other direction would assemble at Karlskrona. Following the death of the Swedish heir presumptive in January 1810, Napoleon's cousin by marriage, Jean-Baptiste Bernadotte was selected as the new heir and regent, automatically allying Sweden to France. Bernadotte however, was determined to act in the interests of Sweden and maintain the flow of trade, and Saumarez allowed him to cross the Oresund to his new realm later that year unimpeded. Despite this cordial start, Sweden, under pressure from Napoleon, declared war on Britain on 17 November.

When reinforcements were required by Wellington's army in the Iberian Peninsula, Victory was withdrawn from the Baltic, converted to a troopship and used to convey soldiers to Lisbon. She sailed for Portugal on 30 January 1811, with 717 personnel from the 36th Regiment of Foot on board but was unable to make headway until 15 February when the wind changed to a more favourable direction. It remained fickle however, causing further delays and it was not until 2 March that the ship entered the Tagus. On her return to Vinga on 2 May, Victory was visited, under a flag of truce, by Gothenburg's military commander. He assured Saumarez that the declaration of war had been a formality, there would be no hostile action and that the Swedish Government wished to remain on the best of terms with Britain. Nevertheless, Saumarez' ships were henceforth additionally employed in a blockade of the Swedish navy at Karlskrona. In September, Saumarez received news of two Danish gunboats to the south, between Vinga and Anholt, waiting to ambush merchant ships bound for England. He immediately sent two of Victory's boats in a cutting out expedition. Despite having less than a fifth of the numbers, the British crew managed to board and capture both Danish vessels. Towards the end of the year, Saumarez decided to sail his ships to England for much needed repairs rather than remain for the harsh winter when trade routes were closed due to ice. Bad weather at first prevented the withdrawal until 17 December and then hampered its progress. Several ships were lost on the journey including the 98-gun HMS St George and 74-gun HMS Defence. Victory, under a single reefed sail, crossed the North Sea by running before the wind until she was off the coast of Suffolk on 24 December. She limped into The Solent two days later. When she returned to Gothenburg on 3 May 1812, relations between France and Russia had soured and an official peace treaty with Sweden was impending. By the time Napoleon had begun his march on Moscow, there was no need for a large Royal Navy presence in the Baltic. Victory returned home at the end of the year, arriving off Spithead on 7 November.

== Final years afloat ==
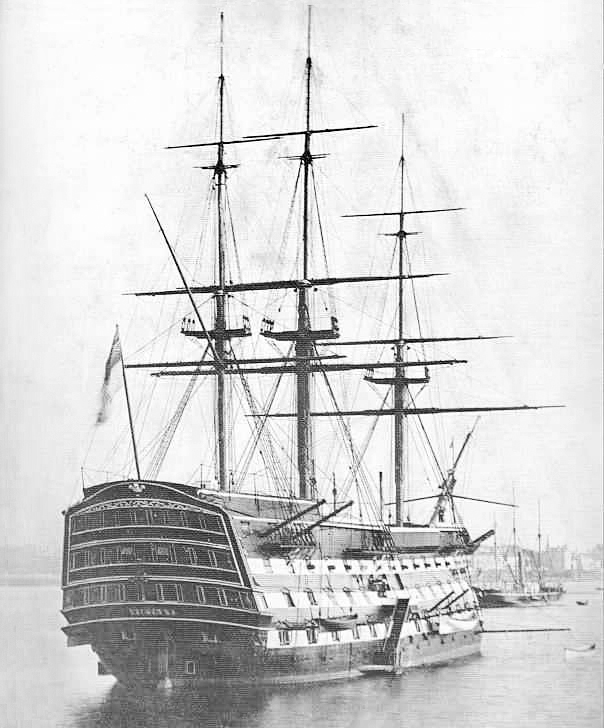
HMS Victory moored in Portsmouth Harbour in 1884

Victory was later relocated to the mouth of Portsmouth Harbour off Gosport, for service as a floating depot and, from 1813 to 1817, as a prison ship, although she was never hulked. In March 1814, the ship was brought into dry dock for a major reconstruction and thus was not available for the hundred days conflict after Napoleon escaped from exile in Elba. The repairs included the fitting of metal braces to strengthen the frame. This was the earliest recorded use of iron for this purpose; nuts, bolts and nails had for some time been used to hold a ship's structure together but not to reinforce it. Since 1803, when her stern galleries were closed in, her outward appearance had remained unchanged but during this refit her beakhead and bulkhead were removed and the bow rounded off in line with Robert Seppings recommendations of 1811. The diagonal bracing that Seppings would introduce as standard in 1817 was not carried out however. She was repainted in black and white, the new norm for Royal Navy ships, and with only interior work left to do, the ship was taken out of dock in December 1815 and anchored in the harbour, where she was completed in January 1816. An Admiralty decision to have all three-deckers as first-rate ships, meant that when Victory was recalled to active service in February 1817, she was relisted as such and re-armed with 104 guns. However, her hull remained in poor condition and in January 1822, she was placed in dry dock at Portsmouth so further repairs could be carried out. When she was refloated in January 1824, she was considered suitable only for use as the Port admiral's flagship. She remained in that role at Portsmouth Harbour until April 1830.

In 1831 the Admiralty issued orders for the ageing ship to be broken up and her timbers reused in other vessels, but a public outcry prevented her destruction. She instead became home to the Captain of Ordinary, whose responsibility was to look after all the ships that had been laid up, but in 1832 she was recommissioned as flagship to the port admiral once more. From that point, the Admiralty began inviting civilian visitors to aboard for tours. On 18 July 1833, the heir presumptive, Princess Victoria, and her mother, the Duchess of Kent, met veterans of the Trafalgar campaign on the quarterdeck. This event generated a surge of interest in the vessel, and an annual growth in civilian visitors to between 10,000 and 12,000. The port admiral moved his flag to the 120-gun HMS Britannia in August 1836 and Victory was without a role until August 1837, when she became flagship to the Admiral Superintendent of the Dockyard.

After Victoria returned for a second time on 21 October 1844, the number of visitors swelled again to more than 22,000 a year. In 1847 Victory was the flagship to the Commander-in-Chief, Portsmouth. In late April 1854, Victory sprang a leak and sank. All on board were rescued and the ship was subsequently raised. By 1857, the escalation in human traffic had caused her to become increasingly decrepit and she was docked again for further repairs and recoppering. She resumed her role on her return to service in 1858, but in 1869 the Commander-in-Chief's flag was transferred to the steam line of battle ship Duke of Wellington and Victory was designated her tender.

Sir Edward Seymour visited the vessel in 1886 as flag captain to the Commander-in-Chief and recalled in his 1911 memoirs, "a more rotten ship than she had become probably never flew the pennant. I could literally run my walking stick through her sides in many places". In 1887, the ship began leaking again and only with some difficulty was she prevented from sinking at her mooring. This prompted the Admiralty to thereafter provide a small annual subsidy for maintenance. That same year, the lower masts of the ship had become so rotten it was decided to replace them with the hollow, iron masts from HMS Shah. They were fitted to the keel as her masts would have been prior to the 1807 refit. In 1889 Victory became the home of a signal school in addition to being a tender. The school remained in Victory until 1904, when training was transferred temporarily to HMS Hercules.

Despite her reuse as a school, Victory continued to deteriorate. In 1903 she was accidentally rammed by the ironclad HMS Neptune, a successor to the vessel that had towed her to Gibraltar. Neptune had broken free of tugs that were towing her and struck Victory on the port side causing considerable damage. Emergency repairs prevented her from sinking, but the Admiralty again proposed that she be scrapped, and it was only the personal intervention of Edward VII that prevented this from occurring. She was instead hastily patched up for the centenary celebration of the Battle of Trafalgar, which had caused a resurgence of interest in the ship. For part of the 1905 festivities she was illuminated with electricity generated by an adjacent submarine. Events were deliberately low key as the British Government did not wish to upset the French who were by then allies; the Entente Cordiale having been signed in 1904. The Society for Nautical Research was formed in 1910 to campaign for the ship's preservation but was unable to secure the backing of the Admiralty, which was at that time being stripped of its assets by an escalating arms race. In 1911, Frank H. Mason's The Book of British Ships remarked how the dilapidated condition of the Victory was "nothing short of an insult". Any plans for the ship were put on hold when the First World War broke out in August 1914, and she was left to deteriorate.

== In dry dock and restoration ==
=== 1921–1939 ===
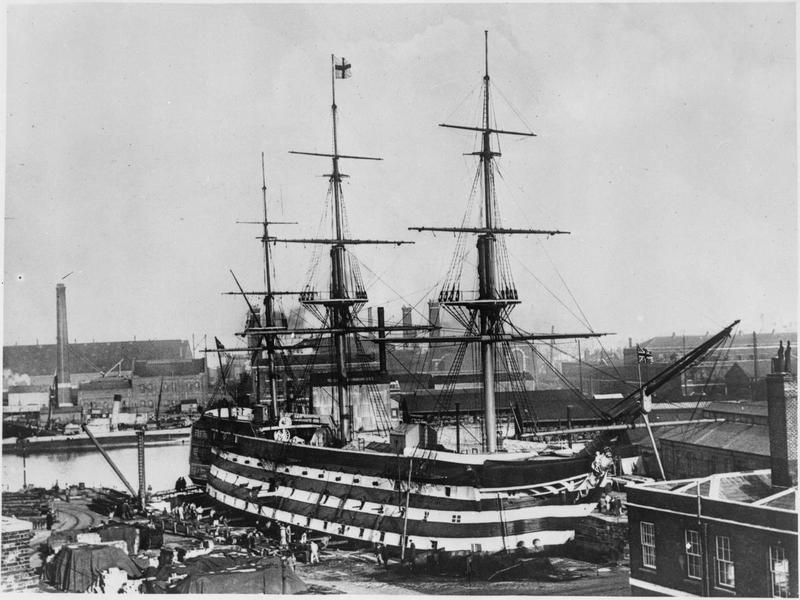
Victory in dry dock with her rounded 'Sepping's' bow

The ship had degraded to such an extent by 1921 that a public campaign gathered momentum with the shipping magnate, Sir James Caird, donating generously to the Save the Victory fund. On 16 December, her ballast was removed and she entered the No. 1 basin at Portsmouth Dockyard where it was discovered that she had hogged so badly that the bow and stern had dropped by 457 millimetres (18 in) and 203 millimetres (8 in) respectively, and that the scarph joints of the keelson had opened up by more than 25.5 millimetres (1 in). Concerns about her ability to remain afloat led to Victory being dry docked indefinitely. Prolonged periods out of water puts tremendous strain on a ship and it was apparent that she would require a specially manufactured, steel frame to support her. Victory was moved to No. 2 dock on 20 March 1922 where a survey revealed that 25 to 50 per cent of her internal fittings needed replacing and most of her furnishings, along with her entire steering system, had been removed or destroyed.

Her relocation started a public debate as to where the ship might lie in the future. Contemporary newspapers included suggestions such as: placing her on a floating plinth, either in Portsmouth or adjacent to the Royal Naval College, Greenwich, a berth on the Thames next to Cleopatra's Needle, or a land-based structure in Trafalgar Square. None of these options were seriously considered however; the ship was too damaged to be moved safely and the Admiralty elected to leave her in situ. No. 2 dock became Victory's permanent home and is now the oldest dry dock in the world still in use.

On 21 October 1922 the Admiral of the Fleet Sir Doveton Sturdee issued a further public plea for "many thousands of pounds" of public donations in The Times. He wrote: "The value of the Victory is no transitory thing. She must be preserved in order that our children's children may draw from her the same inspiration that we have drawn ourselves, and our fathers before us."

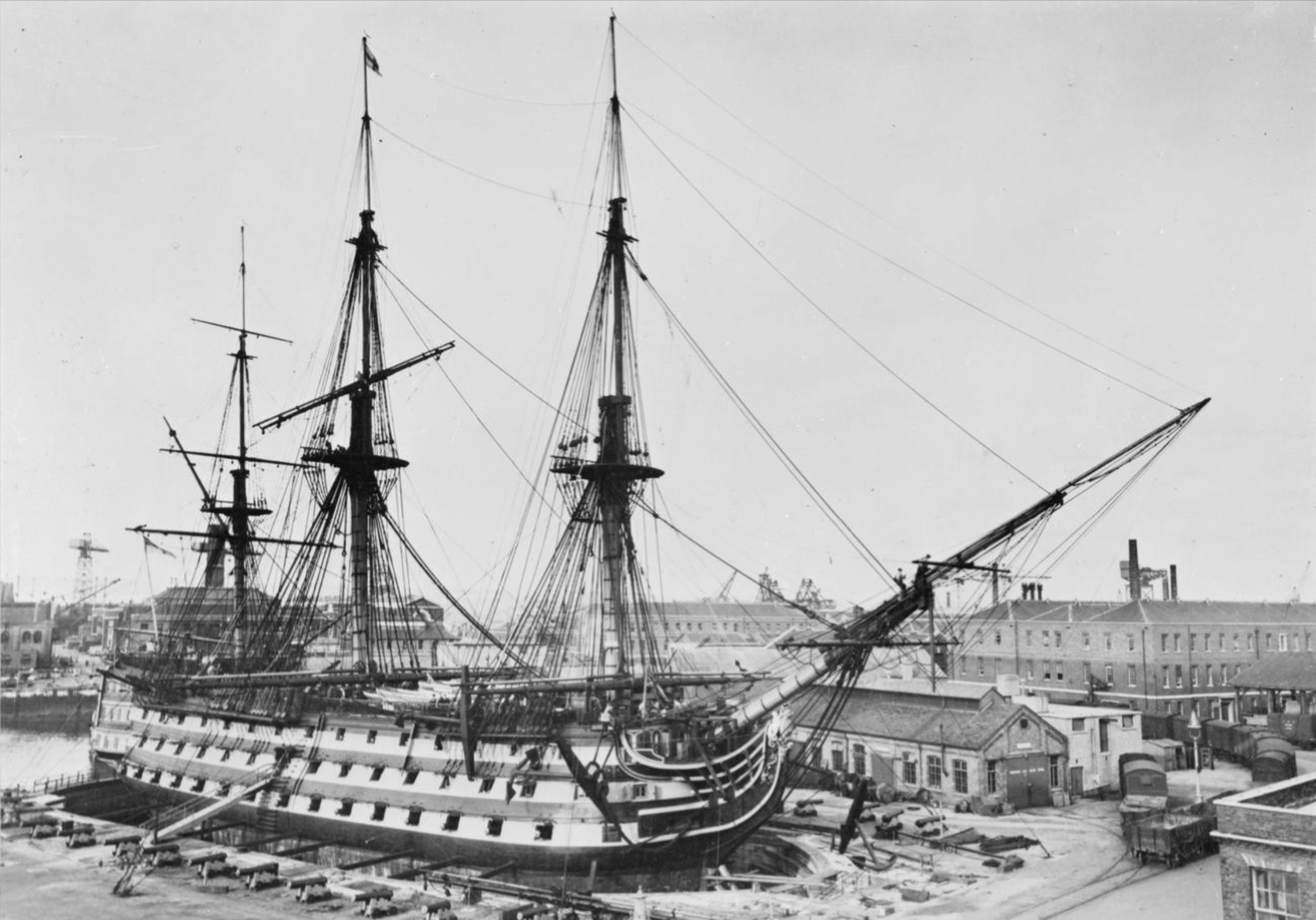
...and with her restored bulkhead and beakhead

On 8 April 1925, Victory was temporarily refloated within Portsmouth's No. 2 dock, to adjust the supporting cradle and so that Victory's waterline would be at the same level with the top of the dry dock. Sitting higher increased her exposure to the elements and greater force from the wind on her masts and rigging, a non-issue when the boat was afloat as water pressure and hull movement would accommodate this. Nevertheless, the adjustment went ahead, driven by some degree by King George V who had visited Victory in July three years previous. To negate the strain placed on the ship, 127 millimetres (5.0 in) diameter steel rods were passed through the keel and fixed to the concrete dock below and additional stays were fitted from the top of each mast to the dockside. This last refloating of Victory was recorded by Pathé news cameras.

The initial restoration, carried out between 1922 and 1929, was concerned with both the repair of rotten timbers and the return of the ship to her Trafalgar appearance. The most obvious difference was the rounded bow, fitted in 1814, which was demolished and replaced with a square beakhead and bulkhead. An original skylight on the quarterdeck, taken away on the orders of Nelson, then put back in 1830, was once more removed and boarded over. Fittings that had been modernised such as the pumps and steering system received age appropriate replacements, and a fire hearth and Brodie stove installed. A number of the warrant officers' cabins had been disassembled during the ship's harbour service and these were reinstated along with their attendant store rooms, the hanging magazine, the pharmacy, sail rooms, cable tiers and bread store. The captain's and lieutenants' stores had also been removed and these too were re-built, as was the wardroom and senior lieutenants' cabins on the middle deck. Other rooms were renovated and painted, including the Great Cabin, the admiral's day and night cabins on the upper deck, and the captain's day and night cabins on the quarterdeck. Repairs were mainly concerned with hull and in particular the area around the waterline. This timber had at times been submerged and at others allowed to dry, leading to cracks and rotting. Several pillars were replaced on the orlop and lower deck in either oak or teak and some of the frames between the lower and middle deck needed attention. These were all repaired using oak. When it came to repairing the frames on the deck above however, a shortage of oak meant some were restored using fir. The knees supporting the deck beams were checked and many had to be renewed but of the beams themselves, only one required replacement. A plaque commemorating the end of the restoration was unveiled by King George V in 1928 but repairs continued to be made, overseen by the Society for Nautical Research.

=== Post-war restoration (1945–2005) ===
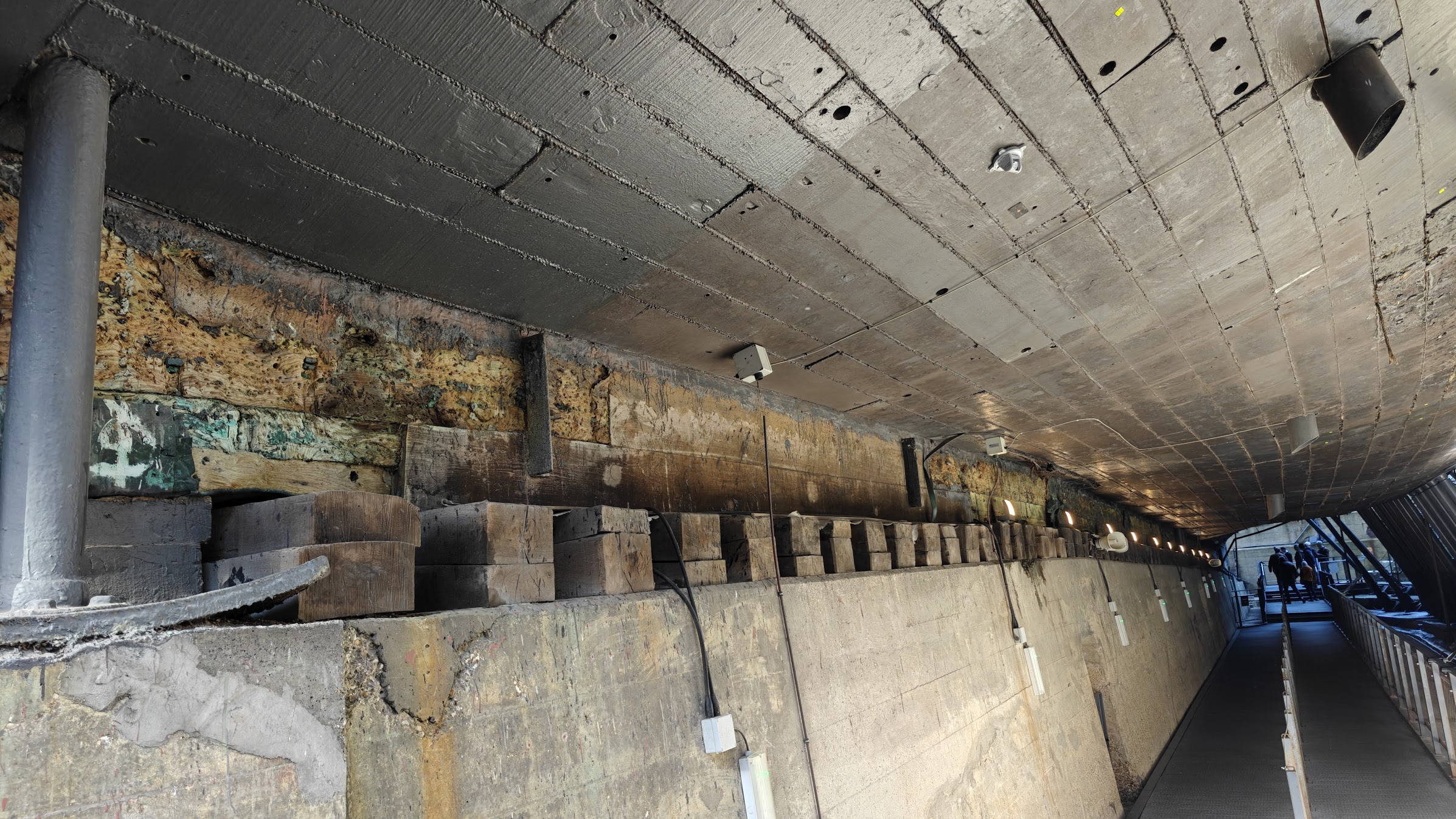
The 1950s restored section of the keel of HMS Victory after damage caused by a German bomb during the Second World War. Notice the relative lack of decay when compared to the original keel.

Work was postponed during the Second World War, and in 1941, more damage was incurred when a 500-pound (230 kg) bomb dropped by the Luftwaffe broke her keel, severely damaged one of the steel cradles and part of the foremast. When German radio falsely reported that the ship had been destroyed, the Admiralty was forced to issue a denial. The problems caused by the explosion were not fully rectified until 1964. Although Victory's main cause of disrepair was rot, there was a significant infestation of deathwatch beetle and the ship was fumigated in 1954, 1955 and 1956. Some of the bulkheads were also removed during this time to increase airflow. Over the next ten years much of the decayed oak was replaced with oily hardwoods such as teak and iroko, which were thought to be more resistant to fungus and pests.

From 1964 further repairs were made to hull, mainly below the lower gundeck. This required the stripping of the copper sheathing outside and the removal of the carpenter's walk, the bulkhead of the carpenter's store and his cabin inside. Work to permanently repair the bomb damage also began in this year. By 1970 the starboard side of the hull had been completed, and work to the port side was finished by the end of the year. In 1973, repair work was halted to allow for refurbishment of the stern and in particular the cockpit, after concerns had been raised about the authenticity of work carried out in 1926. Work on the stern necessitated the removal of all the glazing and the ornately carved mouldings that adorned the gallery rails.

From 1978 to 1983, an annual smoke treatment was applied to the ship in an attempt to eradicate the wood-boring beetles but the population continued to rise. Having deduced that the insects were breeding in rotten timber, deep within the ship where the smoke could not penetrate, it was decided to concentrate on locating and removing those affected areas. A process which was made easier in 1995 with the introduction of the Sibert drill. With a diameter of only 2 mm (0.079 in) it caused minimal damage, and with a length of 350 mm (14 in) it could penetrate deep into the timber to record its density.

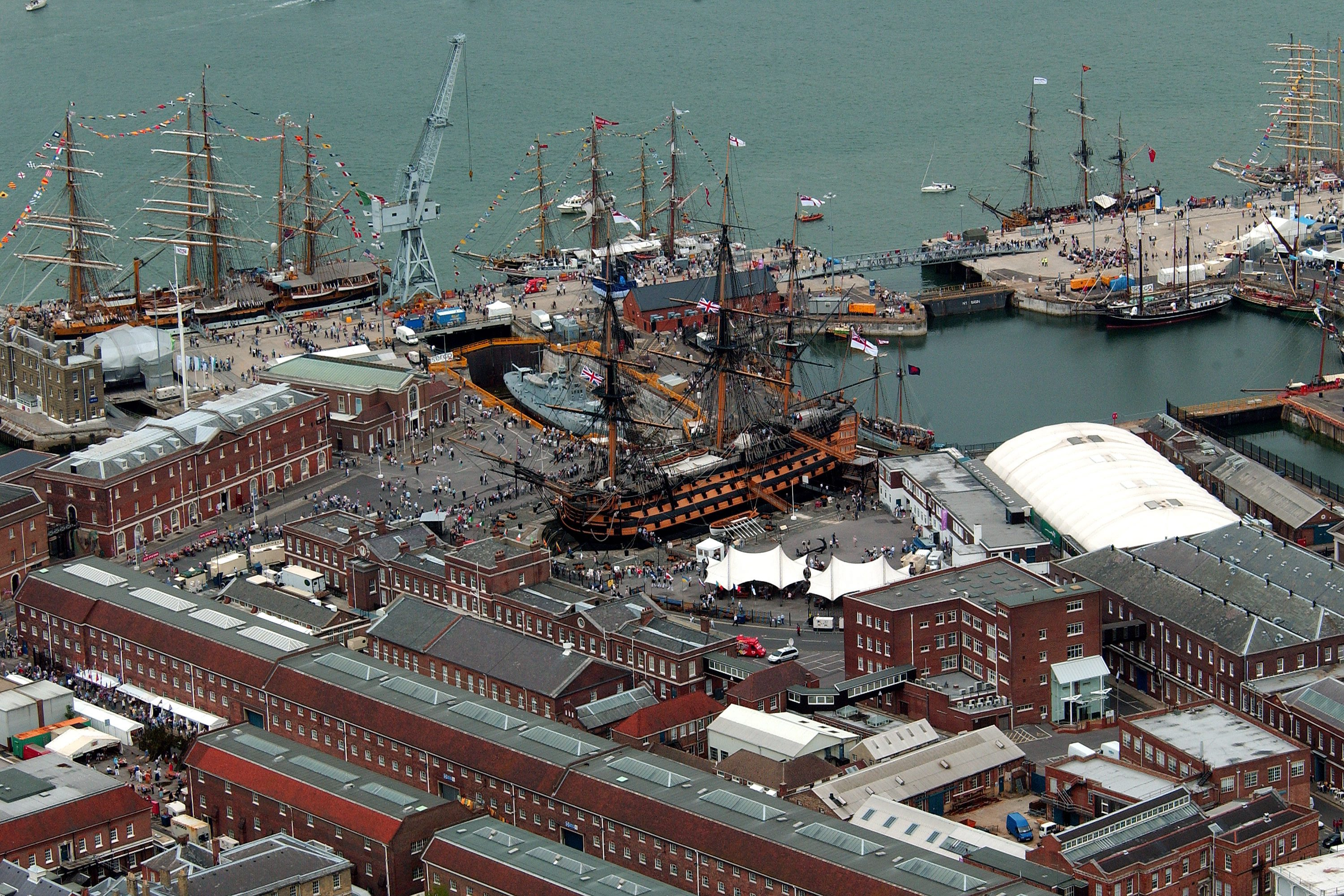
An aerial shot of Portsmouth Historic Dockyard with HMS Victory in the centre during Trafalgar 200 celebrations.

A survey carried out in 1980 found that the beakhead, reinstated in the 1920s, had started to rot. The starboard gangway, a beam supporting the quarterdeck and the steel cradle beneath the ship, also required attention. In order to fix the gangway, a temporary entrance had to be cut in the side towards the rear of the ship. Repairs were put on hold in 1982 because the dockyard was a Royal Navy Fleet Maintenance Base and the country was at war. Restoration to the bow therefore, was not fully completed until 1990 when a newly carved figurehead was also fitted. Just a year later however, the beakhead planking was found to have rotted. Laid in 1989 in Douglas fir the area had become infected with penicillium spinulosum and was relaid in teak. While renewing a beam on the middle gundeck in 1993, a carpenter's note was found which dated the last re-planking of the upperdeck to October 1886.

During the 1990s, civilians began to replace Royal Navy personnel as guides aboard Victory. It was thought that those with a specific interest in the ship would bring greater expertise and enthusiasm to the role. Most were senior officers who had retired from the service. A curator was also appointed in 1991.

Although the decision to return Victory to her Trafalgar appearance had been made in 1920, the demand for constant repairs and maintenance caused many delays. The restoration was eventually finished in 2005 in time for Trafalgar 200; a four-month long celebration which began in July with an international fleet review of more than 150 vessels from around the globe. The festivities included exhibitions and celebration dinners at Portsmouth Historic Dockyard, Victory's birthplace at Chatham Historic Dockyard, and the National Maritime Museum in Greenwich, and culminated on 23 October with a church service at St Paul's Cathedral, attended by the Britain's royal family.

Victory's shot damaged sails were replaced after Trafalgar but her foretopsail survived. First displayed at the Royal Naval Exhibition of 1891, it was lost but later discovered in the Royal Navy barracks at Portsmouth. Extensively damaged by more than 90 cannonballs, it is now kept and cared for at the Royal Naval Museum. Although it is not normally on display, it is brought out for special events such as the 1998 Festival of the Sea and Trafalgar 200.

=== 'The Big Repair' (2005–present) ===
In August 2011, a team of riggers and cranes dismantled the upper masts and rigging of HMS Victory in order to reduce stress on the ship's hull. This was the first time the top masts had been struck since the Second World War. In December, Defence Equipment and Support awarded an initial five-year project management contract to BAE Systems, with an option to extend to ten years. The restoration is worth £16 million over the life of the contract and will include work to the masts and rigging, replacement side planking, and the addition of fire control measures. It is expected to be the most extensive refit since the ship returned from Trafalgar.

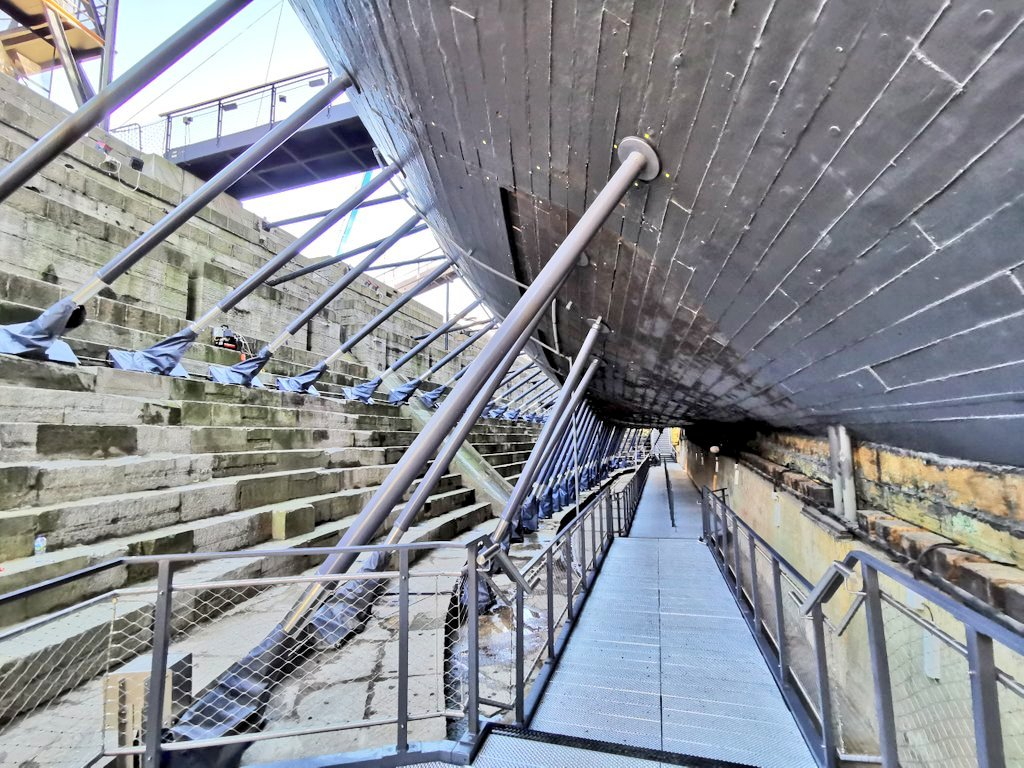
HMS Victory dock walkway, opened in August 2020

As Victory is a Royal Navy ship, the Board of the Admiralty has always accepted responsibility for maintaining her as such but the cost of restoring her to Trafalgar condition has been met by donations. Although the Ministry of Defence retains overall control, since 5 March 2012, responsibility for management of the ship has passed to a dedicated HMS Victory Preservation Trust, established as part of the National Museum of the Royal Navy which includes the Submarine Museum at Gosport, the Royal Marines Museum on Portsea Island and the Fleet Air Arm Museum in Yeovil. This action has allowed for external fundraising and a donation of £25 million was immediately secured from Sir Donald Gosling which was then matched by the Government.

Victory underwent a major restoration in 2017, it was discovered that the hull had been moving at a rate of half a centimetre each year, for a total of around 20 cm since the 1970s. To combat this, a new support system was installed over a period of three years from 2018 to 2021. The original steel cradle was replaced with 134 individually adjustable steel props, fitted with monitoring equipment. This allows for constant accurate reading of the stresses and more precise application of support. During this work a new walkway was constructed to enable visitors to explore the ship below the waterline. It opened to the public in August 2020.

The lower mainmast of Victory was removed in 2021 for conservation which was the beginning of a major set of works to construct a large scaffold over the ship to allow for hull replanking over the next decade. The scaffold allows shipwrights access to the ship's hull to remove and replace the existing planking installed between the 1980s and 2000s. It also includes a visitor walkway on multiple levels to allow visitors to see the work being undertaken by the Museum's shipwrights.

A new restoration phase begun in 2022 and due to be completed in 2032, aims to conclude the planking of the hull and to continue the battle against the beetle that has caused so many problems since its discovery in 1932. Cranfield University is studying the insect in order to better understand its behaviour, particularly in relation to its wood-boring activity. The beetle's genome has also been sequenced by the Sanger Institute so better pesticides or alternative methods of control can be developed. The ten-year initiative is expected to cost £42 million. This latest restoration is being recorded in meticulous detail and over 3000 high resolution photographs have been taken thus far. The images will be used to build a three-dimensional model of the ship.

Victory is the world's oldest commissioned warship and has served as the flagship of the First Sea Lord since October 2012. Part of the nation's Historic Fleet, she also fulfils a role as a museum ship, attracting around 350,000 visitors a year.

== Culture ==
The ship occupies a special place in the British psyche and is considered a potent symbol of the Royal Navy. A First Lord of the Admiralty, Leo Amery, once said that Victory embodied "...in a quite unique degree the history and tradition of British sea power ... the central shrine of our great naval tradition" while during the Naval Review of 1924, King George V declared "...that the country possessed no better stimulus to patriotic self-sacrifice than the flagship of Nelson". She has been a destination for royalty and heads of state including Kaiser Wilhelm II, who with his wife, the Kaiserin, made a state visit to Britain in 1889. The Kaiser was presented with a desk fashioned by Waring and Gillow from timber that once formed part of Victory. He would later, on 1 August 1914, sign an order on the desk, that would start the First World War. While serving as the Prime Minister, Winston Churchill embarked the ship in 1941 following an air raid on Portsmouth during the nights of 10 and 11 January.

In 1889, it was planned to tow Victory to Greenwich for the Royal Navy exhibition, featuring a display of more than 5,000 nautical objects. When the venue was changed to Chelsea, the large number of low bridges made this an almost impossible task, and instead a full-size model of the ship was constructed. When the exhibition was over, the replica was sold and rebuilt at its new home on the Isle of Man.

Victory has featured in and provided inspiration for popular media: W. S. Gilbert visited the ship in 1868 while researching his operetta H.M.S. Pinafore. A few glimpses of the ship, still afloat in 1918, are to be seen towards the end of Maurice Elvey's biopic of Nelson created in that year. Persuasion, a 1995 period drama by the BBC and based on Jane Austen's 1817 novel of the same name, featured scenes aboard Victory and her cutter. For the film Master and Commander: The Far Side of the World, the production team worked with Victory's curators to help accurately depict life aboard a warship during the Georgian era, while Russell Crowe, who portrayed Jack Aubrey in the film, boarded the ship to garner inspiration for his role. The same year, the fictional Royal Navy ship HMS Dauntless in the Disney film Pirates of the Caribbean: The Curse of the Black Pearl was based on her. She is used as a basis for the ship of the line in the opening song "Look Down" in the 2012 film adaptation of Les Misérables, which was filmed in HMNB Portsmouth, while the Great Cabin stood in for HMS Bellerophon in the 2023 biopic Napoleon, in a fictitious scene depicting a meeting between Napoleon and the Duke of Wellington.

== See also ==
- List of admirals who have hoisted their flag aboard HMS Victory
- USS Constitution in Boston, Massachusetts, US, the world's oldest commissioned naval vessel still afloat

== Sources ==
- Best, Nicholas (2005). Trafalgar – The Untold Story of the Greatest Sea Battle in History. London: The Orion Publishing Group Ltd. ISBN 0-297-84622-1.
- Christopher, John (2010). The HMS Victory Story. Stroud: The History Press. ISBN 978-0-7524-5605-8.
- Clowes, William Laird (1997) [1900]. The Royal Navy, A History from the Earliest Times to 1900. Vol. IV. London: Chatham Publishing. ISBN 1-86176-013-2.
- Clowes, William Laird (1997) [1900]. The Royal Navy, A History from the Earliest Times to 1900. Vol. V. London: Chatham Publishing. ISBN 1-86176-014-0.
- Davies, David (1996). Fighting Ships. Fulham Palace Road, London: Constable and Robinson Limited. ISBN 1-84119-469-7.
- Dull, Jonathan R. (2009). The Age of the Ship of the Line. Barnsley: Seaforth Publishing. ISBN 978-1-84832-549-4.
- Eastland, Jonathan; Ballantyne, Iain (2011). HMS Victory – First Rate 1765. Barnsley: Seaforth Publishing, Pen and Sword Books. ISBN 978-1-84832-094-9.
- Falconer, William; Burney, William (1830). A New and Universal Dictionary of the Marine; being a copious explanation of the technical terms and phrases usually employed in the construction, equipment, machinery, movements, and military, as well as naval operations of ships: with such parts of astronomy and navigation as will be found useful to practical navigators. London: T. Cadell and W. Davies. OCLC 1752876.
- Goodwin, Peter (2004). Nelson's Victory – 101 Questions & Answers about HMS Victory. London: Conway. ISBN 9-780851-779881.
- Goodwin, Peter (2015). HMS Victory – Pocket Manual 1805. London: Conway. ISBN 978-1-84486-260-3.
- Harris, Nicholas (1846). The Dispatches and Letters of Vice Admiral Lord Viscount Nelson, with notes (Volume V). London: H. Colburn. OCLC 1043045198.
- Ireland, Bernard (2000). Naval Warfare in the Age of Sail. Hammersmith, London: Harper Collins Publishing. ISBN 0-00-762906-0.
- James, William (1837) [1827]. The Naval History of Great Britain, Volume I, 1793–1796. London: Richard Bentley. OCLC 634321885.
- Konstam, Angus (2009). British Napoleonic Ship-of-the-Line. Botley, Oxford.: Osprey Publishing. ISBN 978-1-84176-308-8.
- Lavery, Brian (1983). The Ship of the Line. Vol. 1: The development of the battlefleet 1650–1850. London: Conway Maritime Press. ISBN 0-85177-252-8.
- Lavery, Brian (2015). Nelson's Victory – 250 Years of War and Peace. London: Seaforth Publishing. ISBN 978-1-84832-232-5.
- Longridge, Charles N. (1981). The Anatomy of Nelson's Ships. Naval Institute Press. ISBN 0-87021-077-7.
- McGowan, Alan (2003). HMS Victory: Her Construction, Career and Restoration. London: Caxton Editions. ISBN 1-84067-532-2.
- McKay, John (2000). The 100-Gun Ship Victory. Anova Books Ltd. ISBN 978-1-84486-223-8.
- Rodger, N.A.M (2005). The Command of the Ocean. London: Penguin Books. ISBN 0-14-028896-1.
- Sayer, Capt. Frederick (1862). The History of Gibraltar and of its Political Relation to Events in Europe. London: Saunders, Otley & Co. OCLC 433276515.
- Seymour, Sir Edward H. (1911). My Naval Career and Travels. London: Smith, Elder & Co.
- Stilwell, Alexander (2005). The Trafalgar Companion. Oxford: Osprey Publishing. ISBN 1-84176-835-9.
- Sullivan, Anthony (2017). Man of War: The Fighting Life of Admiral James Saumarez. Barnsley: Frontline. ISBN 978-1-52670-651-5.
- Vincent, Edgar (2003). Nelson: Love & Fame. London: Yale University Press. ISBN 0-300-10260-7.
- Warwick, Peter (September 2005). Voices from the Battle of Trafalgar. David & Charles. ISBN 0-7153-2000-9.
- Willis, Sam (2013). In the Hour of Victory – The Royal Navy at War in the Age of Nelson. London: Atlantic Books Ltd. ISBN 978-0-85789-570-7.
- Wilson, Ben (2013). Empire of the Deep. London: Weidenfeld & Nicolson. ISBN 978-0-297-86408-0.
- Winfield, Rif (2007). British Warships in the Age of Sail 1714–1792: Design, Construction, Careers and Fates. Seaforth Publishing. ISBN 978-1-84415-700-6.
- Winfield, Rif (2005). British Warships in the Age of Sail 1793–1817: Design, Construction, Careers and Fates. Seaforth Publishing. ISBN 978-1-84415-717-4.
- Winfield, Rif (2010). First Rate: The Greatest Warships of the Age of Sail. Annapolis, Maryland: Naval Institute Press. ISBN 978-1-59114-264-5.
- Woodman, Richard (1998). The Victory of Seapower. London: Caxton Editions. ISBN 184067-3591.
- A Committee of the Council, ed. (2022) [1885]. Quarterly Journal of the Royal Meteorological Society. Vol. XI. London: Edward Stanfod. ISBN 9780282699567.
