= HMS Deptford (1732) =

Ship of the line of the Royal Navy

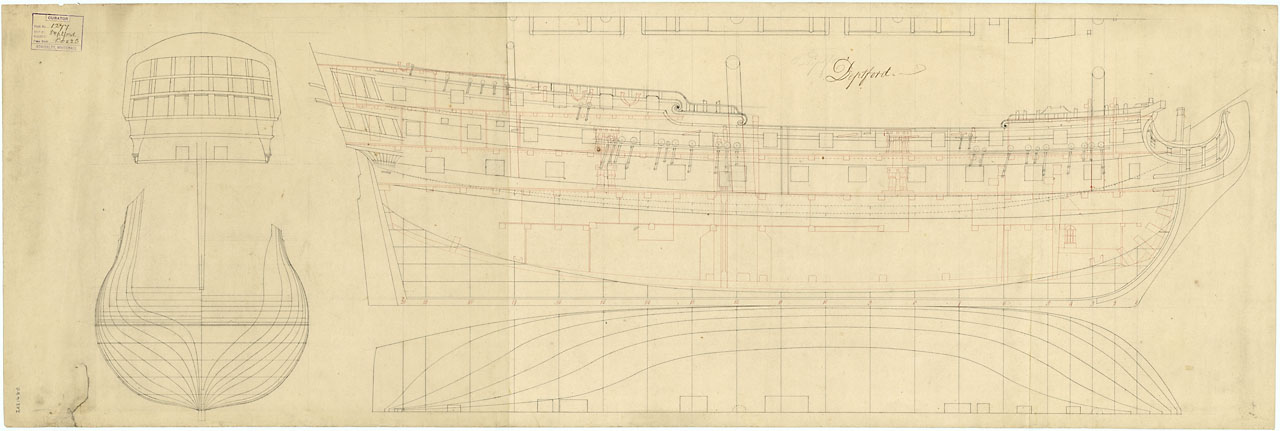
- Deptford

History

Great Britain
- Name: HMS Deptford
- Ordered: 3 May 1726
- Builder: Deptford Dockyard
- Launched: 22 August 1732
- Fate: Sold, 1767

General characteristics
- Class & type: 1719 Establishment 60-gun fourth rate ship of the line
- Tons burthen: 951 (bm)
- Length: 144 ft (43.9 m) (gundeck)
- Beam: 39 ft (11.9 m)
- Depth of hold: 16 ft 5 in (5.0 m)
- Propulsion: Sails
- Sail plan: Full-rigged ship
- Armament: Gundeck: 24 × 24-pounder guns; Upper gundeck: 26 × 9-pounder guns; QD: 8 × 6-pounder guns; Fc: 2 × 6-pounder guns

HMS Deptford was a 60-gun fourth rate ship of the line of the Royal Navy, built to the dimensions of the 1719 Establishment at Deptford Dockyard, and launched on 22 August 1732.

In 1752, she was cut down to a 50-gun ship.

On 31 January 1759 Montagu and Deptford chased a French privateer that Montagu captured the next day. The privateer was Marquis de Martigny, of Granville. She had a crew of 104 men under the command of M. Le Crouse, and was armed with twenty 6-pounder guns.

In 1761 Deptford sailed to Jamaica carrying a timekeeper built by John Harrison, as a part of a series of experiments to determine longitude at sea.

== Fate ==
Deptford was sold out of the navy in 1767.
