= HMS Montagu (1757) =

Ship of the line of the Royal Navy

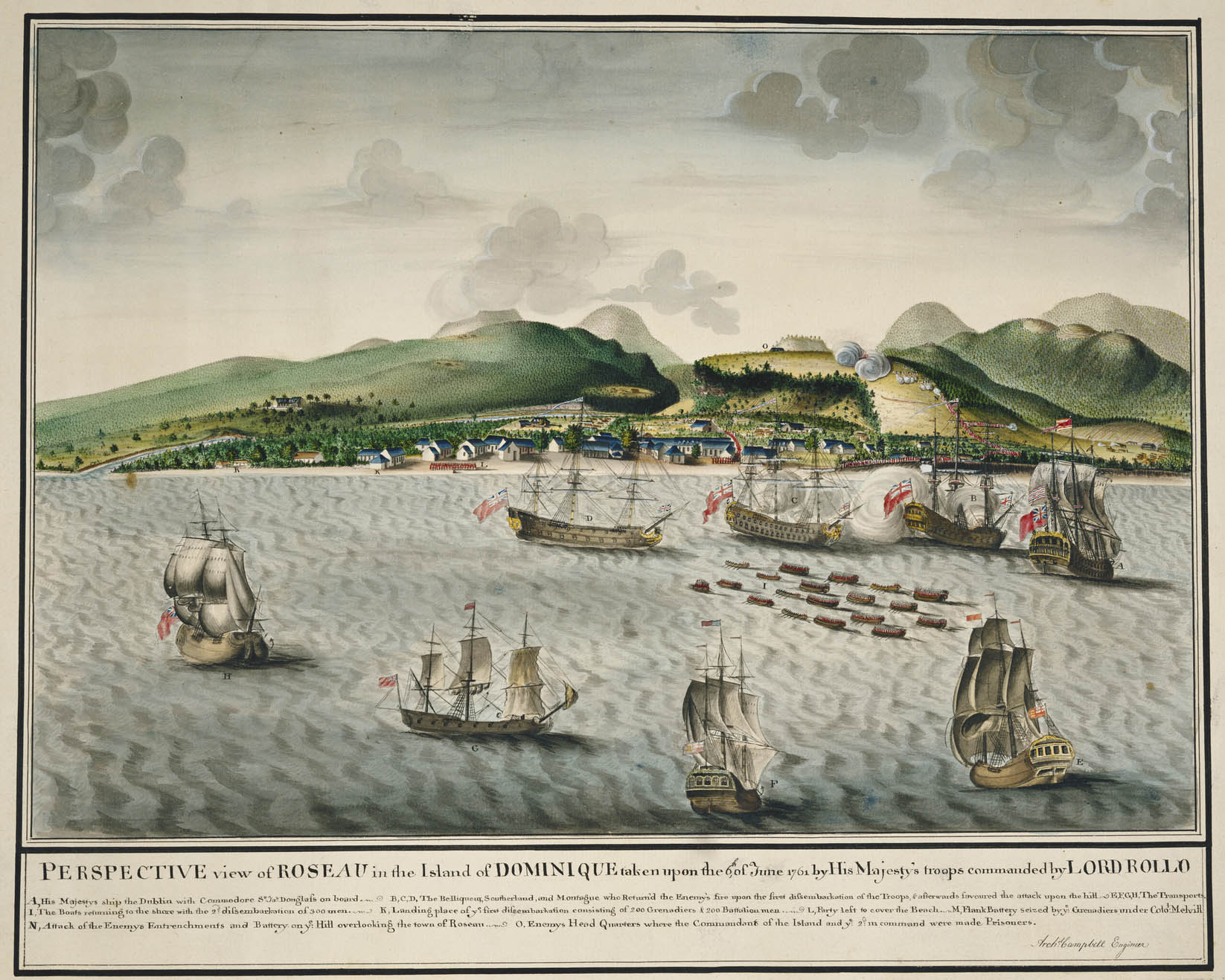
- Montagu (third from left) off Roseau on 6 June 1761

History

Great Britain
- Name: HMS Montague
- Ordered: 12 July 1750
- Builder: Sheerness Dockyard
- Launched: 15 September 1757
- Fate: Sunk as a breakwater, 1774

General characteristics
- Class & type: 1750 amendments 60-gun fourth rate ship of the line
- Tons burthen: 1245 (bm)
- Length: 157 ft 3 in (47.9 m) (gundeck)
- Beam: 42 ft (12.8 m)
- Depth of hold: 18 ft 6 in (5.6 m)
- Propulsion: Sails
- Sail plan: Full-rigged ship
- Armament: Gundeck: 24 × 24-pounder guns; Upper gundeck: 26 × 12-pounder guns; QD: 8 × 6-pounder guns; Fc: 2 × 6-pounder guns

HMS Montagu was a 60-gun fourth rate ship of the line of the Royal Navy, designed by Edward Allin and built at Sheerness Dockyard to the standard draught for 60-gun ships as specified by the 1745 Establishment, amended in 1750, and launched on 15 September 1757.

On 31 January 1759 Montagu and Deptford chased a French privateer that Montague captured the next day. The privateer was Marquis de Martigny, of Granville. She had a crew of 104 men under the command of M. Le Crouse, and was armed with twenty 6-pounder guns.

Then on 15 February, Montagu captured the French privateer cutter Hardi Mendicant, of Dunkirk. Hardi Mendicant had a crew of 60 men under the command of M. Jean Meuleauer, and was armed with eight 6-pounder guns.

In 1761 Montagu participated in the invasion of Dominica. The expedition to Dominica which landed on 6 June 1761 was led by Colonel Andrew Rollo, the Brigadier-General in America who was in command of 26,000 troops, and Commodore James Douglas, Commander-in-Chief at the Leeward Islands, who commanded four ships of the line, the Montague, Sutherland, Belliqueux, his flagship the Dublin, and two frigates. The fighting lasted for two days, before the French forces surrendered.

== Fate ==
Montague served until 1774, when she was sunk to form part of a breakwater.
