= East Indies Fleet =

Formation of the Royal Navy, active from 1941 to 1952

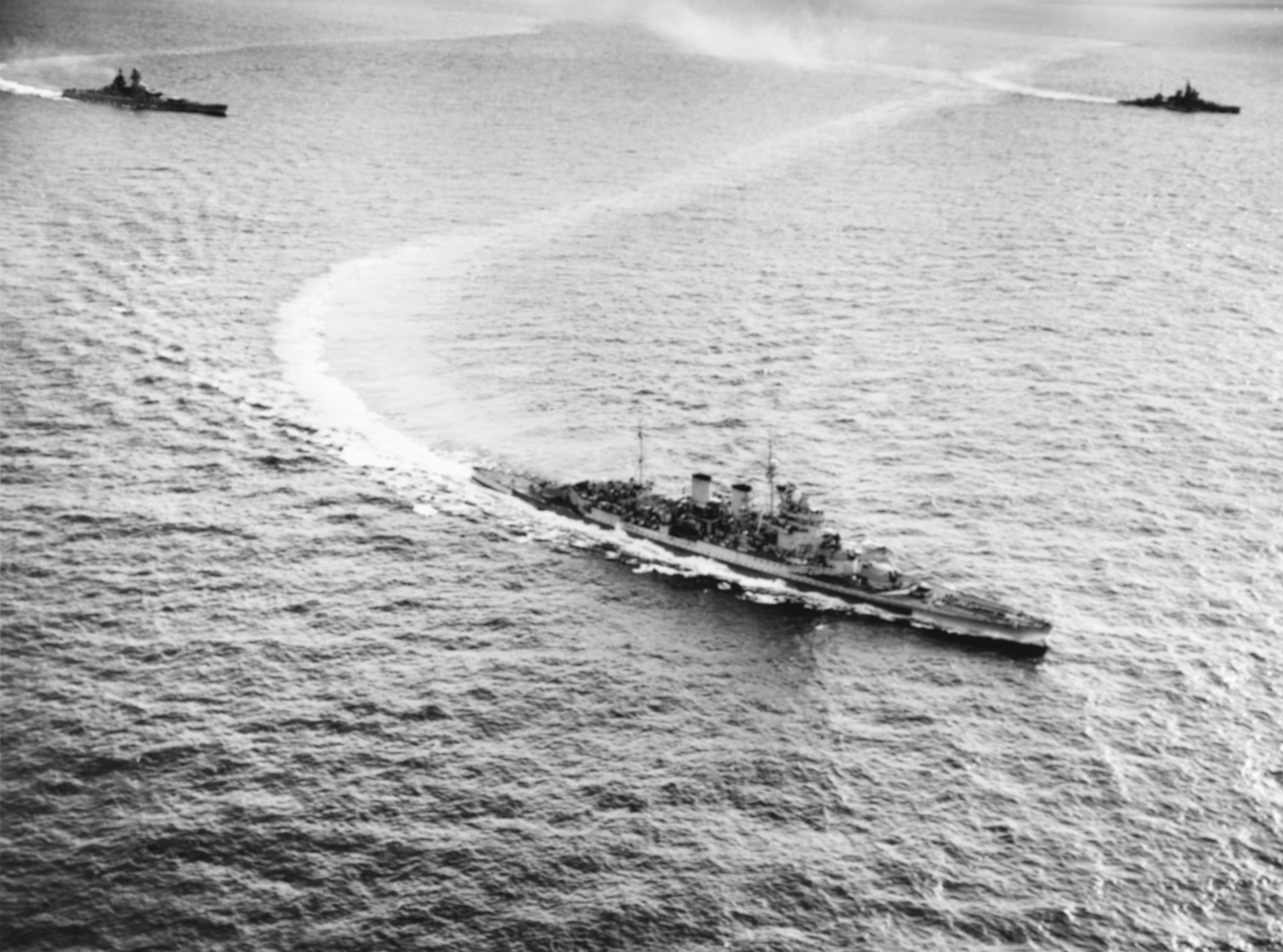
- HMS Renown in 1944 with other Eastern Fleet ships
- Active: 1941–1952
- Country: United Kingdom
- Branch: Royal Navy
- Type: Fleet
- Garrison/HQ: Trincomalee Naval Base, Ceylon; Singapore Naval Base (postwar)
- Engagements: Loss of Prince of Wales and Repulse; Indian Ocean raid Battle of Madagascar; Operation Dukedom; Operation Livery

Commanders
- Notable commanders: James Somerville; Bruce Fraser

The Eastern Fleet, later called the East Indies Fleet, was a fleet of the Royal Navy which existed between 1941 and 1952.

In 1904, the British First Sea Lord, Admiral Sir John Fisher, ordered that in the event of war the three main commands in the Far East, the East Indies Squadron, the China Station, and the Australian Squadron, should all come under one command called the Eastern Fleet based in Singapore. The Commander-in-Chief, China would then take command. During the First World War, the squadrons retained their distinct identities and 'Eastern Fleet' was used only as a general term. The three-squadron structure continued until the Second World War and the beginning of hostilities with the Empire of Japan, when the Eastern Fleet was formally constituted on 8 December 1941, amalgamating the East Indies Squadron and the China Squadron.

During the war, it included many ships and personnel from other navies, including those of the Netherlands, Australia, New Zealand, and the United States. On 22 November 1944 the Eastern Fleet was re-designated East Indies fleet and continued to be based in Trincomalee. Following its re-designation its remaining ships formed the British Pacific Fleet. In December 1945 the British Pacific Fleet was disbanded and its forces were absorbed into the East Indies fleet. In 1952 the East Indies Fleet was renamed the Far East Fleet.

== Background ==
Until the Second World War, the Indian Ocean had been a British "lake". It was ringed by significant British and Commonwealth possessions and much of the strategic supplies needed in peace and war had to pass across it: i.e. Persian oil, Malayan rubber, Indian tea, Australian and New Zealand foodstuffs. Britain also used Australian and New Zealand manpower; hence, safe passage for British cargo ships was critical.

At the outbreak of war, Nazi Germany's Kriegsmarine used auxiliary cruisers (converted merchant ships) and the "pocket battleship" Admiral Graf Spee to threaten the sea lanes and tie down the Royal Navy. In mid-1940, Italy declared war and their vessels based in Italian East Africa posed a threat to the supply routes through the Red Sea. Worse was to come when the Japanese declared war in December 1941 and, after Pearl Harbor, the sinking by air attack of the battleship Prince of Wales and battlecruiser Repulse, and the occupation of Malaya, Singapore and the Dutch East Indies, there was an aggressive threat from the east.

This threat became a reality during the Indian Ocean raid when an overwhelming Japanese naval force operated in the eastern Indian Ocean, sinking an aircraft carrier and other warships, and disrupting freight traffic along the Indian east coast. At this stage, the Chief of the Imperial General Staff, General Sir Alan Brooke wrote of the situation in 14 April 1942:

We were at the time literally hanging on by our eye-lids! Australia and India were threatened by the Japanese, we had temporarily lost control of the Indian Ocean, the Germans were threatening Iran and our oil, Auchinleck was in precarious straits in the desert, and the submarine sinkings were heavy.

== Early war years ==
Until 1941, the main threat to British interests in the region was the presence of German commerce raiders (auxiliary cruisers) and submarines. The fleet had trade protection as its first priority and was required to escort convoys and eliminate the raiders. The Germans had converted merchant ships to act as commerce raiders and allocated supply ships to maintain them. The location and destruction of these German raiders consumed much British naval effort until the last raider – Michel – was sunk in October 1943.

On 10 June 1940, the entry of Italy into the war introduced a new threat to the oil supply routes from the Persian Gulf, which passed through the Red Sea to the Mediterranean. The Italians controlled ports in Italian East Africa and Tianjin, China. The Italian Royal Navy (Regia Marina) presence in the Red Sea, Indian Ocean, and the western Pacific Ocean consisted of destroyers, submarines, and a small number of armed merchantmen. The majority of these were based at Massawa in Eritrea as part of the Italian Red Sea Flotilla, including seven destroyers and eight submarines. Damage to British destroyers at this time included Kimberley which was crippled by Italian shore batteries.

The Italian naval forces in East Africa were caught in a vice. To put to sea invited heavy British reaction, while to stay in ports threatened by British and Commonwealth forces became impossible. In 1941, during the East African Campaign, these ports were captured by the British.

== Singapore ==
Before the fall of Singapore, the Eastern Fleet's naval base at Singapore (HM Naval Base) was part of the British Far East Command. British defence planning in the area was based on two assumptions. The first was that the United States would remain as an effective ally in the western Pacific Ocean, with a fleet based at Manila, which would be available as a forward base for British warships. Secondly, the technical capabilities and aggression of the Imperial Japanese Navy were underestimated. In these circumstances, with the Japanese fleet engaged by the United States Navy (USN), the Admiralty planned to send four Revenge-class battleships to Singapore to provide defensive firepower and a British presence. The British assumptions were destroyed on 7 December 1941: the impact of the Japanese attack on Pearl Harbor denied substantial USN support to the British defence of the "Malay barrier" and made impossible the relief of American garrisons in the Philippines. Furthermore, Japanese capabilities exceeded expectations.

After the fall of France in June 1940, Japanese pressure on the Vichy authorities in French Indochina resulted in the granting of base and transit rights, albeit with significant restrictions. Despite this, in September 1940, the Japanese launched an invasion of that country. The bases thus acquired in Indochina allowed extended Japanese air cover of the invasion forces bound for Malaya and for the Dutch East Indies. In these circumstances, Prince of Wales and Repulse, which were dispatched to intercept the invasion force, were vulnerable to concerted air attacks from the Japanese bases in Indochina and, without their own air cover, they were sunk in December 1941.

After the sinking of Prince of Wales and Repulse, Admiral Sir Geoffrey Layton assumed command of the Eastern Fleet. The fleet withdrew first to Java and, following the fall of Singapore, to Trincomalee, Ceylon (now Sri Lanka).

== Indian Ocean retreat ==
Roskill writes in the War at Sea, Vol. II that:

Admiral Somerville arrived at Colombo on the 26th of [March 1942], and he then took over command of the Eastern Fleet from Admiral Layton. His fleet consisted of the two large carriers Indomitable and Formidable, the small carrier HMS Hermes, the battleships Warspite (recently returned from repairing battle damage received off Crete in America), Resolution, Ramillies, Royal Sovereign and Revenge, two heavy and five light cruisers (including the Dutch Heemskerck), sixteen destroyers and seven submarines.

On 31 March Somerville decided to divide the Fleet into two: Force A and Force B. Force A consisted of the battleship Warspite, the aircraft carriers HMS Indomitable, and HMS Formidable, and three cruisers. Force B was based around the slow Revenge-class battleships of the 3rd Battle Squadron, under Vice-Admiral Algernon Willis. Neither individually nor together could the two Eastern Fleet forces challenge a determined Japanese naval assault.

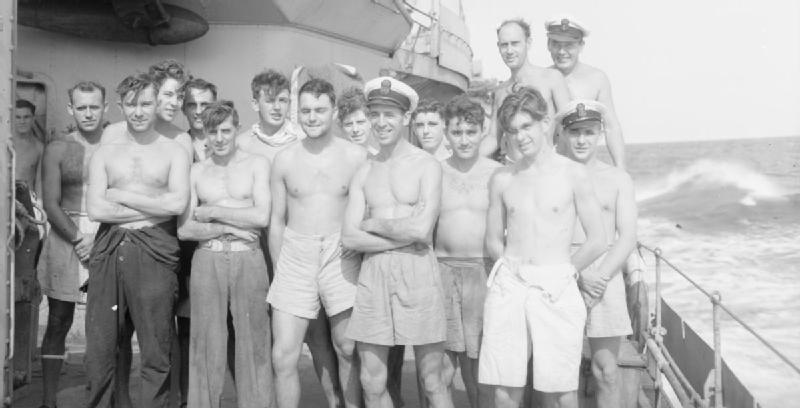
On board HMS Racehorse, destroyer of the Eastern Fleet

When Admiral Somerville inspected the base at Trincomalee, its deficiencies were clear to him. He found the port inadequate, vulnerable to a determined attack, and open to spying. An isolated island base with a safe, deep anchorage in a suitably strategic position was required. Addu Atoll, southernmost of the Maldives in the Indian Ocean, 600 miles southwest of Ceylon, met the requirements and it was secretly developed as a fleet anchorage.

Following the Japanese capture of the Andaman Islands, the main elements of the Fleet retreated to Addu Atoll. On 7 April Somerville was given discretion by the Admiralty to send the slow Revenge-class battleships of Force B all the way back to Kilindini in East Africa, relatively safe from Japanese attack. The Indian Ocean raid by Chuichi Nagumo cost the Fleet the carrier Hermes, the cruisers HMS Dorsetshire and HMS Cornwall, the Australian destroyer HMAS Vampire, and two tankers. Beyond the withdrawal of Force B, the Admiralty warned that Colombo could not be used for the present. Somerville kept Force A in Indian waters "to be ready to deal with any attempt by the enemy to command those waters with light forces only."

Later, the fleet in the Indian Ocean was then gradually reduced to little more than a convoy escort force as other commitments called for the more modern, powerful ships. In May 1942, the Eastern Fleet supported the invasion of Madagascar, Operation Ironclad. It was aimed at thwarting any attempt by Japanese vessels to use naval bases on the Vichy French controlled territory. During the invasion, vessels of the Eastern Fleet were confronted by vessels of the French Navy and submarines of the Imperial Japanese Navy.

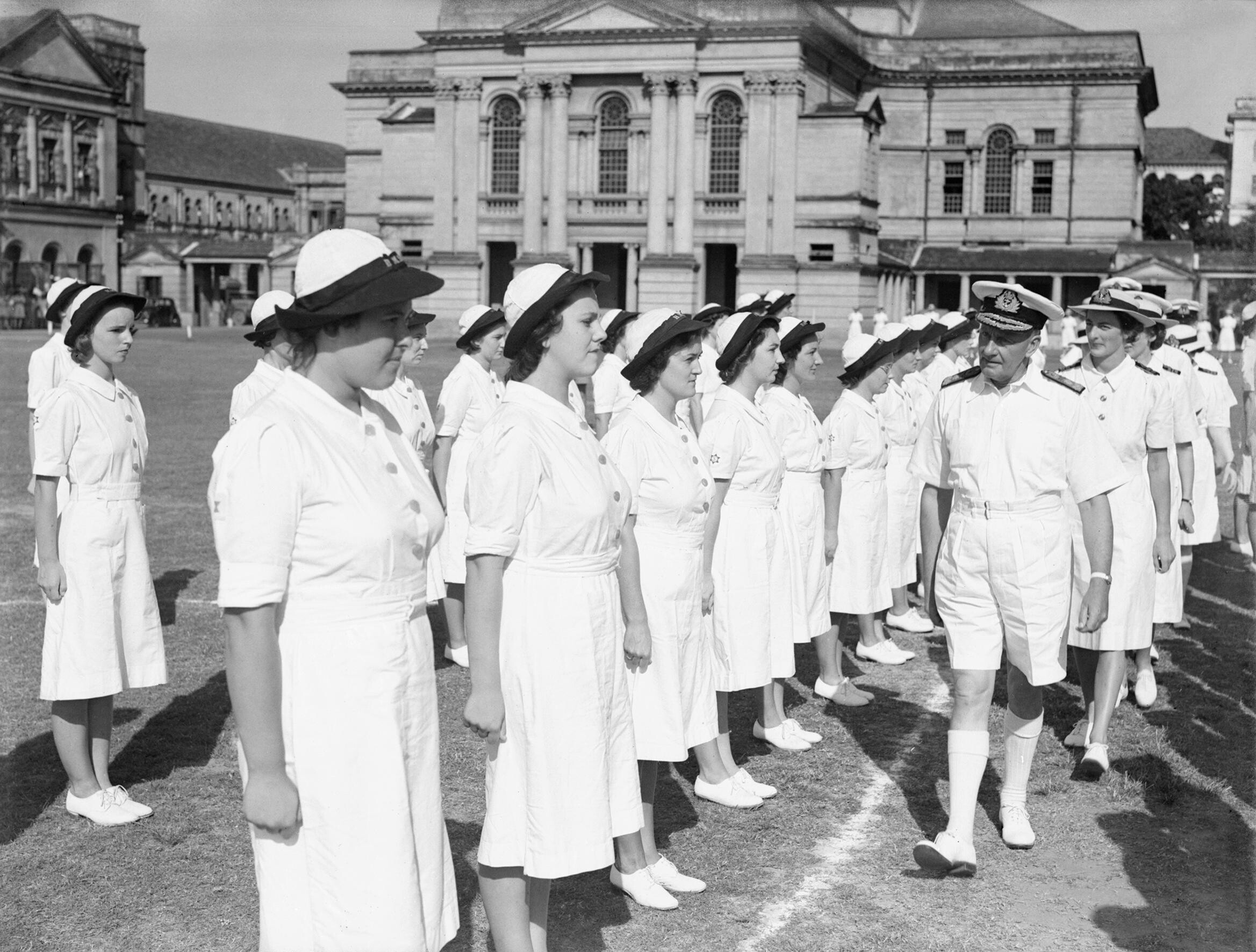
Admiral Sir James Somerville, Commander-in-Chief Eastern Fleet, in Colombo, British Ceylon, 17 July 1944

From October 1943, the Eastern Fleet was the maritime component of South East Asia Command, including responsibilities beyond the SEAC area. The fleet reached full operational strength again by 1944. On 22 November 1944 the Eastern Fleet was split into the British Pacific Fleet, receiving the majority of the ships, and the remnant, which became known as the East Indies Fleet.

Apart from the Eastern Fleet battle forces, it also included a submarine force, to hinder Japan from using sea lanes between Burma and Singapore; and a large supporting escort force, responsible for protecting convoy roues between Suez (Red Sea) and India, and between the Cape of Good Hope and India.

The Eastern Fleet included, from time to time, as well as British warships, a number of warships from the British Dominions of Australia and New Zealand as well as other Allied nations, such as the French battleship Richelieu, other ships from the Free French Naval Forces, the Netherlands, and the United States.

== Allied Indian Ocean strikes ==
After the departure of the main battle forces during February 1942, the Indian Ocean was left with mostly escort carriers and older battleships as the core of its naval forces. Allied advances in the Mediterranean and northern Europe during 1943 and 1944, however, released naval resources. As a result, more British aircraft carriers entered the area; added to the force were the battlecruiser Renown, the battleships Howe, Queen Elizabeth, Valiant and supporting warships. Preparations were put in hand for a more aggressive stance in the Indian Ocean and for British naval participation in the wide spaces of the Pacific Ocean. Agreement had been reached, after objections from Admiral Ernest King USN, but new procedures would need to be learnt by naval crews and Fleet Air Arm (FAA) aircrew. To this end, Operation Diplomat, a training exercise, took place in late March 1944. The objective was for the fleet to rendezvous with a group of tankers (escorted by the Dutch cruiser HNLMS Tromp) and practice refuelling at sea procedures. The ships then rendezvoused with United States Navy Task Group 58.5, the aircraft carrier USS Saratoga and three destroyers.

Admiral King requested that, during April, the Eastern Fleet should engage Japanese forces in their area and hold them there to reduce the opposition to an American seaborne assault on Hollandia and Aitape on the north coast of Netherlands New Guinea. In response, the Fleet, including Task Group 58.5, carried out Operation Cockpit, an air attack on Sabang, off Sumatra. Surprise was achieved: military and oil installations were heavily damaged by the attacks, aggravating Japanese fuel shortages. The American involvement was extended to capitalise on the success with a second attack, this time on Surabaya, eastern Java, on 17 May (Operation Transom). The distances for this operation necessitated replenishment at sea. Again, the defenders were unprepared and significant damage was inflicted on the port and its military and oil infrastructures. Saratoga and her destroyers returned to the Pacific from 18 May after what Admiral Somerville called "a profitable and very happy association of Task Group 58.5 with the Eastern Fleet".

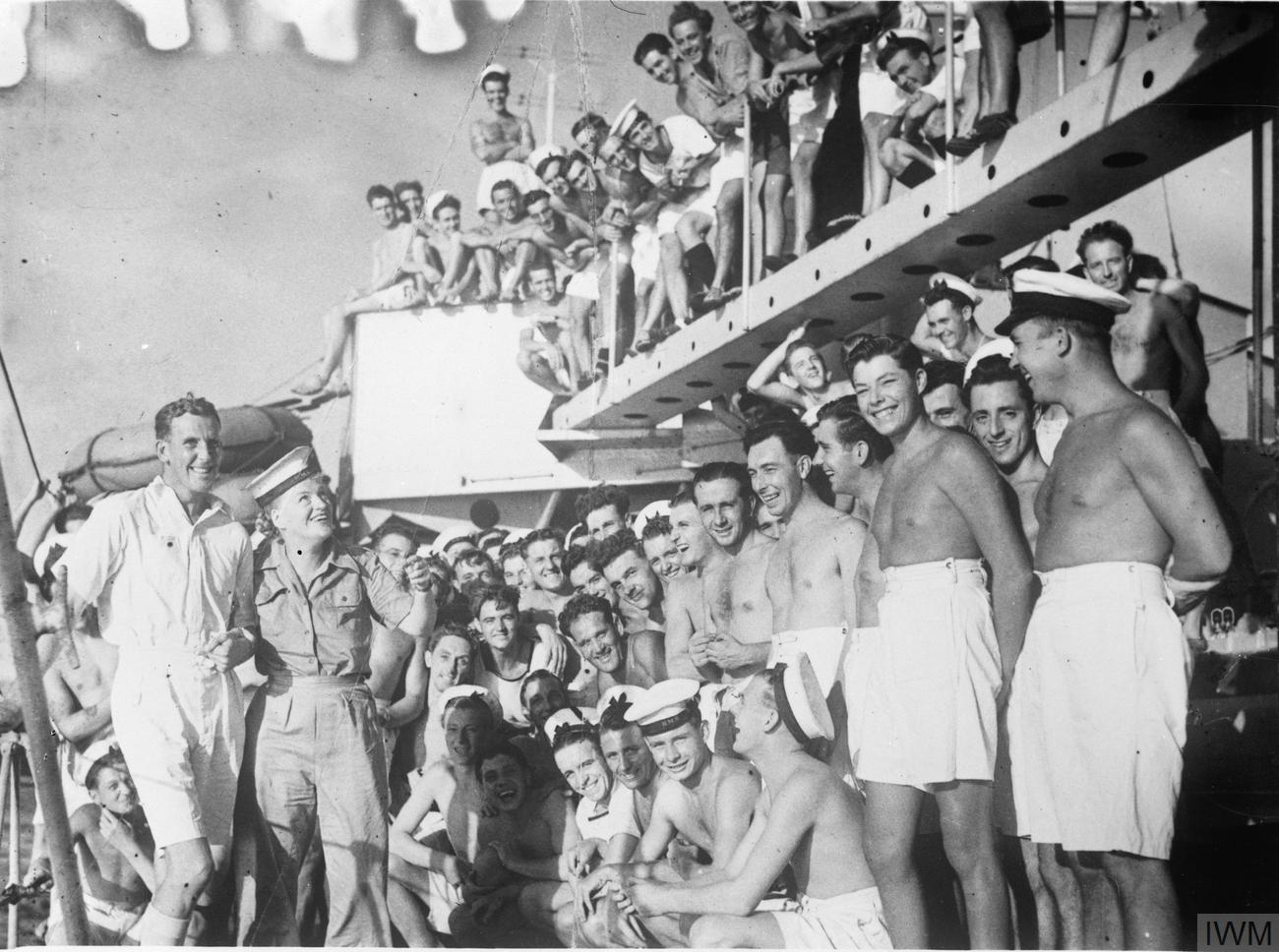
Gracie Fields with the British East Indies Fleet, Trincomalee, Ceylon, 20 October 1945

At the end of August 1944, Admiral Somerville was relieved as Commander-in-Chief Eastern Fleet by Admiral Sir Bruce Fraser, former Commander-in-Chief Home Fleet. The Eastern Fleet was greatly augmented by units intended for the Pacific and on 4 January 1945, the carriers Indomitable and Indefatigable carried out an attack on oil refineries at Pangkalan Brandon in Sumatra (Operation Lentil). The final attacks were flown as Force 63 was en route for Sydney, Australia to become the British Pacific Fleet. Operation Meridian was a series of air attacks upon the oil refineries at Pladjoe, north of Palembang, Java and at Soengei Gerong, Sumatra. Although successful, these were not as smooth as earlier attacks. Three crews (nine men) of Fleet Air Arm were captured by the Japanese during the Palembang raid. They were taken to Singapore where they were tortured and imprisoned; finally in August 1945 they were executed by the Japanese military authorities four days after the Japanese surrender.

On 15–16 May 1945, the British fought the Battle of the Malacca Strait; the 26th Destroyer Flotilla (composed of Saumarez, Venus, Verulam, Vigilant and Virago) sank the Japanese heavy cruiser Haguro in the Malacca Straits using torpedoes.

== Eastern Fleet senior officers ==
=== Commanders-in-Chief, Eastern Fleet ===
Commander-in-Chief, Eastern Fleet
	Rank	Flag	Name	Term
1	Admiral	Admiral - Royal Navy	Sir Tom Phillips	October – 10 December 1941
2	Vice-Admiral	Vice-Admiral - Royal Navy	Sir Geoffrey Layton	10 December 1941 – 12 February 1942
3	Vice-Admiral	Vice-Admiral - Royal Navy	Sir James Somerville	12 February 1942 – 6 April 1942 (promoted to Adm.
4	Admiral	Admiral - Royal Navy	Sir James Somerville	6 April 1942 – 22 August 1944
5	Admiral	Admiral - Royal Navy	Sir Bruce Fraser	22 August 1944 -December 1944 – becomes C-in-C British Pacific Fleet

=== Vice-Admiral Commanding, 3rd Battle Squadron & Second-in-Command, Eastern Fleet ===
Vice-Admiral, Commanding 3rd Battle Squadron & Second-in-command, Eastern Fleet
	Rank	Flag	Name	Term
1	Vice Admiral	Vice-Admiral - Royal Navy	Algernon Willis	26 February 1942 – February 1943
2	Rear-Admiral	Rear-Admiral - Royal Navy	William Tennant	February–October 1943
3	Vice-Admiral	Vice-Admiral - Royal Navy	Sir Arthur Power	January 1944 – November 1944
4	Vice-Admiral	Vice-Admiral - Royal Navy	Sir Harold Walker	November 1944 – 1946

=== Chief of Staff, Eastern Fleet ===
Chief of Staff, Eastern Fleet
	Rank	Flag	Name	Term
1	Rear-Admiral	Rear-Admiral - Royal Navy	Arthur Palliser	December 1941 – January 1942
2	Commodore		Ralph Edwards	March 1942 – August 1944

=== Rear-Admiral, Eastern Fleet Aircraft Carriers ===
This officer supervised the Fleet's aircraft carriers and naval air stations. Air stations included RNAS China Bay (Trincomalee), RNAS Colombo Racecourse (HMS Bherunda), Coimbatore, and RNAS Katukurunda.

Rear-Admiral, Eastern Fleet Aircraft Carriers
	Rank	Flag	Name	Term
1	Rear-Admiral	Rear-Admiral - Royal Navy	Denis Boyd	18 February 1941 – December 1942
2	Rear-Admiral	Rear-Admiral - Royal Navy	Clement Moody	1 December 1943 – August 1944

=== Flag Officer Commanding, Red Sea and Canal Area, 1943–44 ===
Flag Officer Commanding, Red Sea and Canal Area
	Rank	Flag	Name	Term
1	Rear-Admiral	Rear-Admiral - Royal Navy	Ronald Hallifax	18 May 1942 – 6 November 1943 (died in office)
2	Rear-Admiral	Rear-Admiral - Royal Navy	John Waller	6 November – 28 December 1943
3	Commodore		Douglas Young-Jamieson	28 December 1943 – 31 October 1944

=== Flag Officer, East Africa and Admiral Superintendent, H.M. Dockyard, Kilindini ===
Responsible to the Commander-in-Chief, Eastern Fleet, from April 1942 to September 1943 then transferred back under the East Indies Fleet.

Flag Officer, East Africa
	Rank	Flag	Name	Term	Notes/Ref
1	Rear-Admiral	Rear-Admiral - Royal Navy	Peter Reid	April 1942 – October 1942	
2	Commodore		Charles Stuart	October 1942 – September, 1943	

With the Flag Officer, East Africa, was the Commodore, Naval Air Stations, East Africa, which was within the Eastern Fleet command from April 1942 to September 1943 then was transferred back to the East Indies Fleet.

=== Senior Naval Officer, Persian Gulf ===
The Senior Naval Officer, Persian Gulf was responsible for administering Royal Navy ships and establishments in the Persian Gulf. He was initially located at Basra, in Mandatory Iraq, then later at HMS Juffair in Bahrain from 1901 to 1972. His command was part of the East Indies Station, then the Eastern Fleet, then the East Indies Fleet.

There were also Naval Officers-in-Charge at Basra and for the Hormuz.

=== Flag Officer, Malaya ===
The Flag Officer, Malaya commanded naval forces and establishments in Malaya including HMNB Singapore.

=== Naval Officers in Charge, ports and bases ===
Included:

- Naval Officer-in-Charge, Chittagong
- Naval Officer-in-Charge, Seychelles
- Naval Officer-in-Charge, Diego Suarez
- Naval Officer-in-Charge, Trincomalee

== East Indies Fleet senior officers ==
=== Commander-in-Chief, East Indies Fleet ===
Commander-in-Chief, East Indies Fleet
	Rank	Flag	Name	Term
1	Admiral	Admiral - Royal Navy	Sir Arthur Power	November 1944 – December 1945
2	Vice-Admiral	Vice-Admiral - Royal Navy	Sir Clement Moody	15 December 1945 – 8 March 1946
2	Vice-Admiral	Vice-Admiral - Royal Navy	Sir Denis Boyd	March 1946 – January 1948
3	Admiral	Admiral - Royal Navy	Sir Denis Boyd	January 1948 – January 1949
4	Vice-Admiral	Vice-Admiral - Royal Navy	Sir Patrick Brind	January 1949 – February 1951
5	Vice-Admiral	Vice-Admiral - Royal Navy	Sir Guy Russell	February 1951 – January 1952

=== Rear-Admiral, Commanding, 5th Cruiser Squadron and Second-in-Command, East Indies Fleet/Far East Fleet ===
Rear-Admiral, Commanding, 5th Cruiser Squadron and Second-in-Command, East Indies Fleet/Far East Fleet
	Rank	Flag	Name	Term
1	Rear-Admiral	Rear-Admiral - Royal Navy	Alexander Madden	1948 – 1950
2	Rear-Admiral	Rear-Admiral - Royal Navy	William Andrewes	17 December 1950 – October 1951
3	Rear-Admiral	Rear-Admiral - Royal Navy	Eric Clifford	circa 1953
4	Rear-Admiral	Rear-Admiral - Royal Navy	Gerald Gladstone	1953 – 1955

=== Chief of Staff, East Indies Fleet ===
Chief of Staff, East Indies Fleet
	Rank	Flag	Name	Term
1	Commodore		Edward Evans-Lombe	August 1944 – October 1944
2	Rear-Admiral	Rear-Admiral - Royal Navy	Edward Evans-Lombe	October 1944 – March 1946
3	Commodore		Stephen Carlill	March 1946 – August 1948
4	Commodore		Geoffrey Burghard	August 1948 – September 1950
5	Captain		Ralph Fisher	September 1950 – January 1952

=== Flag Officer, (Air), East Indies Fleet ===
This officer commanded the aircraft carriers and the naval air stations.

Flag Officer, (Air), East Indies Fleet
	Rank	Flag	Name	Term
1	Rear-Admiral	Rear-Admiral - Royal Navy	Clement Moody	August 1944 – November 1944
2	Rear-Admiral	Rear-Admiral - Royal Navy	Reginald Portal	November 1944 – March 1946
3	Rear-Admiral	Rear-Admiral - Royal Navy	Charles Woodhouse	March – July 1946
4	Rear-Admiral	Rear-Admiral - Royal Navy	Robin Bridge	July 1946 – February 1947
5	Vice-Admiral	Vice-Admiral - Royal Navy	George Creasy	February 1947 – 1948

=== Commodore (D), Commanding, Destroyer Flotillas, Eastern Fleet (and later East Indies Fleet) ===
Commodore (D), Commanding, Eastern Fleet Destroyer Flotillas
	Rank	Flag	Name	Term
1	Commodore		S. H. T. Harliss	9 June 1942 – December 1942
2	Commodore		Albert Poland	April 1944 – October 1944
3	Commodore		Stephen Carlill	March 1946 – August 1948
4	Commodore		Geoffrey Burghard	August 1948 – September 1950

=== Flag Officer, Ceylon, 1942–46 ===
	Rank	Flag	Name	Term
1	Rear-Admiral	Rear-Admiral - Royal Navy	Arthur Read	14 May 1942 – August 1943
2	Rear-Admiral	Rear-Admiral - Royal Navy	Victor Danckwerts	August 1943 – March 1944, (died in office)
3	Rear-Admiral	Rear-Admiral - Royal Navy	Gresham Nicholson	March 1944 – 1945
4	Rear-Admiral	Rear-Admiral - Royal Navy	John Mansfield	1945 -10 April 1946

=== Flag Officer Commanding, Royal Indian Navy ===
The Royal Indian Navy came under the command of the Commander-in-Chief, East Indies, on the outbreak of the Second World War and reverted to a separate command after the Japanese surrender.

Flag Officer Commanding, Royal Indian Navy
	Rank	Flag	Name	Term
1	Vice-Admiral	Vice-Admiral - Royal Navy	Sir Herbert Fitzherbert	December 1941 -22 March 1943
2	Vice-Admiral	Rear-Admiral - Royal Navy	John Henry Godfrey	22 March 1943 – 15 March 1946

In addition to the Vice-Admiral commanding, Rear-Admiral Oliver Bevir served as Senior Officer, Royal Naval Establishments, India, from June 1944 to July 1945.

== Subordinate naval formations ==
Units that served in the two fleets included:

Naval Units	Based at	Date	Notes
Force A	Trincomalee	March 1942 to June 1942	
Force B	Trincomalee/Kilidini	March 1942 to June 1942	
21st Aircraft Carrier Squadron	Trincomalee	March 1945 – December 1945	
1st Battle Squadron	Trincomalee	March 1942 to 1942	
3rd Battle Squadron	Trincomalee	January 1942 to December 1945	
4th Cruiser Squadron	Trincomalee then Singapore Naval Base	December 1947 to July 1954	
5th Cruiser Squadron	Trincomalee then Singapore Naval Base	January 1942 – May 1960	
2nd Destroyer Flotilla	Trincomalee	February 1942 to June 1943	
4th Destroyer Flotilla	Trincomalee	April 1943 to November 1944	
6th Destroyer Flotilla	Trincomalee	June 1945 –	
7th Destroyer Flotilla	Trincomalee	January 1942 to April 1945	
8th Destroyer Flotilla	Singapore	1947 to July 1951	re-designated 8th DSQ
11th Destroyer Flotilla	Trincomalee	February 1943 – 1945	transferred from Med Fleet
24th Destroyer Flotilla	Trincomalee	January to May 1945	
26th Destroyer Flotilla	Trincomalee	January 1945	
1st Destroyer Squadron	Singapore	1950 to April 1960	
8th Destroyer Squadron	Singapore	July 1951 – May 1963	renamed 24th ESQ
1st Escort Flotilla	Singapore	1946 to 1954	
4th Frigate Squadron	Singapore	January 1949 to August 1954	
6th Minesweeper Flotilla	Trincomalee	January 1945 to July 1947	transferred to Singapore
6th Minesweeper Flotilla	Singapore	August 1947 to 1951	placed in reserve
6th Minesweeper Squadron	Singapore	1951 to June 1954	new formation
7th Minesweeper Flotilla	Trincomalee	February 1945	
2nd Submarine Flotilla	Trincomalee	January 1945	
4th Submarine Division	Sydney	May to October 1949	
4th Submarine Flotilla	Trincomalee	January 1942 to October 1947	
4th Submarine Flotilla	Singapore	October 1947 to December 1948	
6th Submarine Flotilla	Trincomalee	February to August 1944	
2nd Submarine Flotilla	Trincomalee	January 1945	
4th Submarine Flotilla	Trincomalee then Singapore	January 1942 to October 1947	
6th Submarine Flotilla	Trincomalee	February to August 1944	
Persian Gulf Division	Juffair Naval Base	January 1942 to January 1954	
Red Sea Division	Aden Naval Base	February 1942 to January 1954	
60th Escort Group	Trincomalee	January to May 1945	11 ships
Aden-Bombay-Colombo Groups	Aden/Bombay/Colombo	4 February 1944 to January 1945	ABC 30 escorts
Aden Escort Forces	Aden	4 February 1944 to January 1945	15 escorts
Ceylon Escort Forces	Colombo	9 January 1943 to 4 February 1944	10 escorts
Kilidini Escort Forces	Kilidini	4 February 1944 to January 1945	8 escorts
Kilidini Escort Forces	Kilidini	January to May 1945	14 ships
Royal Indian Navy Escort Forces	Bombay	4 February 1944 to January 1945	8 escorts
