= Flag Officer, East Africa =

- Active: April 1942 – July 1945 (Flag Officer East Africa)
- Country: United Kingdom
- Branch: Royal Navy
- Part of: East Indies Station (1939–1941); Eastern Fleet (1942–1945); East Indies Station (1945–1958)
- Garrison/HQ: HMS Tana (RN base, Kilindini, Mombasa, Kenya (1942–1945)

During the First World War, the Commander-in-Chief at the Cape, Rear Admiral Herbert King-Hall, expended much effort to destroy the elusive German light cruiser Königsberg.

During the Second World War formation specifically for East Africa was established, commanded by the Flag Officer, East Africa.

== First World War: The Cape Station chases SMS Königsberg ==
In the early twentieth century the Royal Navy installation at Zanizibar was primarily used as a coaling station.

British forces' principal role was to protect British commerce from German surface raiders – seen as a priority in 1914–1915. As the likelihood of war with Germany increased, the Commander-in-Chief, Cape Station, Rear Admiral Herbert King-Hall, moved his ships in order to counter the threat posed by the German light cruiser Königsberg, based at Dar es Salaam. On 31 July 1914, the British protected cruiser HMS Pegasus sighted Königsberg leaving Dar es Salaam, but was unable to keep track of the faster German cruiser. King-Hall recognised that Königsberg outclassed Pegasus and intended that Pegasus should operate with the cruiser Astraea while his flagship Hyacinth operated independently to protect the trade routes around the Cape, but on 12 August, the Admiralty ordered Astraea to join Hyacinth off the Cape to escort troop convoys, leaving Pegasus unsupported at Zanzibar. On 20 September 1914, Königsberg surprised and sank Pegasus in the Battle of Zanzibar.

Königsberg then retreated into the Rufiji River to repair her engines. Before the repairs could be completed, British cruisers located Königsberg; the Navy List for April 1915 lists on the East Coast of Africa under Part XI, Other Foreign Stations, page 22 (1363), the light cruisers Hyacinth, Weymouth, and HMAS Pioneer. Unable to steam into the river to destroy Konigsberg, the Royal Navy ships set up a blockade. Aircraft were sent to join the effort and Squadron Commander Robert Gordon was appointed in January 1915 as commander of the Royal Naval Air Service in East Africa. After several attempts to sink the ship during the Battle of Rufiji Delta, the British sent two monitors, Mersey and Severn, to destroy the German cruiser. On 11 July 1915, the two monitors got close enough to severely damage Königsberg, forcing her crew to scuttle the ship.

After the seizure of German East Africa, the Royal Navy added a base in Tanganyika to the existing one at Zanzibar. Naval Officers-in-Charge were in post at Tanganyika (12 September 1918 – April 1919) and Zanzibar (20 November 1918 – 1919) later in the war.

Ships and units that served off East Africa included:

Units	Date
Three cruisers, monitors HMS Mersey and HMS Severn, an armed merchant cruiser	1915
Four cruisers, two AMCs, two monitors, HMS Manica, kite balloon ship, April–November 1916	1916
3 cruisers, 2 monitors, 1 AMC, 1 sloop, one gunboat	1917

== Second World War ==
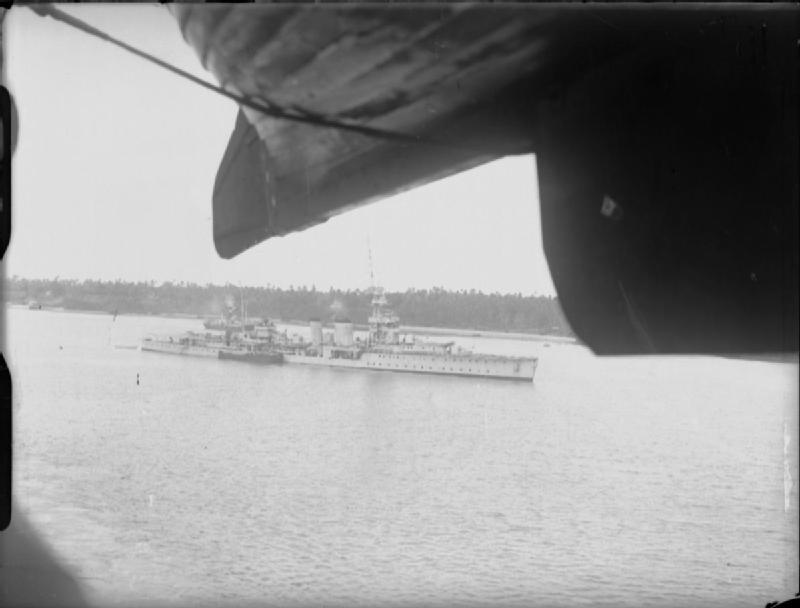
HMS Ceres at anchor in Mombasa Harbour

Kilindini, in the British Kenya Colony, became the temporary home of Force B, the old Revenge-class battleships of the Eastern Fleet, along with other ships, from early 1942, until the Japanese naval threat to Ceylon (now Sri Lanka) subsided. In the early hours of 7 April 1942 the Admiralty signalled to Admiral Somerville, Commander-in-Chief, Eastern Fleet, 'discretion' to withdraw the R-class battleships to Africa, as they might be 'more of a liability than an asset'. Somerville in return signaled two days later that he indeed would send the slow division, Force B, back to East Africa.

Upon the arrival of the Commander-in-Chief, Eastern Fleet, at Kilindini, on 10 May 1942 it appeared that "..[m]uch preliminary work, including berthing arrangements, had been completed by Vice Admiral, Second in Command (Vice Admiral A.U. Willis, CB, DSO) and the Flag Officer East Africa and Zanzibar (Rear Admiral A.D. Read), but available personnel and material were very scarce." Rear Admiral Read was then posted further east to take up the post of Flag Officer Ceylon.

On May 12, 1942, "..Rear Admiral C.G. Stuart, DSO, DSC, assumed duty as Flag Officer, East Africa and Zanzibar, with headquarters at Kilindini. He will operate and administrate local defence forces in his area and will be responsible for all East African bases and those in the Western Indian Ocean other than Addu Atoll." (Eastern Fleet War Diary) Stuart was subsequently Flag Officer East Africa & Zanzibar at HMS Sheba in Aden from 12.05.1942 - 02.09.1942; Flag Officer East Africa [HMS Tana, Kilindini, 03.09.1942 - 17.02.1943], and then Flag Officer East Africa & Admiral Superintendent Kilindini [HMS Tana, 18.02.1943 - 26.04.1944].

Royal Naval Air Stations (RNAS) Kilidini (HMS Kipanga) and RNAS Mackinnon Road (HMS Kipanga II) were established and used between 1942 and 1944. RAF Port Reitz nearby was also used by the Fleet Air Arm while the Eastern Fleet was in the area. Rear-Admiral F. Elliott served as Commodore, Naval Air Stations, East Africa, from 19 August 1943 until 1 January 1945.

Local British naval reserve forces included the Royal Naval Volunteer Reserve in Kenya; Tanganyika Naval Volunteer Force (1939–1942), responsible for minesweeping, coast watching and coastal patrol duties and manning of signal stations, and the Zanzibar Naval Volunteer Force (also 1939–1942). From 1942 the two were merged into the East African Naval Force, active until 13 May 1952, and then renamed the Royal East African Navy until 1962. Kilidini became the force's headquarters.

=== Flag Officers East Africa 1942-45 ===
	Rank	Flag	Name	Title	Term	Notes/Ref
Flag Officer, East Africa
1	Rear-Admiral	Rear-Admiral - Royal Navy	A.D. Read	Flag Officer East Africa and Zanzibar	4 May 1942 - 12 May 1942	
2	Commodore		Charles Stuart		October 1942 – 8 February 1943	
3	Rear-Admiral	Rear-Admiral - Royal Navy	Charles Stuart		8 February 1943 – 11 January 1944.	
4	Rear-Admiral	Rear-Admiral - Royal Navy	Richard Shelley	Flag Officer East Africa. From 1 February 1944 also appointed Admiral Superintendent HM Dockyard Kilindini	11 January 1944 – January 1945	
5	Commodore		Sir Philip Bowyer-Smyth	Commodore East Africa	25 November 1944 – July 1945	
