= Arthur Power =

Royal Navy Admiral of the Fleet (1889–1960)

Admiral of the Fleet Sir Arthur Power GCB GBE CVO
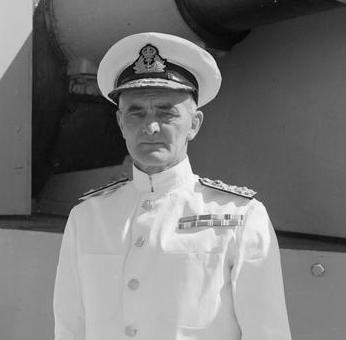
- Power in 1942
- Born: 12 April 1889; London, England
- Died: 28 January 1960 (aged 70); Royal Naval Hospital, Haslar, England
- Relatives: Vice Admiral Sir Arthur Mackenzie Power (son)
- Military career
- Allegiance: United Kingdom
- Branch: Royal Navy
- Service years: 1904–1953
- Rank: Admiral of the Fleet
- Commands: Channel and Southern North Sea Command (1952); Commander-in-Chief, Portsmouth (1950–52); Mediterranean Fleet (1948–50); Second Sea Lord (1946–48); East Indies Fleet (1944–45); 1st Battle Squadron (1943–44); Flag Officer, Malta (1943); 15th Cruiser Squadron (1942–43); HMS Ark Royal (1938)
- Conflicts: First World War; Second World War
- Awards: Knight Grand Cross of the Order of the Bath; Knight Grand Cross of the Order of the British Empire; Commander of the Royal Victorian Order; Knight of Justice of the Order of St John; Mentioned in Despatches (4); Commander's Cross of the Order of Polonia Restituta (Poland); Commander of the Legion of Merit (United States); Grand Cross of the Order of Orange Nassau (Netherlands)
- Other work: First and Principal Naval Aide-de-camp to George VI (1951–52) and Elizabeth II (1952); Deputy Lieutenant, Southampton

Admiral of the Fleet Sir Arthur John Power GCB, GBE, CVO (12 April 1889 – 28 January 1960) was a Royal Navy officer. He took part in the First World War as a gunnery officer and saw action in the Dardanelles campaign. During the inter-war years he commanded the gunnery school at HMS Excellent and then the aircraft carrier HMS Ark Royal. During the Second World War he played a leading role in the planning for the Allied invasion of Sicily and for the Allied invasion of Italy and then commanded the naval forces for the actual landing of V Corps at Taranto in Italy in September 1943. He went on to be Commander-in-Chief of the East Indies Fleet in the closing stages of the war and conducted naval strikes on the Imperial Japanese Army in Borneo and Malaya. After the War he became Second Sea Lord and Chief of Naval Personnel, Commander-in-Chief, Mediterranean Fleet and then Commander-in-Chief, Portsmouth.

== Naval career ==
=== Early career ===
Born the son of Edward John Power and Harriet Maud Power (née Windeler), Power joined the training ship HMS Britannia as a cadet in 1904 and, having won the King's medal as best cadet of his year, he was promoted to midshipman on 15 September 1905. He was promoted to acting sub-lieutenant on 15 January 1909 and to lieutenant on 15 April 1910 on his appointment to the battlecruiser HMS Indomitable in the Home Fleet. He became First Lieutenant in the destroyer HMS Nautilus in October 1912 and then attended HMS Excellent, the gunnery school at Portsmouth, in 1913.

Power served as a gunnery officer throughout the First World War, initially in the battleship HMS Magnificent, then in the cruiser HMS Royal Arthur and next in the monitor HMS Raglan. In the Raglan he saw action in the Dardanelles campaign, before transferring to the battlecruiser HMS Princess Royal in the Grand Fleet. He was promoted to lieutenant commander on 15 April 1918.

After the war Power joined the directing staff at HMS Excellent. Promoted to commander on 31 December 1922, he became an assistant to the Director in the Naval Ordnance Department at the Admiralty in January 1923 and, after attending the Royal Naval Staff College, he became Executive Officer on HMS Hood, flagship of the battlecruiser squadron in the Atlantic Fleet in 1925. He joined the directing staff at the Royal Naval Staff College in 1927 and, having been promoted to captain on 30 July 1929, he joined the Ordnance Committee at the Royal Arsenal. He became Flag Captain of the Second Cruiser Squadron in the Home Fleet in the cruiser HMS Dorsetshire in April 1931 and, having served on the directing staff at the Imperial Defence College in 1933, he became commanding officer of the gunnery school HMS Excellent in October 1935. He was appointed a Commander of the Royal Victorian Order on 29 January 1936. He went on to be commanding officer of the aircraft carrier HMS Ark Royal in September 1937, and in that capacity, also became Flag Captain to the Flag Officer commanding aircraft carriers in the Home Fleet in July 1939.

=== Second World War ===
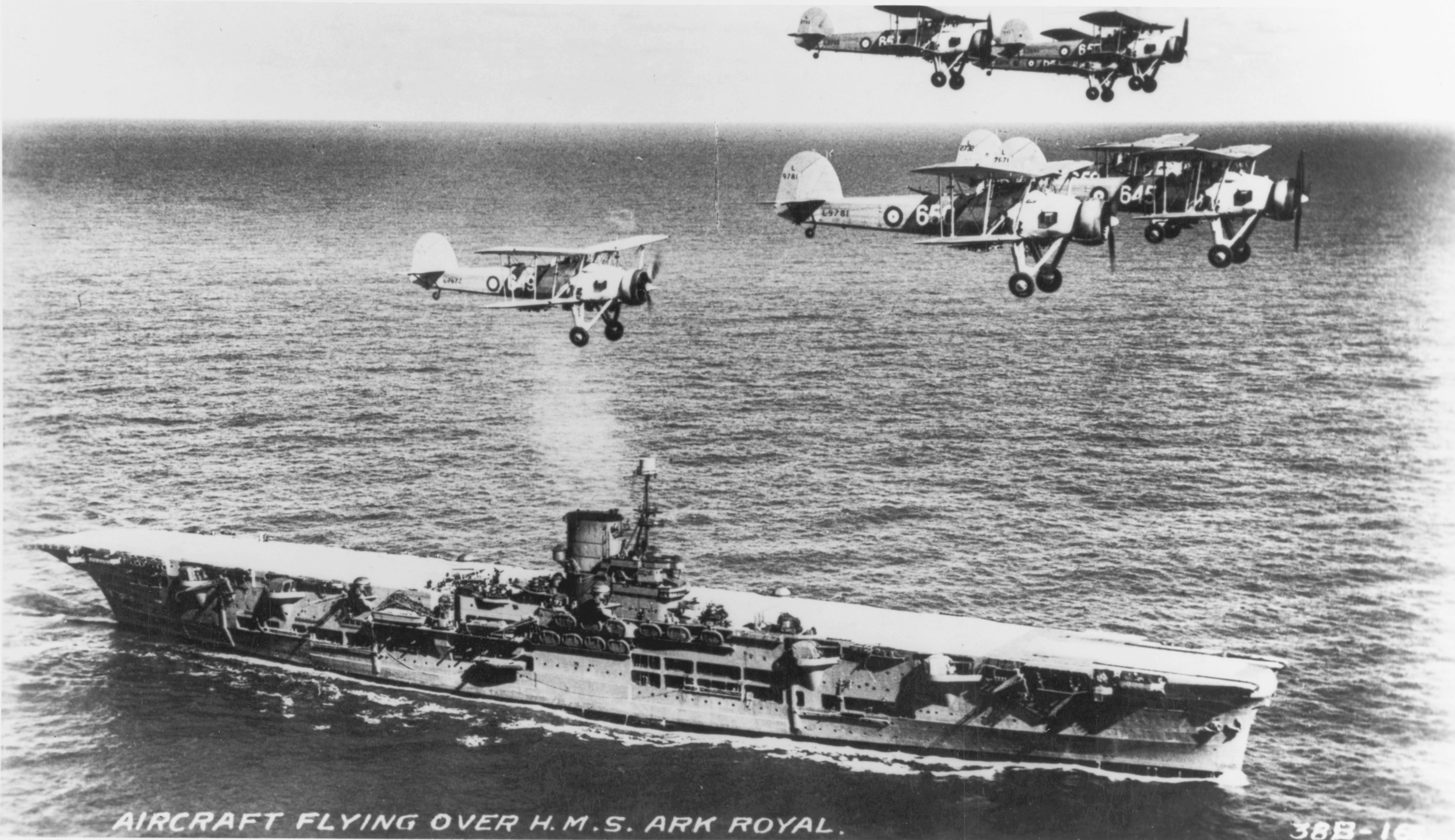
Power commanded Ark Royal in the early months of the Second World War

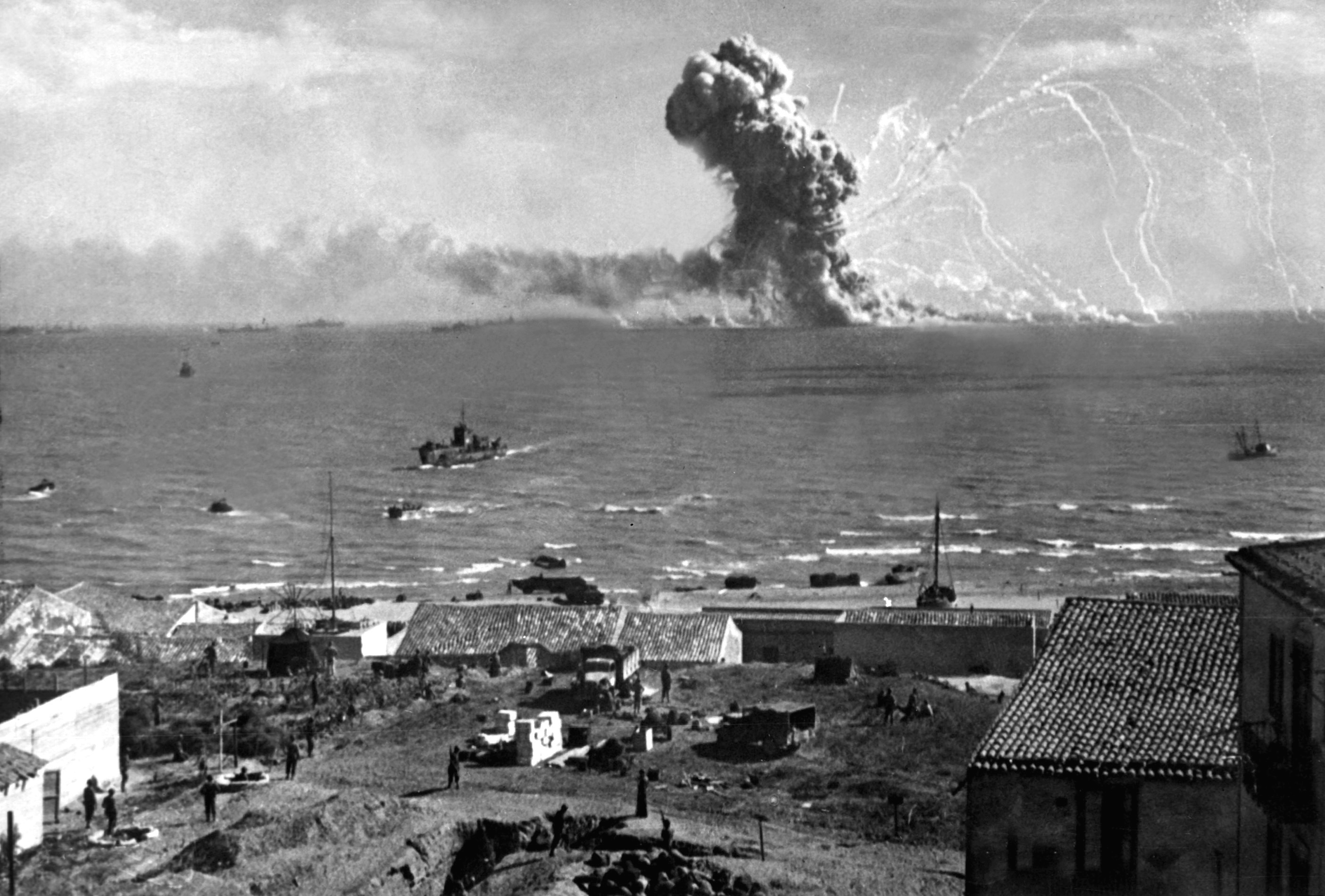
The Allied invasion of Sicily, for which Power conducted the planning

Power served in the Second World War as assistant chief of the Naval Staff from May 1940 and was granted promotion to rear admiral on 25 June 1940. Appointed a Companion of the Order of the Bath on 1 July 1941, he became commander of the 15th Cruiser Squadron in the Mediterranean Fleet with his flag in the cruiser HMS Cleopatra in August 1942.

Appointed Flag Officer in charge of Malta in May 1943, he played a leading role in the planning for the Allied invasion of Sicily in July 1943, and, having been promoted to vice admiral on 4 August 1943, he led the planning for the Allied invasion of Italy and then commanded the naval forces for the actual landing of V Corps at Taranto in September 1943. Following the landings, he became head of the Allied military mission to the Italian government and was briefly Commander of the 1st Battle Squadron and second in command of the Mediterranean Fleet.

Advanced to Knight Commander of the Order of the Bath on 1 January 1944, Power became commander of the 1st Battle Squadron and second in command of the Eastern Fleet with his flag in the battlecruiser HMS Renown in January 1944. He went on to be commander-in-chief of that fleet, renamed the East Indies Fleet, in November 1944, and conducted naval strikes on the Imperial Japanese Army in Borneo and Malaya. Flying his flag in Cleopatra, the first British ship to enter Singapore since its fall in the Battle of Singapore over three years earlier, Power arrived in style to attend the final surrender of the Japanese there in September 1945.

=== Later career ===
Power was appointed a Knight Grand Cross of the Order of the British Empire on 1 January 1946 and became Second Sea Lord and Chief of Naval Personnel in February 1946. Promoted to full admiral on 6 May 1946, he proceeded to manage the run-down in naval manpower after the War. He went on to be Commander-in-Chief, Mediterranean Fleet in May 1948 and, having been advanced to Knight Grand Cross of the Order of the Bath on 2 January 1950, he became Commander-in-Chief, Portsmouth in September 1950. He was also appointed First and Principal Naval Aide-de-Camp to the King on 15 January 1951 and was double-hatted as NATO Allied Commander-in-Chief, Channel and Southern North Sea Command from 1952. He attended the funeral of King George VI in February 1952 and was promoted to Admiral of the Fleet on 22 April 1952.

Power retired in September 1952 and became a Deputy Lieutenant of Southampton on 27 April 1953 shortly before attending the coronation of Queen Elizabeth II in June 1953. He died at the Royal Naval Hospital, Haslar on 28 January 1960.

== Family ==
In 1918 Power married Amy Bingham; they had three sons (including Vice Admiral Sir Arthur Mackenzie Power). Following the death of his first wife in 1945, he married Margaret Joyce Watson in 1947.

== Legacy ==
The Power Papers are housed at the British Library. The papers can be accessed through the British Library catalogue.

== Sources ==
- Heathcote, Tony (2002). The British Admirals of the Fleet 1734–1995. Pen & Sword Ltd. ISBN 0-85052-835-6.

Military offices
Preceded by Sir Stuart Bonham Carter	Flag Officer, Malta; May–October 1943	Succeeded by Sir Louis Hamilton
Preceded by Sir Geoffrey Layton	Commander-in-Chief, East Indies Station; 1945–1946	Succeeded by Sir Clement Moody
Preceded by Sir Algernon Willis	Second Sea Lord; 1946–1948	Succeeded by Sir Cecil Harcourt
Preceded by Sir Algernon Willis	Commander-in-Chief, Mediterranean Fleet; 1948–1950	Succeeded by Sir John Edelsten
Preceded by Sir Algernon Willis	Commander-in-Chief, Portsmouth; 1950–1952	Succeeded by Sir John Edelsten
Honorary titles
Preceded by Sir Henry Moore	First and Principal Naval Aide-de-Camp; 1949–1952	Succeeded by Sir Rhoderick McGrigor
