= Ralph Edwards (Royal Navy officer) =

Royal Navy Admiral (1901–1963)

Admiral Sir Ralph Edwards KCB CBE
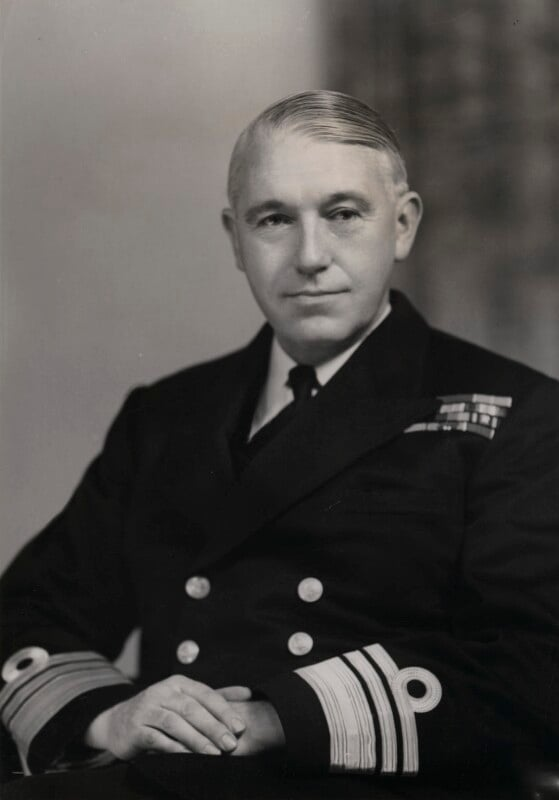
- Edwards in 1953
- Born: 31 March 1901
- Died: 4 February 1963 (aged 61)
- Military career
- Allegiance: United Kingdom
- Branch: Royal Navy
- Service years: 1914–1958
- Rank: Admiral
- Commands: HMNZS Gambia; HMS Illustrious; Mediterranean Fleet
- Conflicts: World War I; World War II
- Awards: Knight Commander of the Order of the Bath; Commander of the Order of the British Empire

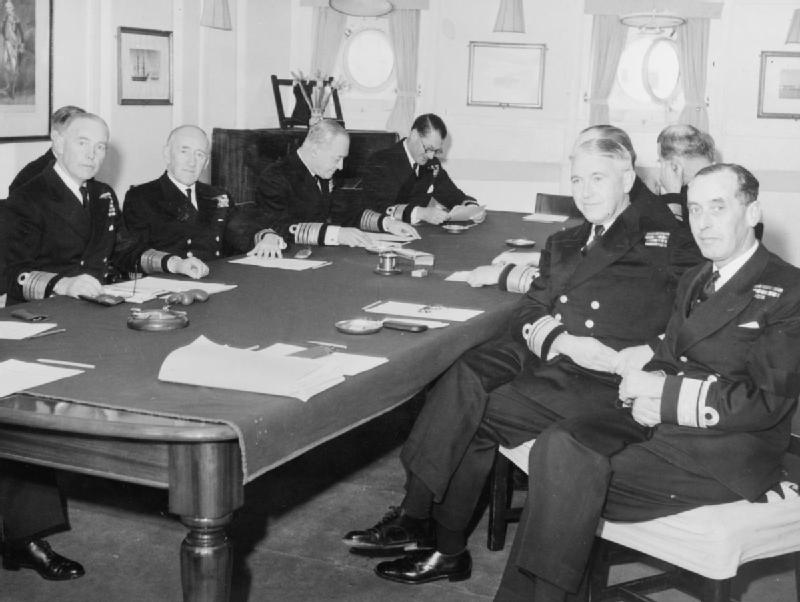
Rear Admiral Edwards, second from right, at a conference with First Sea Lord Admiral Sir Rhoderick McGrigor and other admirals aboard HMS Liverpool, 1952

Admiral Sir Ralph Alan Bevan Edwards KCB CBE (31 March 1901 – 4 February 1963) was a Royal Navy officer who served as Commander-in-Chief, Mediterranean Fleet.

== Naval career ==
Edwards joined the Royal Navy in 1914 and served in the battlecruiser HMS Tiger in the Grand Fleet during World War I.

In World War II, he served as Deputy Director and then as Director of the Operations Division for the Home Fleet. During this time, he oversaw the operation to sink the German battleship Bismarck. He then became Chief of Staff for the Eastern Fleet and, from March 1945, was Captain of HMNZS Gambia.

After the war he was made Captain of the aircraft carrier HMS Illustrious. He became Assistant Chief of Naval Staff in 1948. In July, 1951, he returned to sea in command of the First Cruiser Squadron and as Flag Officer (Air), Mediterranean, hoisting his flag in his old ship the Gambia. From November 1951, he was also Flag Officer, Second in Command of the Mediterranean Fleet. He then became Third Sea Lord and Controller of the Navy in 1953. His last appointment was as Commander-in-Chief, Mediterranean Fleet and NATO Commander Allied Forces Mediterranean in 1957. He retired in 1958.

== Family ==
In 1932 he married Joan Le Fowne Hurt; they had one son and one daughter.

Military offices
Preceded by Sir Michael Denny	Third Sea Lord and Controller of the Navy; 1953–1956	Succeeded by Sir Peter Reid
Preceded by Sir Guy Grantham	Commander-in-Chief, Mediterranean Fleet; 1957–1958	Succeeded by Sir Charles Lambe
