= Bernard Rawlings (Royal Navy officer) =

British admiral (1889–1962)

Admiral Sir Bernard Rawlings GBE KCB
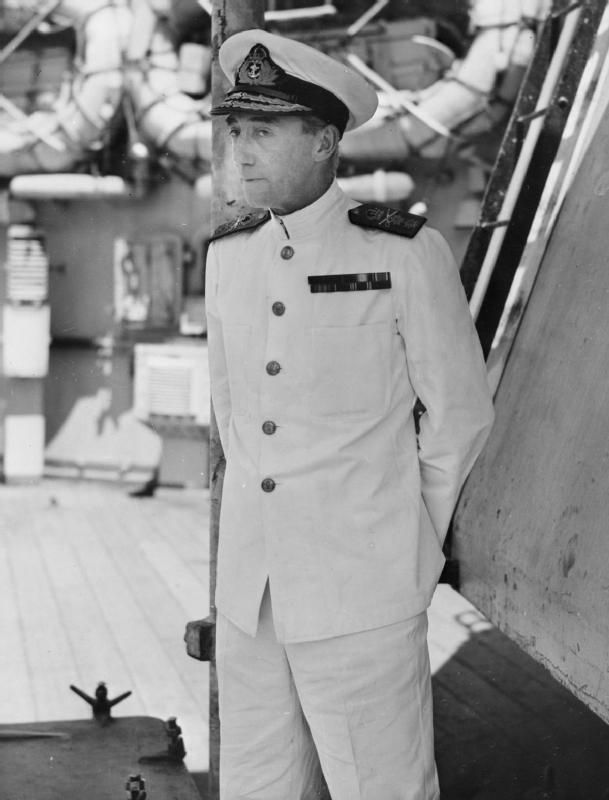
- Vice-Admiral Rawlings during the Second World War
- Born: 21 May 1889; St Erth, Cornwall, England
- Died: 30 September 1962 (aged 73); Bodmin, Cornwall, England
- Military career
- Allegiance: United Kingdom
- Branch: Royal Navy
- Service years: 1904–1946
- Rank: Admiral
- Commands: Eastern Mediterranean (1943–44); West Africa Station (1943); Force B (1941); 7th Cruiser Squadron (1941); 1st Battle Squadron (1940–41, 1944–45); HMS Valiant (1939–40); HMS Delhi (1932–34); HMS Curacoa (1932); HMS Active (1931–32)
- Conflicts: First World War; Second World War; Volcano and Ryukyu Islands campaign
- Awards: Knight Grand Cross of the Order of the British Empire; Knight Commander of the Order of the Bath; Mentioned in dispatches (2); Legion of Merit (United States); Order of George I (Greece); War Cross (Greece)

Admiral Sir Henry Bernard Hughes Rawlings GBE KCB (21 May 1889 – 30 September 1962) was a senior Royal Navy officer who served in both world wars. During the Second World War he commanded the battleship HMS Valiant, held senior staff and flag appointments, and served as Flag Officer, Eastern Mediterranean. He later became second-in-command of the British Pacific Fleet and commanded the British carrier force, Task Force 57, during operations against Japan in 1945, including the Okinawa campaign.

== Early life and naval career ==
Rawlings was born at St Erth, Cornwall, England, on 21 May 1889. He was educated at Stubbington House School and joined the Royal Navy in 1904. He served during the First World War and, after the war, was employed on Foreign Office work and undertook military missions in Poland.

During the inter-war period Rawlings held a succession of sea commands. He commanded the destroyer HMS Active and later the cruisers HMS Curacoa and HMS Delhi. In 1936 he was appointed Naval Attaché in Tokyo, a post he held until 1939.

== Second World War ==
At the beginning of the Second World War Rawlings commanded the battleship HMS Valiant. He then commanded the 1st Battle Squadron from 1940 with the acting rank of rear-admiral, before being promoted to that rank in January 1942. In 1941 he was appointed to command the 7th Cruiser Squadron and served in the Mediterranean during the naval campaigns around Greece and Crete.

During the evacuation of Crete in May 1941, Rawlings flew his flag in the light cruiser HMS Orion, which acted as flagship during the withdrawal of Commonwealth troops from Heraklion. The operation was delayed by embarkation difficulties and by the loss of the destroyer HMS Imperial, leaving the force exposed to German air attack in daylight as it passed south through the Kaso Strait. Orion was repeatedly attacked by German dive-bombers and suffered catastrophic damage. Her captain, G. R. B. Back, was mortally wounded, her bridge and forward armament were wrecked and a bomb explosion in the forward part of the ship caused many casualties among the crew and the troops embarked for evacuation. Despite the damage to her steering, communications and machinery, Orion reached Alexandria on the evening of 29 May 1941.

Rawlings's Mediterranean service formed part of the Royal Navy's wider effort to maintain sea control and support Allied operations east of Malta and west of Suez. The campaigns in Greece, Crete, North Africa and the eastern Mediterranean required repeated evacuation, supply, bombardment and convoy operations, often under heavy air attack. Cruisers such as HMS Orion, HMS Ajax and HMS Gloucester played a prominent role in these operations.

Rawlings became Assistant Chief of the Naval Staff in April 1942. In that role he was part of the senior naval establishment at a time of increasing Anglo-American naval cooperation. A 1942 illustrated report in The Sphere showed Rawlings among senior British and American naval officers at the Admiralty during a visit by Admiral Harold Stark.

In March 1943 Rawlings was appointed Flag Officer, West Africa, with the acting rank of vice-admiral, and was promoted to substantive vice-admiral in November 1943. In December 1943 he became Flag Officer, Eastern Mediterranean, a major operational command during the later stages of the war in that theatre.

== British Pacific Fleet ==
Rawlings later served as second-in-command of the British Pacific Fleet, under Admiral Sir Bruce Fraser, with his flag in the battleship HMS King George V. The fleet was formed to bring a substantial British naval force into the final Allied offensive against Japan. Its deployment required extensive logistical preparation, since the Royal Navy had to operate thousands of miles from its traditional bases and alongside the much larger United States Pacific Fleet.

The British Pacific Fleet was intended to operate as a balanced fleet rather than simply as a collection of individual ships. It included aircraft carriers, battleships, cruisers, destroyers and a fleet train capable of supplying fuel, ammunition, stores and repair support at great distance. This logistical organisation was essential because the fleet would be operating far from Britain, the Mediterranean and the main imperial naval bases.

In 1945 Rawlings commanded the British carrier force in the Pacific, called Task Force 57. The force included the fleet carriers Illustrious, Indomitable, Indefatigable and Victorious, with battleships, cruisers, destroyers and support vessels. During Operation Iceberg, the invasion of Okinawa, Rawlings's force attacked Japanese airfields in the Sakishima Islands and Formosa to reduce the threat of kamikaze attacks against Allied forces off Okinawa.

Task Force 57 operated under demanding conditions. Its carriers were attacked by Japanese aircraft, and several were damaged, but the armoured flight decks of British carriers enabled them to resume operations comparatively quickly. The force also faced the challenge of replenishment at sea, a major concern for a fleet operating at great distance from established British bases. Despite these constraints, Rawlings's command remained in action through much of the Okinawa campaign and demonstrated that the Royal Navy could conduct long carrier operations in the Pacific theatre.

The British Pacific Fleet's operations also revealed difficulties in aircraft recognition and coordination when operating close to United States forces. In his operational report, Rawlings noted the increasing importance of distinguishing between friendly and enemy aircraft during fleet operations. A 1948 report on the British Pacific Fleet stated that fifteen British aircraft had been shot down through mistaken identification during the Okinawa campaign.

After the Okinawa operations, Rawlings continued to serve with the British Pacific Fleet as Allied forces prepared for further operations against the Japanese home islands. The war ended before those operations were carried out. Rawlings retired from the Royal Navy in 1946 with the rank of admiral.

== Later life and death ==
Rawlings died at Bodmin, Cornwall, England, on 30 September 1962, aged 73.

== Honours ==
Rawlings was appointed Knight Commander of the Order of the Bath and Knight Grand Cross of the Order of the British Empire. He was also awarded the United States Legion of Merit for his wartime service.

== Legacy ==
Rawlings's reputation rests largely on his senior commands during the Second World War, particularly his Mediterranean service and his command of Task Force 57 in the Pacific. As second-in-command of the British Pacific Fleet, he played an important role in the Royal Navy's return to big operations in the Pacific and in demonstrating the value of British carrier forces during the final phase of the war against Japan.

Military offices
Preceded by Sir Algernon Willis	Flag Officer, Eastern Mediterranean (formerly Commander-in-Chief, Levant); 1943–1944	Post disbanded
