= Peter Reid (Royal Navy officer) =

Royal Navy Admiral (1903–1973)

Admiral Sir Peter Reid GCB CVO
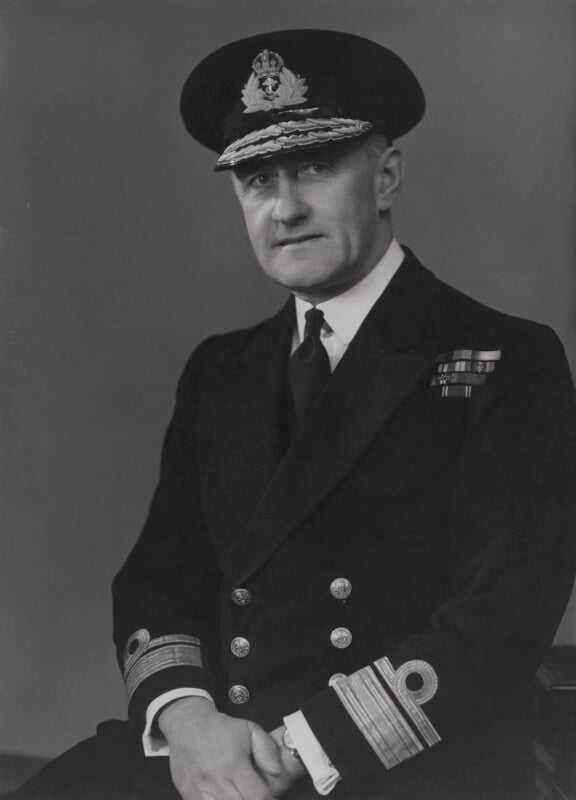
- Reid in 1953
- Born: John Peter Lorne Reid; 10 January 1903; London, England
- Died: 26 September 1973 (aged 70); Haddington, East Lothian, Scotland
- Military career
- Allegiance: United Kingdom
- Branch: Royal Navy
- Service years: 1916 – 1961
- Rank: Admiral
- Commands: HMS Dido; HMS Cleopatra
- Conflicts: World War II
- Awards: Knight Grand Cross of the Order of the Bath; Commander of the Royal Victorian Order

Admiral Sir John Peter Lorne Reid GCB CVO (10 January 1903 – 26 September 1973) was a Royal Navy officer who went on to be Controller of the Navy.

== Naval career ==
Reid was born in London on 10 January 1903, the son of Sir James Reid, 1st Baronet (1849–1923) and his wife Honourable Susan Baring (1870–1961), daughter of the banker Edward Baring, 1st Baron Revelstoke.

He joined the Royal Navy as a cadet in 1916. He served in World War II in operations off Norway and then off Algeria before taking part in the Battle of Cape Matapan in 1941. He was Chief Signal Officer to Field Marshal Lord Wavell during defence of the East Indies in 1941 and then served on the staff of Sir James Somerville, Commander-in-Chief, Eastern Fleet, in 1942 before becoming deputy director of the Signals Division in 1943.

After the War he commanded HMS Dido and then HMS Cleopatra. He was appointed Chief of Staff to the Commander-in-Chief, Portsmouth in 1951 and Second in Command of the Mediterranean Fleet in 1954. His last appointment was as Controller of the Navy in 1956 before he retired in 1961.

He lived in Bolton in East Lothian and in retirement was a Member of the Livingston New Town Corporation.

He was appointed a Commander of the Royal Victorian Order on 16 July 1953 and a Knight Commander of the Order of the Bath in the 1957 New Year Honours. He was advanced to Knight Grand Cross of the Order of the Bath in the 1961 Birthday Honours.

== Family ==
In 1933 he married Jean Dundas (1909–1971); they had one son and one daughter.

Military offices
Preceded by Sir Ralph Edwards	Third Sea Lord and Controller of the Navy; 1956–1961	Succeeded by Sir Michael Le Fanu
Honorary titles
Preceded by Sir John Edelsten	Rear-Admiral of the United Kingdom; 1962–1966	Succeeded by Sir Alexander Bingley
Preceded by Sir John Edelsten	Vice-Admiral of the United Kingdom; 1966–1973	Succeeded by Sir Deric Holland-Martin
