= Allied Forces Mediterranean =

- Active: 1952–1967
- Allegiance: (NATO) North Atlantic Treaty Organization
- Part of: Allied Command Europe, Casteau, Belgium
- Location: Malta

Allied Forces Mediterranean was a NATO command covering all military operations in the Mediterranean Sea from 1952 to 1967. The command was based at Malta.

== History ==
The British post of Commander in Chief Mediterranean Fleet was given a dual-hatted role as NATO Commander in Chief of Allied Forces Mediterranean (CINCAFMED) in charge of all forces assigned to NATO in the Mediterranean Area. The British made strong representations within NATO in discussions regarding the development of the Mediterranean NATO command structure, wishing to retain their direction of NATO naval command in the Mediterranean to protect their sea lines of communication running through the Mediterranean to the Middle East and Far East.

Subordinate commands were under discussion in 1954 and 1956. Finally decided were:

- Gibraltar Mediterranean Command (GIBMED) with headquarters at Gibraltar (Rear-Admiral R.A. Foster-Brown, Flag Officer Gibraltar)
- Western Mediterranean Area (Méditerranée Occidentale) (MEDOC) with headquarters at Algiers (French) under French Admiral Philip M.J. Auboyneau (COMEDOC) (who took over from Vice-Admiral A.P. Sala 1 August 1955)
- Central Mediterranean Area (MEDCENT) with headquarters at Naples (Italian) first under Italian Vice-Admiral M.Girosi, and now under Vice-Admiral C. Lubranodi Negozio (COMEDCENT)(1 March 55)
- Eastern Mediterranean Area (MEDEAST) (Aegan and Eastern Ionian Seas) with headquarters at Athens. (Greek Vice-Admiral P.Lappas)
- Northeast Mediterranean Area (MEDNOREAST) with HQ at Ankara (Admiral S. Altincan)
- Southeast Med Area with HQ at Malta (MEDSOUEAST), with personnel drawn from HQ AFMED. (Second-in-Command, Mediterranean Fleet, Vice Admiral Maxwell Richmond (18 August 1955))

It was estimated however, that the expense involved in discharging the international functions of any one of these "headquarters will be small and that the cost of introducing and administering international financing would be relatively high and uneconomical. Furthermore, at these command levels, national and NATO planning are closely associated and intermixed. Therefore [t]he Standing Group, with the concurrence of the Military Representatives Committee, has therefore agreed that these Allied Area Headquarters subordinate to CINCAFMED should be supported by the nation which supports the larger national headquarters within which the international headquarters will be located. This financial arrangement should be without prejudice to decisions as to future financing if these Allied Area Headquarters are significantly expanded."

In 1967, the UK relinquished the NATO post of Commander in Chief Allied Forces Mediterranean, which was disbanded.

== Commanders ==
Commanders included:

- Admiral Sir John Edelsten (1952)
- Admiral Earl Mountbatten of Burma (1952–1954)
- Admiral Sir Guy Grantham (1954–1957)
- Vice Admiral Sir Ralph Edwards (1957–1958)
- Admiral Sir Charles Lambe (1958–1959)
- Admiral Sir Alexander Bingley (1959–1961)
- Admiral Sir Deric Holland-Martin (1961–1964)
- Admiral Sir John Hamilton (1964–1967)

== Sources ==
- David Miller, The Cold War: A Military History (note that Miller says the three functional commands (SUBMED, SUBNOREASTMED, and USPATMED) were actually activated, while period documents make clear that at least initially they were approved in principle for wartime use, but not actually established)
