= John Edelsten =

Admiral Sir John Edelsten GCB GCVO CBE
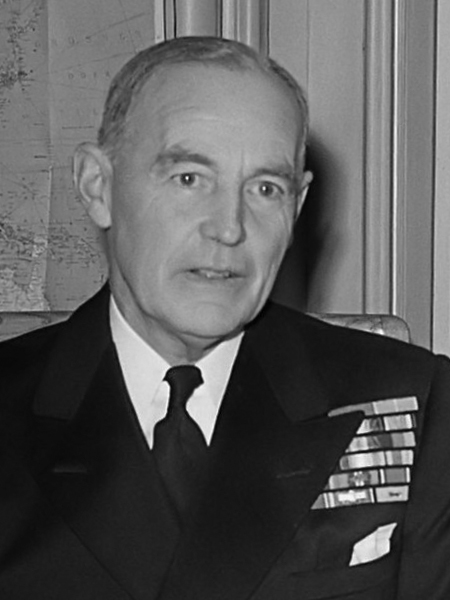
- John Edelsten (1953)
- Born: 12 May 1891; Enfield, Middlesex, England
- Died: 10 February 1966; Liphook, Hampshire
- Military career
- Allegiance: United Kingdom
- Branch: Royal Navy
- Rank: Admiral
- Commands: 1st Battle Squadron; 4th Cruiser Squadron; Mediterranean Fleet; Portsmouth Command
- Conflicts: World War II
- Awards: Knight Grand Cross of the Order of the Bath; Knight Grand Cross of the Royal Victorian Order; Commander of the Order of the British Empire

Admiral Sir John Hereward Edelsten GCB GCVO CBE (12 May 1891 – 10 February 1966) was a senior Royal Navy officer who went on to be Commander-in-Chief, Portsmouth.

== Early life ==
Edelsten was born 12 May 1891 in Enfield, Middlesex, England the third son to John Jackson Edelsten and Jessica Gooding. John Jackson Edelsten owned a tea broker business.

== Naval career ==
Edelsten joined the Royal Navy in 1908. He served in World War I and then became Deputy Director of Plans in 1938.

He also served in World War II initially as Senior Naval Officer during operations against Italian Somaliland before becoming chief of staff to the Commander-in-Chief, Mediterranean Station in 1941. He was made Assistant Chief of the Naval Staff (U-boat Warfare and Trade) in 1942 and Rear Admiral (Destroyers) for the British Pacific Fleet in 1945.

After the War he commanded 1st Battle Squadron and then 4th Cruiser Squadron before becoming Vice Chief of the Naval Staff in 1947. He was made Commander-in-Chief, Mediterranean Fleet in 1950; this post was dual hatted from 1952 as NATO Commander Allied Forces Mediterranean.

In this capacity he conducted a two-day visit to Israel. His last post was as Commander-in-Chief, Portsmouth and NATO Allied Naval Commander-in-Chief, Channel Command in 1952; he retired in 1954.

He was also First and Principal Naval Aide-de-Camp to the Queen from 1953 to 1954.

Edelsten was appointed a Knight Grand Cross of the Royal Victorian Order in the 1953 Coronation Honours.

== Family ==
On 14 December 1926, Edelsten married Frances Anne Hoile Masefield at the Holy Trinity Church in London. Frances was born 14 October 1900 in Broughty Ferry, Forfarshire, Scotland to Henry Valentine Masefield and Caroline Gordon.

Military offices
Preceded by Sir Rhoderick McGrigor	Vice Chief of the Naval Staff; 1947–1949	Succeeded by Sir George Creasy
Preceded by Sir Arthur Power	Commander-in-Chief, Mediterranean Fleet; 1950–1952	Succeeded by Lord Mountbatten
Preceded by Sir Arthur Power	Commander-in-Chief, Portsmouth; 1952–1955	Succeeded by Sir George Creasy
Honorary titles
Preceded by Sir Rhoderick McGrigor	First and Principal Naval Aide-de-Camp; 1953–1954	Succeeded by Sir Guy Russell
Preceded by Sir Percy Noble	Rear-Admiral of the United Kingdom; 1955–1962	Succeeded by Sir Peter Reid
Preceded by Sir Martin Dunbar-Nasmith	Vice-Admiral of the United Kingdom; 1962–1966	Succeeded by Sir Peter Reid
