= Operation MB 8 =

- Part of the Battle of the Mediterranean of the Second World War
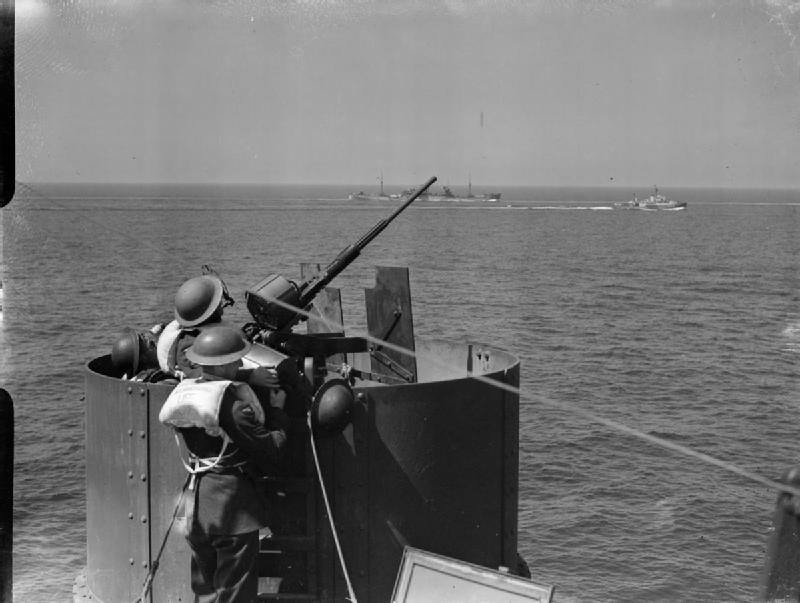
- 20 mm Oerlikon gunners on board a merchant ship on a Malta bound convoy
| Date | 4–11 November 1940 |
| Location | Western part of the Mediterranean Sea 35°N 18°E |
| Result | British victory |

Belligerents
| United Kingdom | Italy |

Commanders and leaders
| Andrew Cunningham; Lumley Lyster | Inigo Campioni |

Units involved
| Mediterranean Fleet; Force H | Regia Marina; Regia Aeronautica |

Strength
| 2 aircraft carriers; 5 battleships; 10 cruisers; 30 destroyers | |

Operation MB 8 was a British Royal Navy operation in the Mediterranean Sea from 4 to 11 November 1940. It was made up of six forces comprising two aircraft carriers, five battleships, 10 cruisers and 30 destroyers, including much of Force H from Gibraltar, protecting four supply convoys. It consisted of Operation Coat, Operation Crack, Convoy MW 3, Convoy ME 3, Convoy AN 6 and the main element Operation Judgement (the Battle of Taranto).

== Operation Coat ==
Operation Coat was a reinforcement convoy from Britain to Malta, carrying troops and anti-aircraft guns. The convoy was made up of the battleship HMS Barham, heavy cruisers HMS Berwick and Glasgow and three escorting destroyers. It was covered by the aircraft carrier HMS Ark Royal, light cruiser HMS Sheffield and three more destroyers, all from Force H, out to mid-Mediterranean; three Force H destroyers would remain, the rest turning back 165 nmi (190 mi; 306 km) from Sicily.

=== Operation Crack ===
Operation Crack was an attack on Cagliari by aircraft from Ark Royal, en route to Malta, branching off from Operation Coat.

== Convoy MW 3 ==
Convoy MW 3 was made up of three empty merchantmen from Malta with an Australian destroyer and the monitor HMS Terror bound for the base at Suda Bay in Crete thence to Alexandria. The convoy was escorted by the anti-aircraft cruiser HMS Coventry, accompanied by three destroyers. The 11.5 kn (13.2 mph; 21.3 km/h) convoy left Alexandria on 4 November and reached Malta on 10 November.

== Convoy ME 3 ==
Convoy ME 3 comprised four merchantmen sailing in ballast from Malta to Alexandria, under escort of the battleship HMS Ramillies, Coventry, and two destroyers. The convoy sailed from Malta on 10 November and arrived in Alexandria on 13 November.

== Convoy AN 6 ==
Convoy AN 6 consisted of four slow tankers bound for Greece from Egypt, in support of the British expeditionary force there, escorted by a slow trawler. Shaping a similar course were reinforcements for Crete, embarked in the light cruisers HMS Ajax and HMAS Sydney as Force B, while Force C, the light cruiser HMS Orion (Vice Admiral Henry Pridham-Wippell) transported RAF supplies to Greece and inspected Suda Bay. All three would rejoin to form Force X for an 11/12 November raid on the Otranto Strait.

== Operation Judgement ==
Operation Judgement, under the command of Admiral Andrew Cunningham, was executed by aircraft from the carrier HMS Illustrious, escorted by the battleships Ramillies, Warspite, Valiant and Malaya. They met the heavy cruiser York, the light cruiser Gloucester and three destroyers, then escorting Convoy MW 3 and provided cover. A rendezvous with the Barham group from Operation Coat was to be made, with Illustrious, Gloucester, York and Berwick detaching to attack Taranto, coincident with the Force X raid. The Italians were aware of sorties from Alexandria and Gibraltar by 7 November and sent nine submarines to attack the Malta-bound Convoy MW 3 detected on 8 November. Bombers failed to pinpoint the Judgement force and when Force H was detected heading back toward Gibraltar on 9 November, the Italians assumed that Convoy MW 3 had turned around, too.

Italian confusion arose when Barham, Berwick, Glasgow and their destroyers were detected 10 November off Lemnos. The correct deduction, that they had detached from the Gibraltar-bound force, was not accompanied by a correct guess they would join with Cunningham. The same day, Ramillies, Coventry and two destroyers protecting Convoy ME 3 were detected and again, bombers failed to locate them. The complexity of Operation MB8, with its forces and convoys, deceived the Italians into thinking that only normal convoying was underway. While Italian reconnaissance was characteristically bad, in the end, the Italians had only failed to keep track of Illustrious. That the Italians expected the British to behave in what was usual was the cause of the mistake.

== See also ==
- Battle of the Mediterranean
- Malta Convoys
- Force H
