= Algernon Willis =

Royal Navy Admiral of the Fleet (1889–1976)

Admiral of the Fleet Sir Algernon Willis GCB KBE DSO KStJ
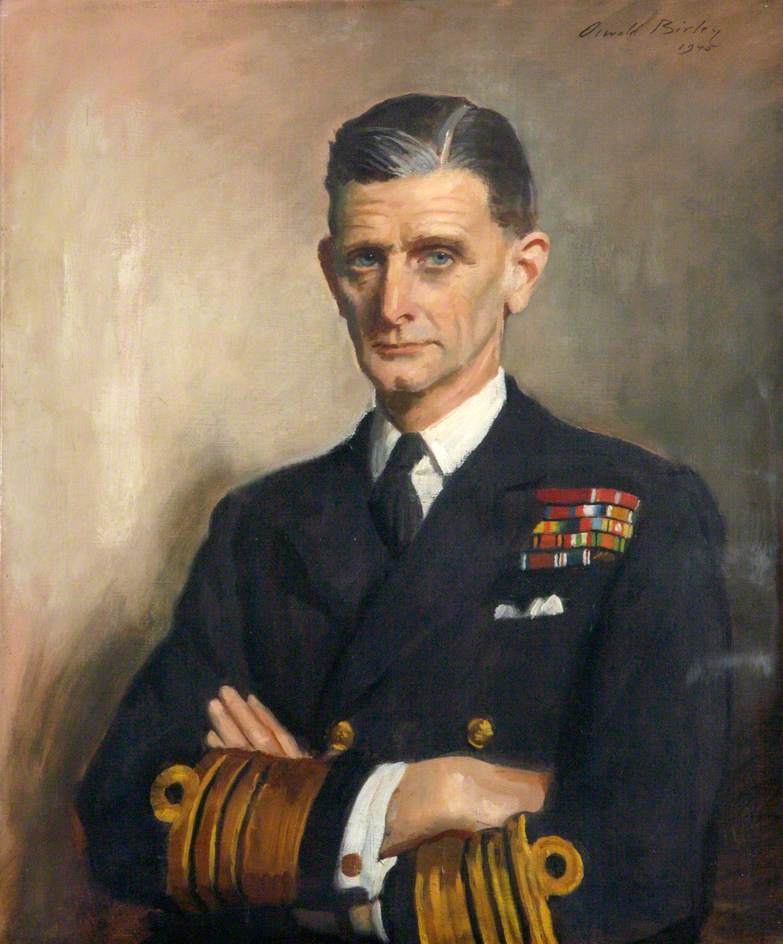
- Willis in 1945, by Oswald Birley
- Born: 17 May 1889; Hampstead, London
- Died: 12 April 1976 (aged 86); Royal Naval Hospital, Haslar
- Military career
- Allegiance: United Kingdom
- Branch: Royal Navy
- Service years: 1904–1950
- Rank: Admiral of the Fleet
- Commands: HMAS Vampire; HMS Kent; HMS Nelson; HMS Vernon; HMS Barham; South Atlantic Station; 3rd Battle Squadron; Force B Force H Levant; Mediterranean Fleet; Portsmouth Command
- Conflicts: World War I World War II
- Awards: Knight Grand Cross of the Order of the Bath; Knight Commander of the Order of the British Empire; Distinguished Service Order

Admiral of the Fleet Sir Algernon Usborne Willis GCB KBE DSO (17 May 1889 – 12 April 1976) was a Royal Navy officer. He served in the First World War and saw action at the Battle of Jutland in May 1916. He also served in the Second World War as Commander-in-Chief, South Atlantic in which capacity he led actions against German and Japanese raiding ships. He was Flag Officer commanding 3rd Battle Squadron and Second in command of the Eastern Fleet and then Flag Officer commanding Force H, which covered North African Operations, the Allied invasion of Sicily in July 1943 and then the Allied invasion of Italy in September 1943.

Willis spent the final years of the war as Commander-in-Chief, Levant, in which capacity he conducted naval operations in support of the Dodecanese Campaign, and then as Second Sea Lord, when he arranged the manpower for the campaign in the Pacific Ocean against the Imperial Japanese Navy. After the war he served as Commander-in-Chief, Mediterranean Fleet, in which role he was faced with unrest in Mandatory Palestine, before he became Commander-in-Chief, Portsmouth.

== Naval career ==
=== Early career ===
Born the son of Herbert Bourdillon Willis and Edith Florence Willis (née Moore), Willis was educated at Eastbourne College before joining the training ship HMS Britannia as a cadet in 1903 and being promoted to midshipman on 15 September 1905. He was first appointed to the battleship HMS Hindustan in the Channel Fleet before transferring to the battleship HMS Glory in the Mediterranean Fleet in September 1907. Promoted to sub-lieutenant on 15 November 1908 and to lieutenant on 15 November 1909, he joined the armoured cruiser HMS Donegal in the Home Fleet in May 1910. He then transferred to the armoured cruiser HMS Good Hope in the Mediterranean Fleet in 1911 and attended the torpedo school HMS Vernon in 1914.

Willis served in the First World War initially as torpedo officer in the battleship HMS Magnificent in the Grand Fleet before returning first to the torpedo school HMS Vernon in Spring 1915 and then to the armoured cruiser HMS Donegal, now in the Atlantic Fleet, later that year. He next spent a tour at the torpedo school HMS Defiance at Plymouth before transferring to the scout cruiser HMS Fearless in the Grand Fleet in which he saw action at the Battle of Jutland in May 1916. After that he returned to HMS Vernon, where he was promoted to lieutenant commander on 15 November 1917, before transferring to the destroyer HMS Saumarez in September 1918.

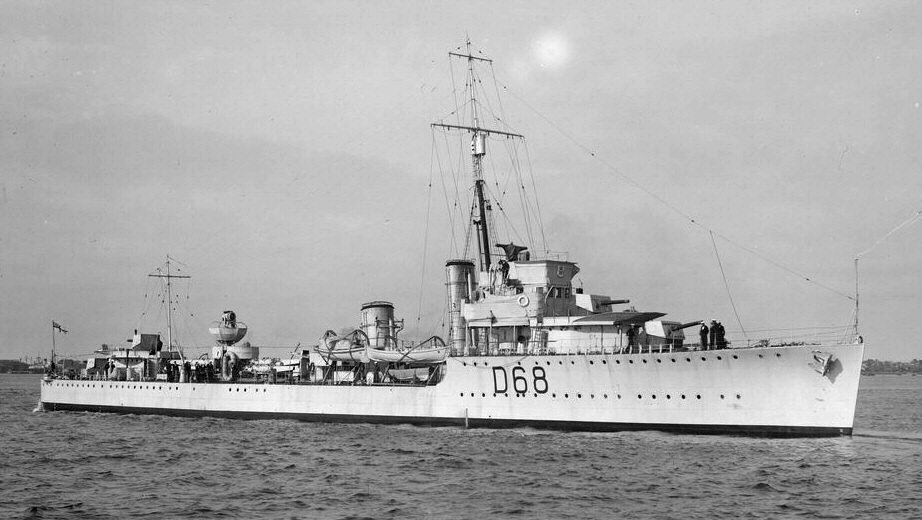
HMS Wallace, the first ship that Willis commanded

Willis transferred to the destroyer HMS Wallace in November 1918 and saw action against the Bolsheviks in the Baltic in early 1919, for which service he was awarded the Distinguished Service Order on 8 March 1920. He transferred to the battlecruiser HMS Renown later that year and took part in the visit by the Prince of Wales to Australia and New Zealand. He returned to HMS Vernon again in 1921 and, having been promoted to commander on 30 June 1922, attending the Royal Naval Staff College. He became torpedo officer in the cruiser HMS Coventry in the Atlantic Fleet in December 1923 and then returned to the destroyer HMS Wallace as commanding officer in October 1927.

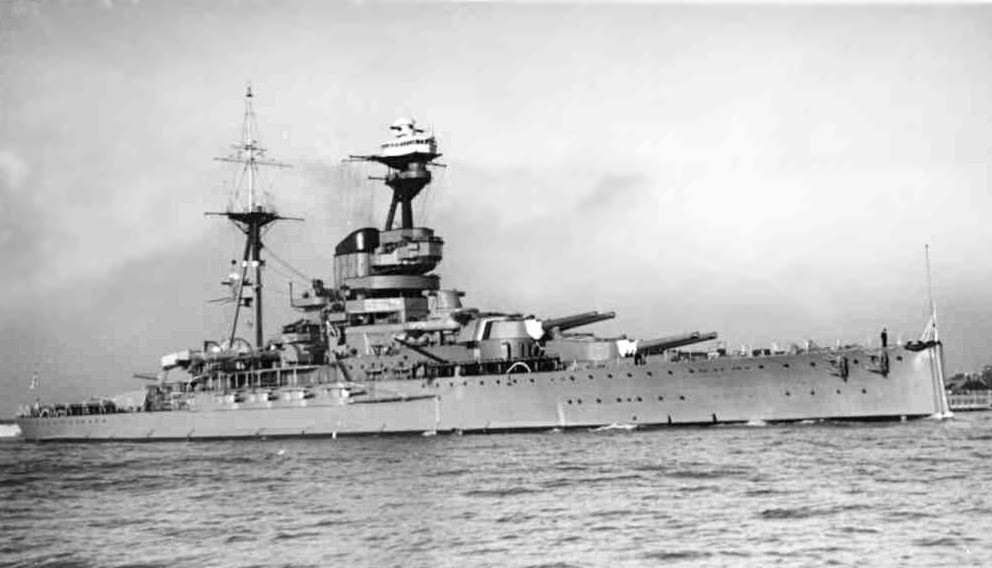
HMS Resolution, Willis's flagship as second-in-command of the Eastern Fleet

Promoted to captain on 30 June 1929, Willis joined the directing staff at the Royal Naval Staff College in February 1930. He went on to be Flag Captain to the Commander-in-Chief, China Station in the cruiser HMS Kent in January 1933 and Flag Captain to the Commander-in-Chief, Home Fleet in the battleship HMS Nelson in May 1934. After that he became captain of HMS Vernon in September 1935 and commanding officer of the battleship HMS Barham in the Mediterranean Fleet in April 1938. Promoted to commodore on 2 February 1939, he became Chief of Staff to the Commander-in-Chief, Mediterranean Fleet, from February 1939 under Sir Dudley Pound, and, from June 1939 under Sir Andrew Cunningham.

=== The Second World War ===
Willis served in the Second World War initially on Cunningham's staff in which capacity, after promotion to rear admiral on 5 January 1940, he was involved in planning operations against the Regia Marina (Italian Navy). Appointed a Companion of the Order of the Bath on 11 July 1940, he became Commander-in-Chief, South Atlantic with acting rank of vice-admiral in 1941, leading actions against German and Japanese raiding ships. He then became Flag Officer commanding 3rd Battle Squadron and Second in command of the Eastern Fleet under Sir James Somerville with his flag in the battleship HMS Resolution in February 1942. In February 1943 he became Flag Officer commanding Force H, the force which covered North African Operations, the Allied invasion of Sicily in July 1943 and then the Allied invasion of Italy in September 1943. Promoted to the substantive rank of vice admiral on 12 April 1943, he was advanced to Knight Commander of the Order of the Bath on 2 June 1943.

Willis went on to be Commander-in-Chief, Levant in October 1943, he conducting naval operations in the Aegean Sea in support of the Dodecanese Campaign and then became Second Sea Lord in March 1944. In this capacity he arranged the manpower for the campaign in the Pacific Ocean against the Imperial Japanese Navy, earning promotion to full admiral on 16 October 1945. He was appointed a Knight Commander of the Order of the British Empire on 18 December 1945 and also awarded the Greek Grand Cross of the Royal Order of the Phoenix with Swords, First Class and the Greek War Cross, Second Class. He was also twice mentioned in dispatches.

=== Later career ===
Willis became Commander-in-Chief, Mediterranean Fleet in April 1946, in which role he was faced with unrest in Mandatory Palestine but rewarded with advancement to Knight Grand Cross of the Order of the Bath on 12 June 1947. Appointed a Knight of the Venerable Order of the Hospital of St John of Jerusalem on 5 January 1948, he became Commander-in-Chief, Portsmouth in July 1948 and was promoted to Admiral of the Fleet on 20 March 1949 before retiring in 1950. He attended the coronation of Queen Elizabeth II in June 1953. In retirement Willis lived in Petersfield in Hampshire. He became Deputy Lieutenant of Southampton and Chairman of the Trustees of the Imperial War Museum. He died at the Royal Naval Hospital, Haslar on 12 April 1976.

== Family ==
In September 1916 Willis married Olive Christine Millar, daughter of Henry Edward Millar and sister of Violet Helen Millar (who married Clement Attlee): they had two daughters.

== Sources ==
- Heathcote, Tony (2002). The British Admirals of the Fleet 1734–1995. Barnsley: Pen & Sword. ISBN 0-85052-835-6.
- Henderson, James (1994). The Frigates: An Account of the Lighter Warships of the Napoleonic Wars. Barnsley: Pen & Sword. ISBN 978-0-85052-432-1.

Military offices
Preceded by Sir Robert Raikes	Commander-in-Chief, South Atlantic Station; 1941–1942	Succeeded by Sir Campbell Tait
Preceded by Sir John Cunningham	Commander-in-Chief, Levant; October 1943–December 1943	Succeeded by Sir Bernard Rawlings
Preceded by Sir William Whitworth	Second Sea Lord; 1944–1946	Succeeded by Sir Arthur Power
Preceded by Sir John Cunningham	Commander-in-Chief, Mediterranean Fleet; 1946–1948	Succeeded by Sir Arthur Power
Preceded by Lord Fraser of North Cape	Commander-in-Chief, Portsmouth; 1948–1950	Succeeded by Sir Arthur Power
