= Rhoderick McGrigor =

Royal Navy Admiral of the Fleet (1893–1959)

Admiral of the Fleet Sir Rhoderick McGrigor GCB
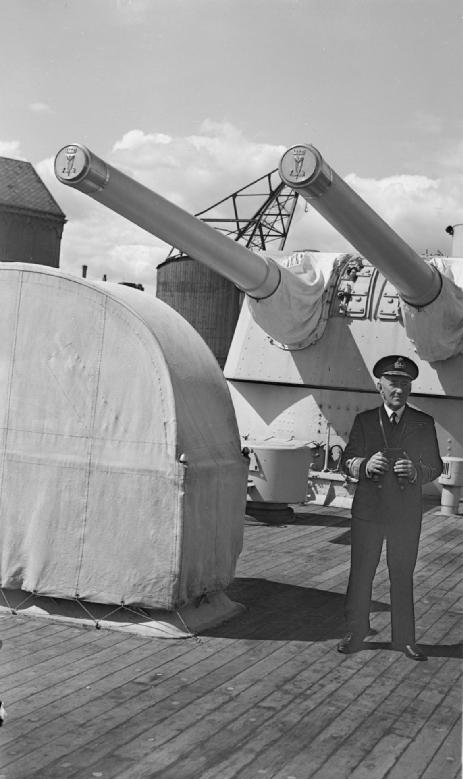
- Vice Admiral McGrigor on the deck of his flagship HMS Norfolk, June 1945
- Born: 12 April 1893; York, England
- Died: 3 December 1959 (aged 66); Tarland, Scotland
- Military career
- Allegiance: United Kingdom
- Branch: Royal Navy
- Service years: 1910–1955
- Rank: Admiral of the Fleet
- Commands: First Sea Lord; Plymouth Command; Commander-in-Chief Home Fleet; 1st Cruiser Squadron; Home Fleet aircraft carriers Flag Officer, Taranto and Adriatic; Flag Officer, Sicily; Force B at Pantellaria and Sicily; 4th Destroyer Flotilla; HMS Versatile
- Conflicts: First World War: Gallipoli campaign; Jutland; Second World War: Malta Convoys; Arctic Convoys
- Awards: Knight Grand Cross of the Order of the Bath; Mentioned in Despatches; Commander of the Royal Norwegian Order of St Olav

Admiral of the Fleet Sir Rhoderick Robert McGrigor, GCB (12 April 1893 – 3 December 1959) was a senior Royal Navy officer. He fought in the First World War and saw action during the Gallipoli Campaign and then the Battle of Jutland. He also served in the Second World War, taking part in the sinking of the Bismarck in May 1941, carrying out the office of Assistant Chief of the Naval Staff (Weapons) and commanding the 1st Cruiser Squadron during operations off the Norwegian coast and convoys to North Russia. Furthermore, he served as First Sea Lord in the early 1950s and is most remembered as a leading proponent of carrier-based air power.

== Naval career ==
=== Early career ===
Born the son of Major General Charles Rhoderic Robert McGrigor CB, CMG, late of the King's Royal Rifle Corps and Ada Rosamond McGrigor (née Bower), McGrigor spent his childhood in South Africa before returning to England in early 1906 for his education at the Royal Naval College, Osborne, and then the Royal Naval College, Dartmouth. Promoted to midshipman on 15 September 1910, McGrigor was posted to the battleship HMS Formidable in the Atlantic Fleet in April 1911. He transferred to the battleship HMS Africa in the Home Fleet in May 1912 and, having been promoted to sub-lieutenant on 15 January 1913, moved to the battleship HMS Agamemnon in the Home Fleet in October 1913 and then on to the destroyer HMS Foxhound in the Mediterranean Fleet in March 1914.

During the First World War, following his promotion to lieutenant on 15 October 1914, McGrigor saw action during the Gallipoli Campaign in 1915 and then transferred to the battleship HMS Malaya in the Grand Fleet in which he saw action at the Battle of Jutland.

McGrigor was posted to the cruiser HMS Highflyer in June 1919 and, having been promoted to lieutenant commander on 15 October 1922, he attended the War Staff Course at the Royal Naval Staff College in late 1923. After qualifying as a torpedo specialist, he became flotilla torpedo officer for the First Destroyer Flotilla in the Mediterranean Fleet in February 1925. Promoted to commander on 31 December 1927, he joined the staff of the Tactical School at Portsmouth and then became Staff Officer (Operations) to the Commander-in-Chief, Home Fleet in August 1930. He became commanding officer of the destroyer HMS Versatile in the Home Fleet in August 1932 and, having been promoted to captain on 31 December 1933, he joined the Training and Staff Duties Division of the Admiralty in August 1934.

McGrigor was appointed Captain (D), 4th Destroyer Flotilla (aboard HMS Campbell and then HMS Kempenfelt), with the Home Fleet in September 1936. On 26 August 1938, he became Chief of Staff to the Commander-in-Chief China Station (first on HMS Kent, then HMS Tamar, the RN base at Hong Kong) with promotion to commodore 2nd class.

=== Second World War ===
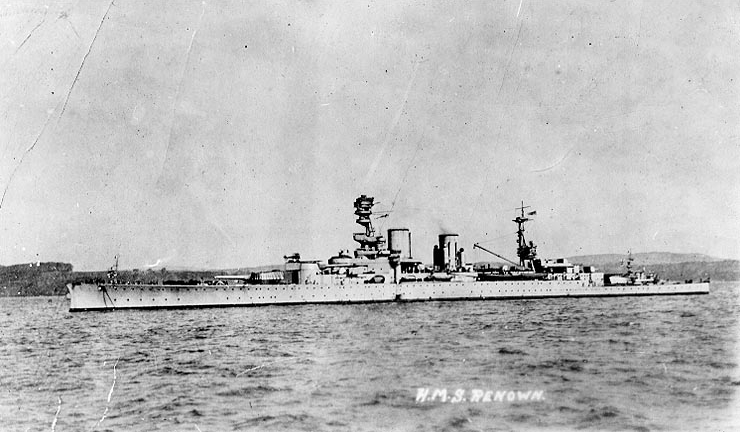
The battlecruiser HMS Renown, in which McGrigor took part in the sinking of the Bismarck

In early 1941, McGrigor was, briefly, Flag Captain, HMS Renown, flagship of Sir James Somerville and was involved in the Malta Convoys and other operations in the Atlantic and Mediterranean including the Bombardment of Genoa in February 1941 and the sinking of the Bismarck in May 1941. He was promoted to rear admiral on 8 July 1941. Between 9 September 1941 and early 1943, he was Assistant Chief of the Naval Staff (Weapons). In late 1943, he commanded the Naval Force (Force B) covering the capture of the Italian island of Pantelleria (Operation Corkscrew) and the subsequent Invasion of Sicily for which he was awarded the Distinguished Service Order. He served as Flag Officer, Sicily, where he was wounded, for three months before being redeployed as Flag Officer, Taranto and Adriatic (based at the shore establishment HMS Hannibal) until the end of 1943.

Appointed a Companion of the Order of the Bath in the 1944 New Year Honours, McGrigor briefly commanded Home Fleet aircraft carriers at the start of the year. From 27 March 1944 he was Rear Admiral commanding 1st Cruiser Squadron (with HMS Kent and then HMS Norfolk as his flagship) participating in operations off the Norwegian coast and convoys to North Russia. He was mentioned in despatches for Operation Counterblast (the destruction of enemy shipping off the south-west coast of Norway in November 1944). From 8 April 1945 he also held the post of Second-in-Command Home Fleet, receiving promotion to vice admiral on 15 April 1945. The final air-raid of the war in Europe, Operation Judgement, took place in North Norway under McGrigor's command on 4 May 1945. On 7 June 1945 with the 1st Cruiser Squadron he conveyed King Haakon to Oslo on his return to Norway after five years in Britain, for which he was awarded the honour of Commander of the Norwegian Order of St. Olav. He was advanced to Knight Commander of the Order of the Bath in the 1945 Birthday Honours.

=== Post-war service ===
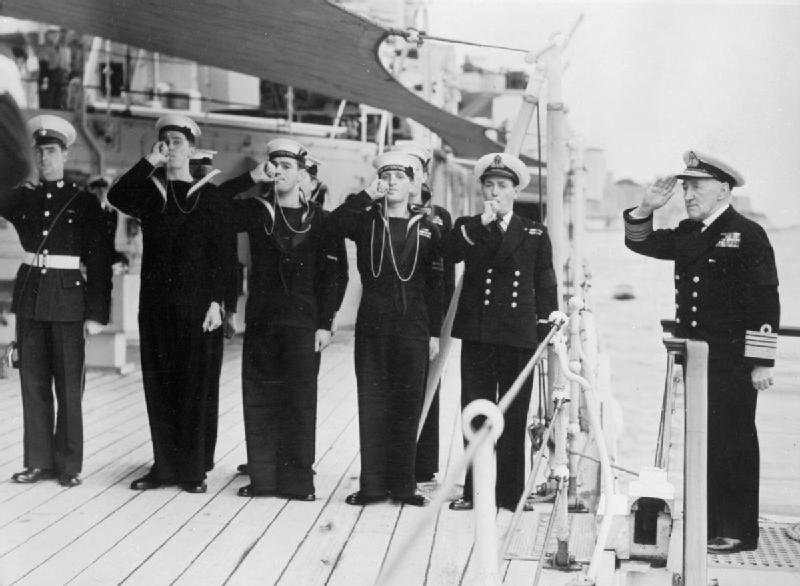
McGrigor being piped on board the cruiser HMS Liverpool at Valletta, Malta, in 1952

From 1945 onwards, McGrigor was appointed to a number of influential shore posts. He became Vice Chief of the Naval Staff in October 1945 and, having been promoted to full admiral on 2 September 1948, he became Commander-in-Chief, Home Fleet in January 1949. McGrigor also commanded Exercise Verity, a major multi-lateral naval exercise for the Western Union Defense Organization (WUDO), in 1949 and went on to be Commander-in-Chief, Plymouth in March 1950. He was advanced to Knight Grand Cross of the Order of the Bath in the 1951 New Year Honours.

McGrigor became First Sea Lord and Chief of Naval Staff on 20 December 1951 and, having attended the funeral of King George VI in February 1952, he was appointed First and Principal Naval Aide-de-Camp to Queen Elizabeth II on 1 April 1952. He also attended the coronation of The Queen in June 1953. As First Sea Lord he was a leading proponent of carrier-based air power and revived the title of Fleet Air Arm (which had been renamed "Naval Aviation" in 1946). He was promoted to Admiral of the Fleet on 1 May 1953 and retired in April 1955.

McGrigor received honorary degrees of LLD from the University of St Andrews in 1953 and the University of Aberdeen in 1955; he was Rector of the University of Aberdeen from 1954 to 1957. In retirement his interests included shooting and fishing at his home at Tarland in Aberdeenshire. He died following an operation in Aberdeen on 3 December 1959.

== Sources ==
- Heathcote, Tony (2002). The British Admirals of the Fleet 1734 – 1995. Pen & Sword Ltd. ISBN 0-85052-835-6.

Military offices
| Preceded by Sir Edward Syfret | Vice Chief of the Naval Staff; 1945–1947 | Succeeded by Sir John Edelsten |
| Preceded by Sir Edward Syfret | Commander in Chief, Home Fleet; 1948–1950 | Succeeded by Sir Philip Vian |
| Preceded by Sir Robert Burnett | Commander-in-Chief, Plymouth; 1950–1951 | Succeeded by Sir Maurice Mansergh |
| Preceded by The Lord Fraser of North Cape | First Sea Lord; 1951–1955 | Succeeded by The Earl Mountbatten of Burma |
Honorary titles
| Preceded by Sir Arthur Power | First and Principal Naval Aide-de-Camp; 1952–1953 | Succeeded by Sir John Edelsten |
Academic offices
| Preceded by Jimmy Edwards | Rector of the University of Aberdeen; 1954–1957 | Succeeded by The Lord Bannerman of Kildonan |
