= HMS Cleopatra (33) =

Dido-class cruiser of the Royal Navy

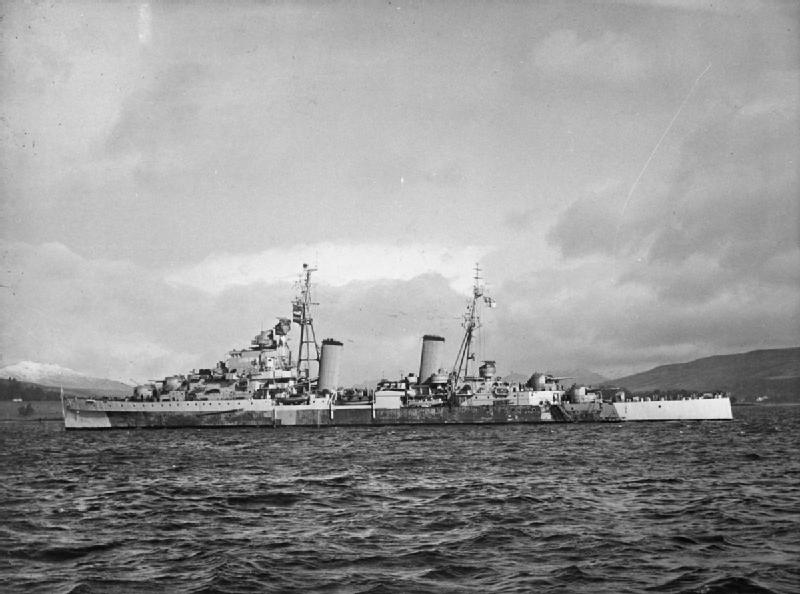
- Cleopatra at anchor in the Clyde, April 1945

History

United Kingdom
- Name: Cleopatra
- Builder: Hawthorn Leslie and Company, (Hebburn-on-Tyne, UK)
- Laid down: 5 January 1939
- Launched: 27 March 1940
- Commissioned: 5 December 1941
- Decommissioned: 15 February 1953
- Identification: Pennant number: 33
- Fate: Scrapped, 15 December 1958

General characteristics (as built)
- Class & type: Dido-class light cruiser
- Displacement: 5,600 long tons (5,700 t) (standard); 6,850 long tons (6,960 t) (full load)
- Length: 485 ft (148 m) p.p.; 512 ft (156 m) o/a
- Beam: 50 ft 6 in (15.39 m)
- Draught: 14 ft (4.3 m)
- Installed power: 62,000 shp (46,000 kW)
- Propulsion: 4 × Parsons geared steam turbines; 4 × Admiralty 3-drum boilers; 4 × shafts
- Speed: 32.25 knots (59.73 km/h; 37.11 mph)
- Range: 1,500 miles (2,400 km; 1,300 nmi) at 30 knots (56 km/h; 35 mph); 4,240 mi (6,820 km; 3,680 nmi) at 16 knots (30 km/h; 18 mph)
- Complement: 480
- Sensors & processing systems: Radar; Surface 274; Target Indicator 293; Surface DC 284; Anti Aircraft DC 285(3); Air Warning 281B
- Armament: 10 × 5.25 in (133 mm) dual purpose guns, 2 × 2-pounder (40 mm) pom-pom guns, 2 × quad 2 pdr (40 mm) pom-pom guns, 2 × triple 21 in (533 mm) torpedo tubes.
- Armour: Belt: 3 in (7.6 cm); Deck: 1 in (2.5 cm); Magazines: 2 in (5.1 cm); Bulkheads: 1 in (2.5 cm)

HMS Cleopatra was a Dido-class cruiser of the Royal Navy. She was built by R. and W. Hawthorn, Leslie and Company, Limited (Hebburn-on-Tyne, UK), with the keel being laid down on 5 January 1939. She was launched on 27 March 1940, and commissioned on 5 December 1941.

== Second World War service ==
Cleopatra went out to Gibraltar early in 1942, and on 9 February she sailed for Malta, where she was immediately damaged by a bomb. After repair, she was transferred to Alexandria in early March for the 15th Cruiser Squadron. She was Admiral Philip Vian's flagship during the Second Battle of Sirte, when his group of four light cruisers and 17 destroyers held off an Italian force which included the battleship Littorio, two heavy cruisers, a light cruiser and 10 destroyers, which had all been sent to intercept their convoy to Malta. During the engagement, Cleopatra's radar and wireless stations were wrecked by a 6" round fired by the Italian light cruiser Giovanni delle Bande Nere. Other reports state that Cleopatra's after turrets were also damaged. In June 1942, she covered Operation Harpoon and Vigorous, and in August bombarded Rhodes as a diversion for the Operation Pedestal convoy.

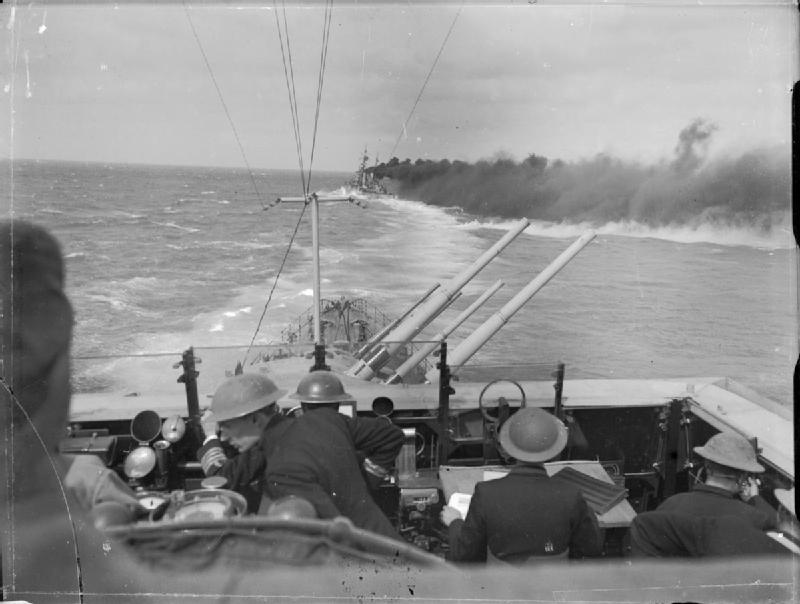
Cleopatra throws out smoke to shield the convoy as Euryalus elevates her forward 5.25 in (133 mm) guns to shell the Italian Fleet during the Second Battle of Sirte, 22 March 1942

Cleopatra was dry docked in Massawa on 19 September 1942 for minor repairs and cleaning and was un-docked five days later. During the refloating, she slipped on the angled dry dock, crushing every wooden keel block on the dock but sustaining little hull damage. Captain Guy Grantham considered the resulting leak a minor nuisance and ordered Cleopatra to return to service.

By January 1943, Cleopatra was part of Force "K", later Force "Q" at Bône, from where the Axis traffic to and from Tunisia was attacked. Later, she was a unit of the 12th Cruiser Squadron, and was present at the landings in Sicily, Operation Husky, in June, followed by supporting the army ashore. On 16 July 1943, Cleopatra was torpedoed by the Italian submarine Dandolo and again badly damaged. Temporary repairs were made at Malta which lasted until October 1943, after which she sailed to Philadelphia, US, for full repairs. Like HMS Phoebe, Cleopatra was fitted with quad Bofors in place of its pom poms. Mediterranean experience had shown that air attacks over the bow were common, and more forward fire power was provided with the quad Bofors in "B" position. These were completed in November 1944, and in 1945 she went out to the East Indies, where she was the first ship into the newly recaptured Singapore Naval Base in September.

== Post war service ==
Cleopatra served post-war with the 5th Cruiser Squadron in the East Indies until returning to Portsmouth on 7 February 1946 to refit. Thereafter, she joined the Home Fleet, 2nd Cruiser Squadron, from 1946 to early 1951 and after a major refit and minimal update with the quad Bofors landed and replaced by 3 twin Mk 5 40 mm guns. In 1948 she was commanded by Peter Reid. She served in the Mediterranean from late 1951 to early 1953. While in the Mediterranean, she took a starring role in the 1953 film of C.S. Forester's Brown on Resolution, (called Sailor of the King in Britain, and Single-handed in the United States). Cleopatra plays both the fictional Royal Navy ships "HMS Amesbury" and "HMS Stratford". As Amesbury she is heroically sunk by the more powerful German raider Essen, (portrayed by HMS Manxman with large mock-up gun turrets), and as Stratford, she triumphs at the end of the story. The two battle sequences depict this open-bridge light-cruiser firing her guns and torpedoes in some detail.

She returned to Chatham on 12 February 1953 to be paid off. In June of that year she took part in the Fleet Review to celebrate the Coronation of Queen Elizabeth II. From late 1953 to 1956 Cleopatra was flagship of the reserve squadron. On 15 December 1958, she arrived at the Newport yard of John Cashmore Ltd for breaking up.

== Publications ==
- Campbell, N.J.M. (1980). "Great Britain". In Chesneau, Roger (ed.). Conway's All the World's Fighting Ships 1922–1946. New York: Mayflower Books. pp. 2–85. ISBN 0-8317-0303-2.
- Colledge, J. J.; Warlow, Ben (2006) [1969]. Ships of the Royal Navy: The Complete Record of All Fighting Ships of the Royal Navy from the 15th Century to the Present (3rd Rev ed.). London: Chatham Publishing. ISBN 978-1-86176-281-8. OCLC 67375475.
- Friedman, Norman (2010). British Cruisers: Two World Wars and After. Barnsley, UK: Seaforth Publishing. ISBN 978-1-59114-078-8.
- Raven, Alan & Roberts, John (1980). British Cruisers of World War Two. Annapolis, Maryland: Naval Institute Press. ISBN 0-87021-922-7.
- Rohwer, Jürgen (2005). Chronology of the War at Sea 1939–1945: The Naval History of World War Two (3rd rev ed.). Annapolis, Maryland: Naval Institute Press. ISBN 1-59114-119-2.
- Whitley, M. J. (1995). Cruisers of World War Two: An International Encyclopedia. London: Cassell. ISBN 1-86019-874-0.
