= Force B =

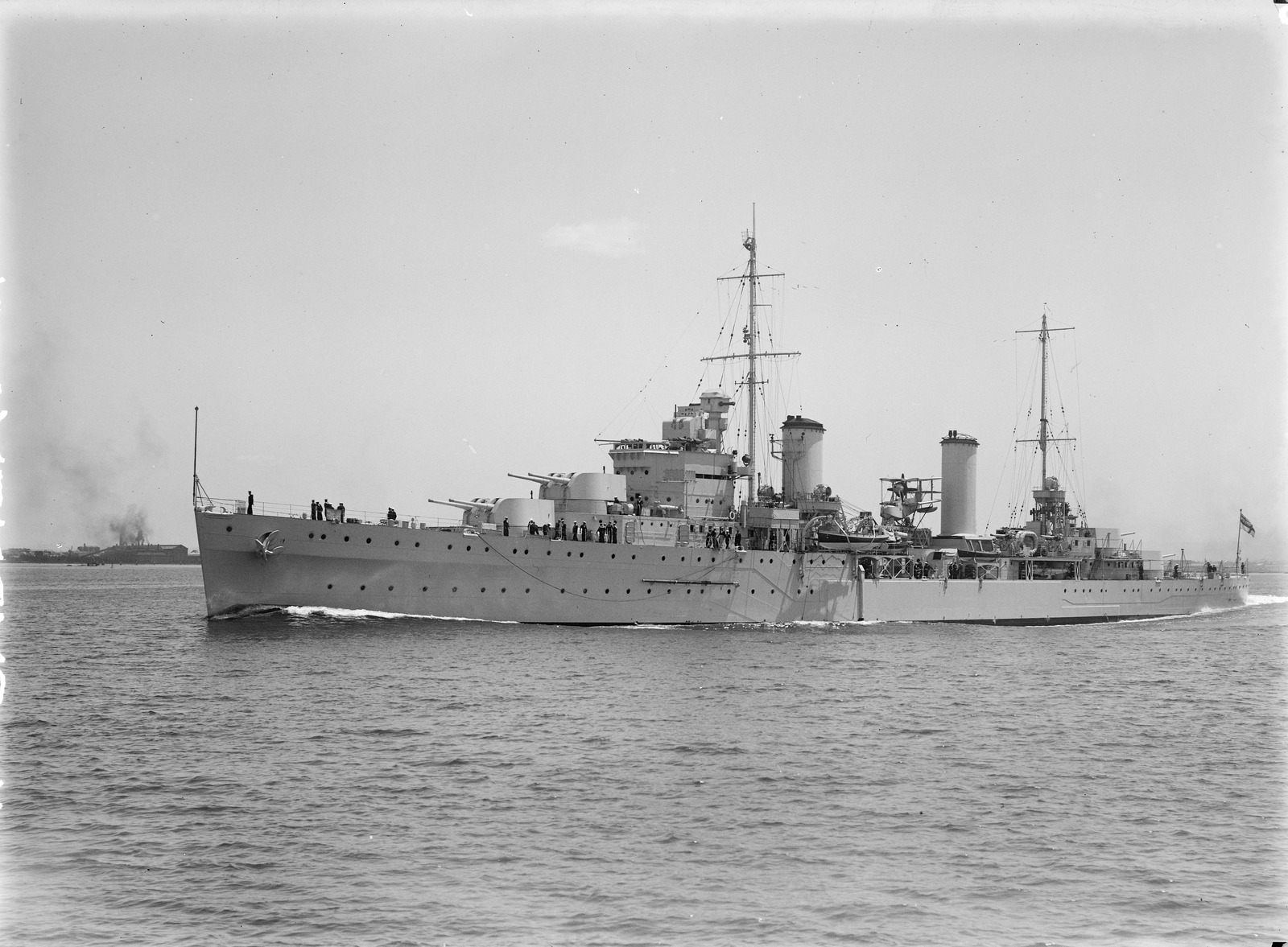
- HMAS Sydney, part of the first Force B
- Active: 1940–1942
- Country: United Kingdom
- Branch: Royal Navy
- Engagements: Battle of the Mediterranean; Battle of Calabria; Operation MB8; Battle of Cape Matapan; Operation Judgement; First Battle of Sirte; Asiatic-Pacific Theater; Indian Ocean raid

Commanders
- Notable commanders: Bernard Rawlings; Algernon Willis; Andrew Cunningham; Henry Pridham-Wippell

Force B was the name of several British Royal Navy forces during the Second World War. The term was used for ad hoc collections of ships of less than a fleet and for complicated operations in which several groups of ships were used, often for short periods, such as convoy operations, before the force was dissolved and the ships dispersed to other activities; the force could be revived and disbanded several times.

== Mediterranean ==
=== 1940 ===
Force B was first formed by the Mediterranean Fleet in July 1940. Comprising the battleship Warspite and five destroyers, it saw action at the Battle of Calabria under the command of Vice Admiral Andrew Cunningham. In November 1940, it was involved in Operation MB8, a complicated operation involving several forces with different but co-ordinated aims. During this period Force B comprised the cruisers HMS Ajax and HMAS Sydney and delivered reinforcements to Crete. The force sailed on 4 November with Convoy AN 6 en route to Greece, departing that evening to Crete, then heading north to join Force C (the cruiser HMS Orion) at Pireaus. From there the combined force under the command of Vice Admiral Henry Pridham-Wippell moved east into the Straits of Otranto to divert the Italian Fleet whilst the balance of the British forces attacked the port of Taranto in the Battle of Taranto (Operation Judgement). Whilst in the straits, the cruisers fought the Action in the Strait of Otranto after they intercepted and sank an Italian convoy of four ships.

=== 1941 ===
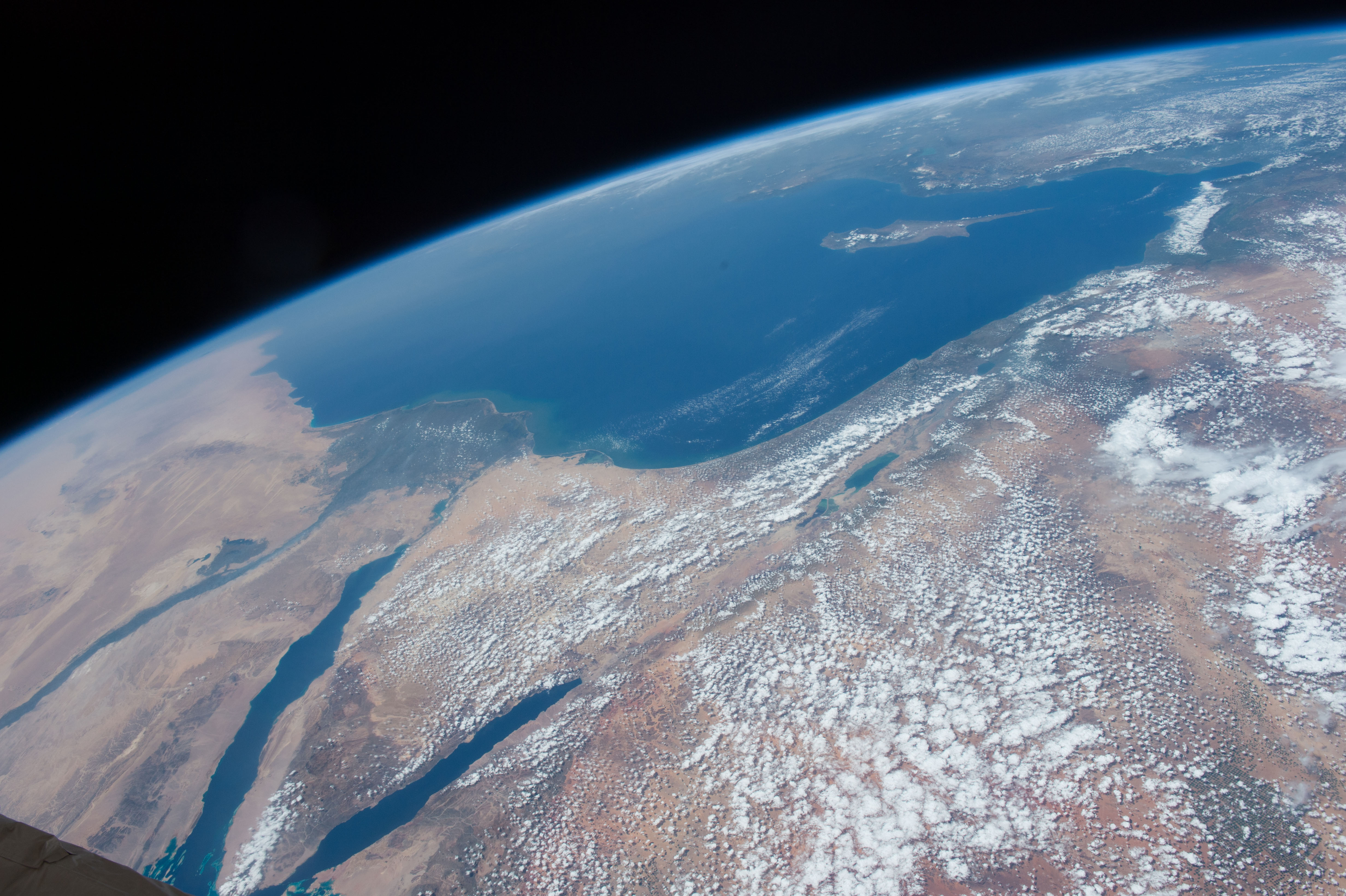
Photograph of the eastern Mediterranean Middle East from the International Space Station

In March 1941, again under Pridham-Whippell, Ajax and the cruisers Orion, Gloucester and Perth formed Force B in an operation to bring the Italian fleet to battle, resulting in the Battle of Cape Matapan. In June, Force B was re-formed to assist Allied forces in the Syria–Lebanon Campaign with Ajax, Phoebe and four destroyers. During this period, ships of the force were engaged by Vichy submarine Caïman, which was damaged in a two-hour hunt and the destroyers Guépard (Cheetah) and Valmy, which left the destroyer Janus badly damaged.

In November, Force B (Rear Admiral Bernard Rawlings), comprising Ajax, Neptune and the destroyers HMS Kandahar and Jaguar was moved to Malta to reinforce the ships of Force K and to carry out offensive sweeps against Axis supply ships en route to Libya. On 19 December, after taking part in conveying a supply ship into Malta in Operation MD8, which had led to the First Battle of Sirte, Force B was deployed to find the Italian convoy encountered in that engagement but fell foul of a minefield off Tripoli, resulting in the loss of Neptune and Kandahar and damage to two other ships. After this, forces B and K were withdrawn from Malta.

== Indian Ocean ==
=== 1942 ===
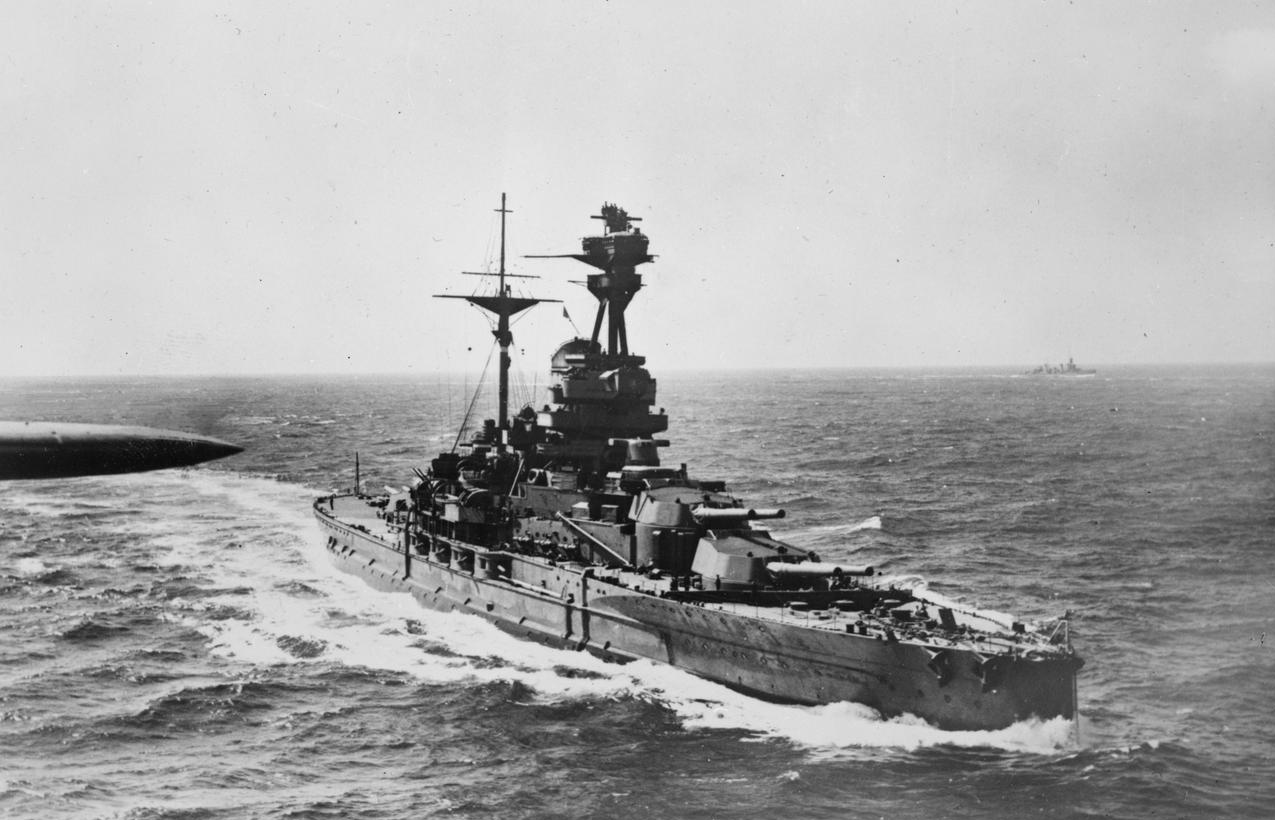
HMS Revenge at sea

With the outbreak of war in the Pacific and the advance of the Japanese on Malaya and the Dutch East Indies, British naval forces in the Far east were forced to retreat, first to Java, then to Trincomalee in Ceylon. In March 1942, Admiral James Somerville took command of a force of 29 warships, many approaching obsolescence. To remedy this deficiency he divided his ships into fast and slow divisions, Force A and Force B respectively. This Force B (Rear Admiral Algernon Willis) comprised four First World War-vintage Revenge-class battleships, the light carrier HMS Hermes, the cruisers HMS Caledon and Dragon and destroyers HMS Decoy, Fortune, Griffin and Scout. The ships were joined by Dutch cruiser HNLMS Jacob van Heemskerck and destroyer Isaac Sweers and the Royal Australian Navy (RAN) destroyers HMAS Norman and Vampire.

This force was attacked during the Japanese Indian Ocean raid and on 9 April Hermes and Vampire were sunk by aircraft from the Japanese carrier strike force Kido Butai (Mobile Strike Force). Force B was withdrawn to Kilindini, in British East Africa, where it was based until it could be reinforced. Force B's only big action, apart from escort duty was to support Operation Ironclad, the invasion of Vichy-held Madagascar, in May 1942. HMS Ramillies was attacked and damaged by Japanese midget submarines in Diego Suarez harbour.

== See also ==
- Force H
- Force K
- Force Z
