= Charles Gage Stuart =

Royal Navy officer

Rear-Admiral Charles Gage Stuart DSO DSC
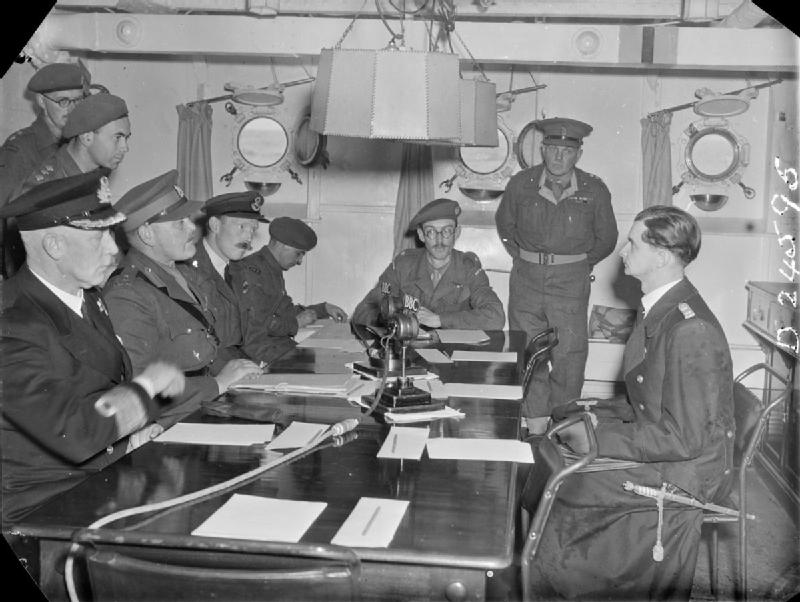
- Rear-Admiral Stuart (at left, wearing the uniform of a captain) in 1945
- Born: 2 February 1887
- Died: 1970
- Military career
- Allegiance: United Kingdom
- Branch: Royal Navy
- Rank: Rear-Admiral
- Commands: HMS Curlew; HMS Voyager; HMS Obedient
- Conflicts: First World War; Russian Civil War; Second World War
- Awards: Distinguished Service Order; Distinguished Service Cross; Mentioned in dispatches

Rear-Admiral Charles Gage Stuart, DSO, DSC (2 February 1887 – 1970) was a Royal Navy officer who, at the end of the Second World War, became Head of the Military Government of Guernsey.

== Naval career ==
Stuart joined the Royal Navy in 1902. On 22 April 1907 he was confirmed in the rank of Sub-Lieutenant, dated 15 September 1906. He served in the First World War, earning the Distinguished Service Cross for his role in the sinking of the German Cruiser SMS Dresden at the Battle of Más a Tierra in March 1915. He later received the Distinguished Service Order for service in the Baltic Sea in 1919.

Stuart became Captain of the Dockyard at Malta in 1932, Captain of the Dockyard at Chatham in 1935 and Captain-in-Charge at Simon's Town in 1937. He came to prominence at the end of the Second World War when he took control of the Island of Guernsey from the Germans in May 1945 and led a military government there until he was relieved by Lieutenant General Sir Philip Neame, the first post-war Lieutenant Governor of Guernsey in August 1945.

== Family ==
In 1916 he married Elizabeth Ellen Buckland; they had two sons and two daughters.

Government offices
Suspended German occupation	Head of the British Military Government in Guernsey; May–August 1945	Succeeded by Sir Philip Neame
