= Donald Gibson (Royal Navy officer) =

Royal Navy Vice Admiral and Fleet Air Arm pilot (1916–2000)

Vice-Admiral Sir Donald Gibson KCB DSC
- Born: Donald Cameron Ernest Forbes Gibson; 17 March 1916
- Died: 22 November 2000 (aged 84)
- Military career
- Allegiance: United Kingdom
- Branch: Royal Navy
- Service years: 1933–1968
- Rank: Vice-Admiral
- Unit: Fleet Air Arm
- Commands: Flag Officer Naval Air Command; Flag Officer Naval Flying Training; Flag Officer, Aircraft Carriers; HMS Ark Royal; HMS Dainty; RNAS Brawdy; 17th Carrier Air Group; 780 Naval Air Squadron; 802 Naval Air Squadron; 803 Naval Air Squadron
- Conflicts: Second World War
- Awards: Knight Commander of the Order of the Bath; Distinguished Service Cross
- Other work: Director of the HMS Belfast Trust

Vice-Admiral Sir Donald Cameron Ernest Forbes Gibson, KCB, DSC (17 March 1916 – 22 November 2000) was a senior officer of the Royal Navy and a Fleet Air Arm aviator. He served as a fighter pilot during the Second World War, later holding several senior Royal Navy appointments, including Flag Officer, Aircraft Carriers, Flag Officer Naval Flying Training and Flag Officer Naval Air Command. After retiring from the Royal Navy in 1968, he became the first director of the HMS Belfast Trust.

== Early life and naval career ==
Gibson was born on 17 March 1916 and educated at Woodbridge School in Suffolk. He joined the Royal Naval Reserve as a midshipman in 1933 and served aboard the battleship HMS Nelson and the destroyer HMS Wanderer. He transferred to the regular Royal Navy in 1937 and subsequently volunteered for pilot training, receiveing his Fleet Air Arm wings in 1939.

=== Second World War ===
Gibson served with Fleet Air Arm fighter squadrons during the war. He was with 804 Naval Air Squadron from January to June 1940, flying Gloster Sea Gladiators and with 803 Naval Air Squadron from August 1940. The latter operated with Blackburn Skua and Fairey Fulmar.

Gibson was wounded during operations in the Mediterranean in April 1941. On 18 April his Fairey Fulmar was hit during an engagement with an Italian aircraft while he was serving aboard the Illustrious-class aircraft carrier HMS Formidable. The aircraft crashed into the sea during an attempted landing aboard the carrier. Gibson was rescued by the destroyer HMS Hereward, but his observer was lost.

Gibson was appointed commanding officer of 803 Naval Air Squadron on 20 July 1941, when the squadron operated with Hawker Hurricanes. On 11 November 1941, Gibson took over as commanding officer of 802 Naval Air Squadron. The squadron operated Grumman Martlet fighters from the escort carrier HMS Audacity during Atlantic convoy operations. The squadron was disbanded on 21 December 1941, following the sinking of HMS Audacity by U-741. 802 Naval Air Squadron was re-formed on 1 February 1942, with Gibson again its commanding officer until April 1942.

In 1943, Gibson was involved in the training of Fleet Air Arm fighter pilots at the Royal Navy Fighter Course at Naval Air Station Miami, Florida, United States. Gibson was the officer in charge of the course and he and other instructors produced a 32-page fighter-training manual entitled Straight from the Horse's Mouth, which covered subjects including strafing, formation flying and escort duties.

Gibson spent the final year of the war on the staff of the Naval Assistant to the Second Sea Lord.

=== Post-war service ===
In March 1946, Gibson was appointed commanding officer of 780 Naval Air Squadron when the squadron reformed at RNAS Hinstock, Shropshire, as the Naval Advanced Flying School. He was also appointed to command 758A Flight, part of the Naval Advanced Instrument Flying School, also at RNAS Hinstock, on 4 April 1946. The Flight was disbanded on 14 May that year, when 758 Naval Air Squadron was absorbed into 780 Naval Air Squadron. In the 780 Squadron sequence, Gibson's tenure in charge ended when the squadron moved to RNAS Crail, Fife, on 17 December 1946.

Gibson subsequently served aboard the name ship of her class the aircraft carrier HMS Illustrious. He was promoted to commander in December 1949. In March of that year, while commanding the 17th Carrier Air Group, he was flying a Hawker Sea Fury during an exercise over the English Channel when its engine stopped. He ditched the aircraft and escaped from it after his parachute opened as he was leaving the cockpit.

His subsequent appointments included Commander (Air) at RNAS Culdrose, HMS Seahawk, Cornwall and on the Illustrious-class aircraft carrier HMS Indomitable and the Colossus-class light aircraft carrier HMS Glory. He was promoted to captain on 30 June 1954. His appointments as captain included command of the RNAS Brawdy, HMS Goldcrest, Pembrokeshire, command of the destroyer HMS Dainty in the Mediterranean Fleet and service as Deputy Director of the Admiralty's Air Warfare Division.

=== HMS Ark Royal ===
In 1961, Gibson took command of the Audacious-class aircraft carrier HMS Ark Royal.

On 16 January 1962, HMS Ark Royal grounded while proceeding towards Devonport Dockyard. Gibson, as the ship's captain, and the navigating officer were tried by court martial and convicted. The Board of Admiralty subsequently reviewed the proceedings and quashed the findings because the evidence did not support them.

The grounding was attributed to a navigational buoy being out of position, although the parliamentary statement recording the quashing of the convictions does not explicitly identify the cause of the grounding.

=== Senior Royal Navy appointments ===
Gibson was promoted to rear admiral in 1963. His flag appointments included Flag Officer, Aircraft Carriers from 1963 to 1964 and Flag Officer Naval Flying Training from 1964 to 1965. In October 1965 he became Flag Officer Naval Air Command, a post he held until 1968. He was promoted to vice admiral in 1967 and retired from the Royal Navy in 1968.

He was appointed a Companion of the Order of the Bath in the 1965 New Year Honours and advanced to a Knight Commander of the Order of the Bath in the 1968 Birthday Honours.

== Later life ==
After retiring from the Royal Navy, Gibson became the first director of the HMS Belfast Trust. The Trust was established to preserve the former cruiser as a museum ship. HMS Belfast was opened to the public in London in October 1971.

Gibson published his memoir, Haul Taut and Belay: The Memoirs of a Flying Sailor, in 1992.

He died on 22 November 2000, aged 84.
