= 780 Naval Air Squadron =

Inactive flying squadron of the Royal Navy's Fleet Air Arm

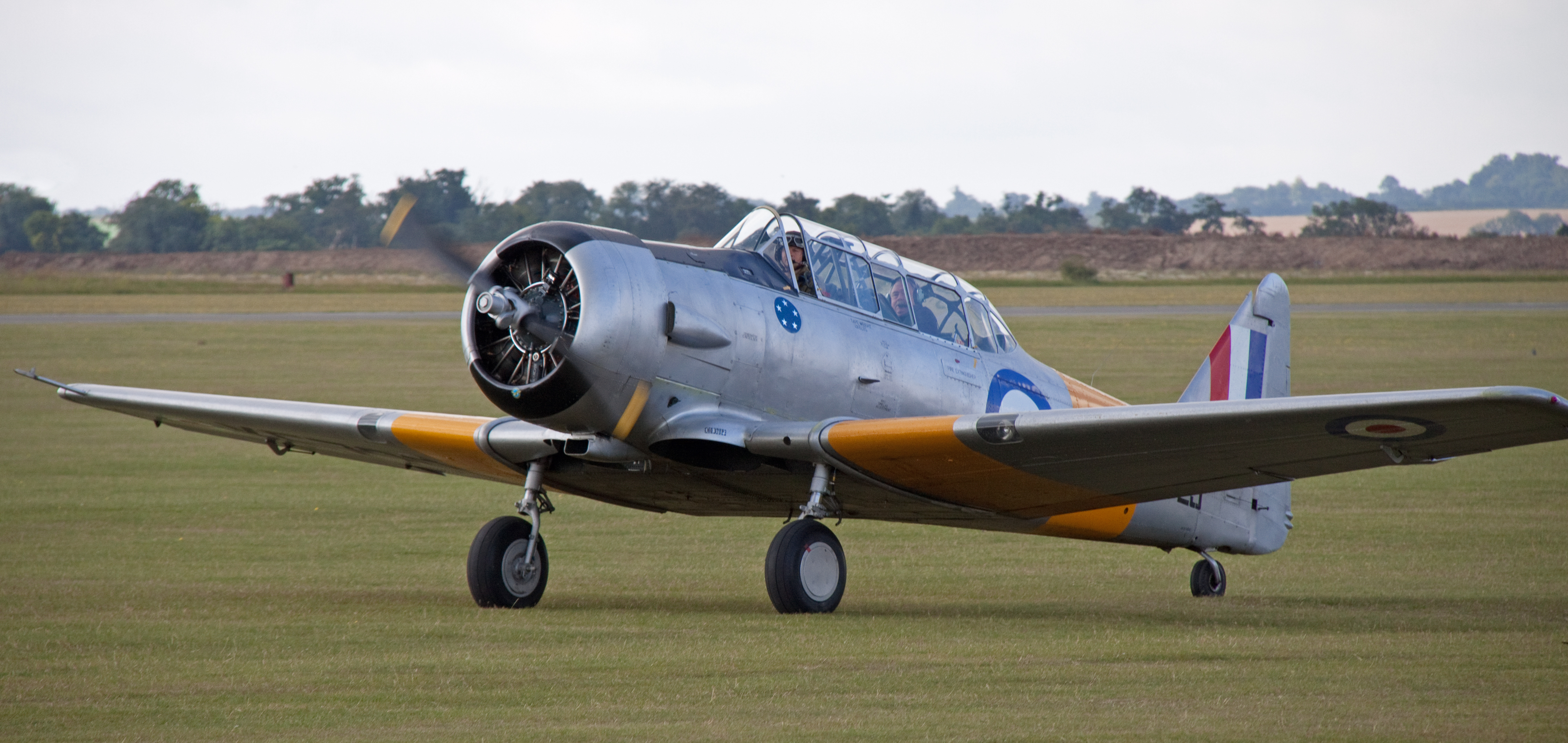
- North American Harvard; an example of the type used by 780 NAS
- Active: 1939–1945; 1946–1949
- Disbanded: 16 November 1949
- Country: United Kingdom
- Branch: Royal Navy
- Type: Fleet Air Arm Second Line Squadron
- Role: Conversion Course Unit; Naval Advanced Flying School
- Size: Squadron
- Part of: Fleet Air Arm
- Home station: See Naval air stations section for full list.
- Aircraft: See Aircraft flown section for full list.

Insignia
- Identification Markings: individual numbers L1A+ (1943); BY1A+ (October 1943); L1A+ (November 1944); U1A+ to U3A+ (March 1946); 201-206 (Harvard 1947); 601-614 (Oxford 1947)
- Fin Shore Codes: CW (1947)

780 Naval Air Squadron (780 NAS), also known as 780 Squadron, is an inactive Fleet Air Arm (FAA) naval air squadron of the United Kingdom's Royal Navy (RN) which last operated with de Havilland Mosquito T Mk.III trainer aircraft and Supermarine Seafire F Mk 45 fighter aircraft at HMS Seahawk, RNAS Culdrose, Cornwall, in November 1949.

780 Naval Air Squadron formed at HMS Raven, RNAS Eastleigh, Hampshire, as a Conversion Course Unit, in October 1939, to train experienced civilian pilots in naval flying. It moved to HMS Daedalus, RNAS Lee-on-Solent, Hampshire, in October 1940, and later, its role had changed to converting pilots to Fairey Barracuda aircraft. It spent a year at RNAS Charlton Horethorne, before returning to HMS Daedalus and disbanded, early 1945.

In March 1946, the squadron reformed at HMS Godwit, RNAS Hinstock, Shropshire, as the Naval Advanced Flying School, to give flying instructors' courses, and later provided Instrument Flying Training. In December, the squadron moved to HMS Jackdaw, RNAS Crail, Fife, Scotland, then in March 1947 moved to HMS Merlin, RNAS Donibristle, Fife and in May to HMS Seahawk, Cornwall, as the first resident unit.

== History ==
=== Conversion Course Unit (1939–1945) ===
780 Naval Air Squadron formed at RNAS Eastleigh (HMS Raven), Hampshire, on 2 October 1939, as a Conversion Course Unit. The squadron was tasked with training experienced civilian pilots in naval flying and it operated a variety of aircraft, including Hawker Hart Trainer, a two-seat dual-control trainer aircraft, Hawker Nimrod, a British biplane fighter aircraft, Blackburn Shark, a biplane torpedo bomber, de Havilland Gipsy Moth, a biplane trainer aircraft, de Havilland Tiger Moth, a biplane trainer aircraft, Percival Proctor, a radio trainer and communications aircraft, Fairey Swordfish, a biplane torpedo bomber and Percival Vega Gull, a military trainer and communications aircraft. Essentially this was a mixture of obsolete and civil aircraft and the expectation was this task would be completed within a few months, however, other types of conversion was required.

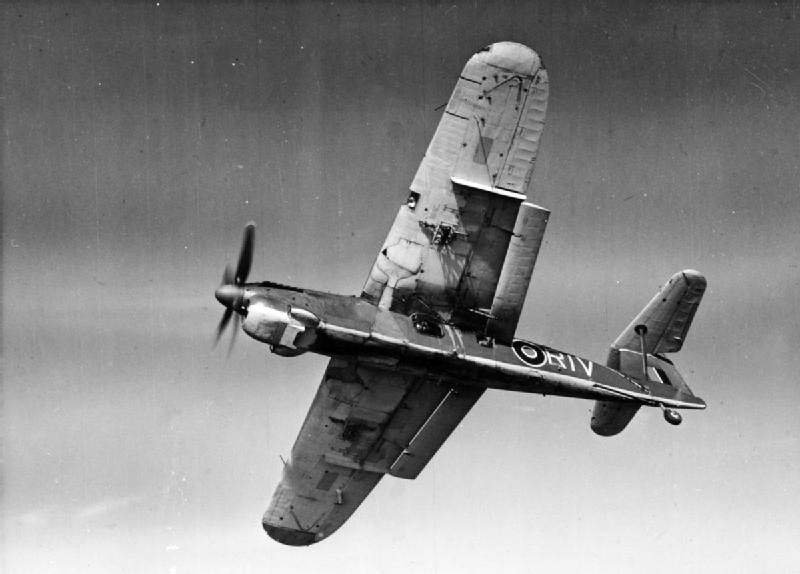
Fairey Barracuda Mk II

The squadron relocated to RNAS Lee-on-Solent (HMS Daedalus), in Hampshire, on 7 October 1940. It used Hamble as a relief landing ground and by August 1943, its role had changed to converting pilots of Fairey Swordfish and another biplane torpedo bomber, Fairey Albacore, to the monoplane Fairey Barracuda torpedo and dive bomber, although this task soon passed to 798 Naval Air Squadron.

On 9 October 1943, 780 Naval Air Squadron moved to RNAS Charlton Horethorne (HMS Heron II). With the upcoming invasion of occupied France there was a need to clear RNAS Lee-on-Solent and the area of training aircraft. It moved back to RNAS Lee-on-Solent on 28 November 1944, where it disbanded into 794 Naval Air Squadron, on 2 January 1945.

=== Naval Advanced Flying School (1946–1949) ===
780 Naval Air Squadron reformed at RNAS Hinstock (HMS Godwit), in Shropshire, England, on 28 March 1946, as the Naval Advanced Flying School, but operated out of its satellite station RNAS Peplow (HMS Godwit II), Shropshire. It was equipped with a variety of aircraft and was set up to give flying instructors' courses.

It also received a number of Avro Lancaster, a four-engine heavy bomber, which were initially destined for 734 Naval Air Squadron at HMS Godwit, used for multi-engine experience. 758 Naval Air Squadron disbanded and was absorbed in May as 'B' Flight, of 780 Squadron, and Instrument Flying Training at this point had become the squadron’s focus. In December the squadron moved to Scotland, relocating to RNAS Crail (HMS Jackdaw), Fife, for a short stay before moving to RNAS Donibristle (HMS Merlin), Fife, in March 1947 and then in May to RNAS Culdrose (HMS Seahawk), Cornwall, as the initial unit there. On 16 November 1949, 780 Naval Air Squadron disbanded.

== Aircraft flown ==
The squadron operated a number of different aircraft types, including:

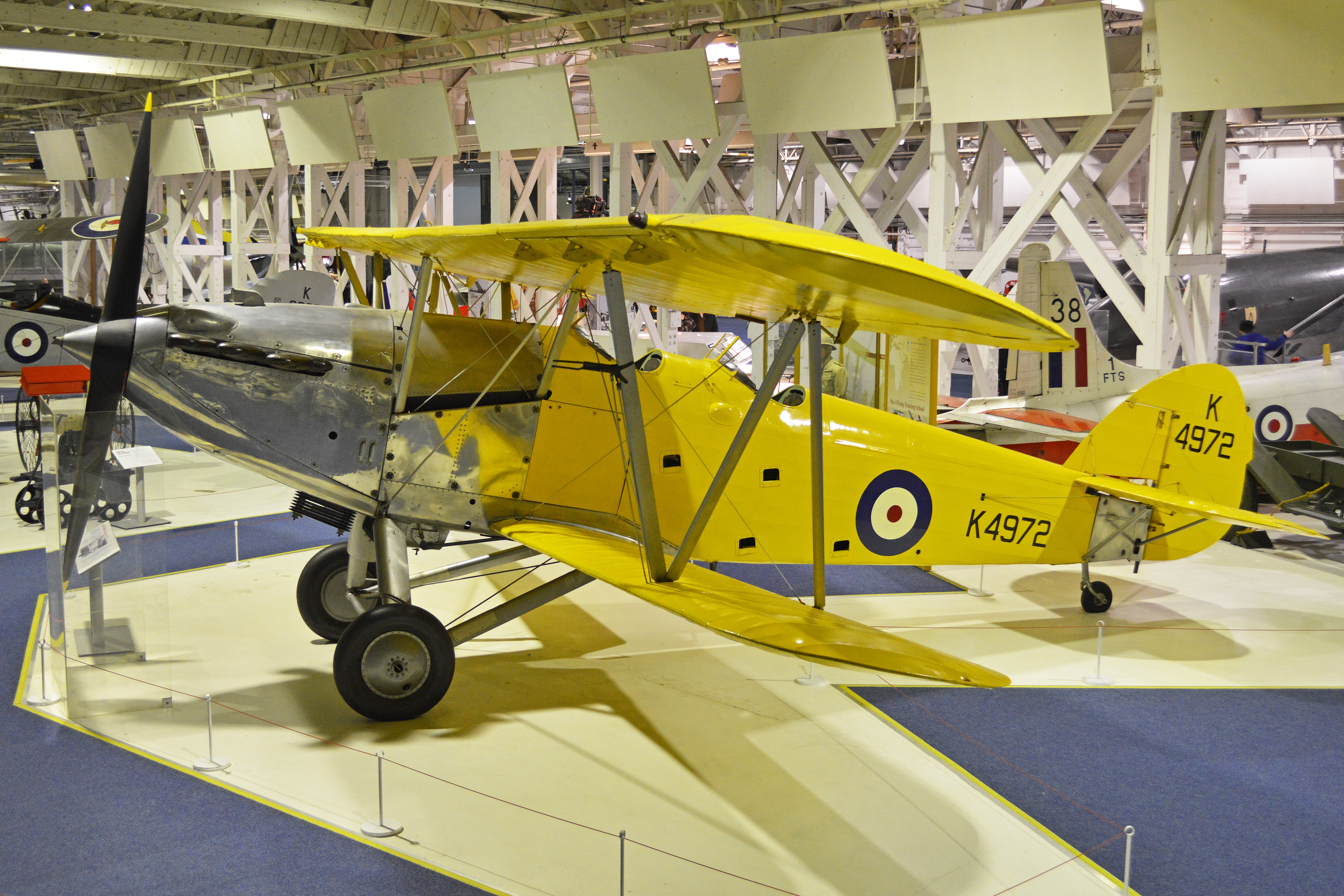
Hawker Hart

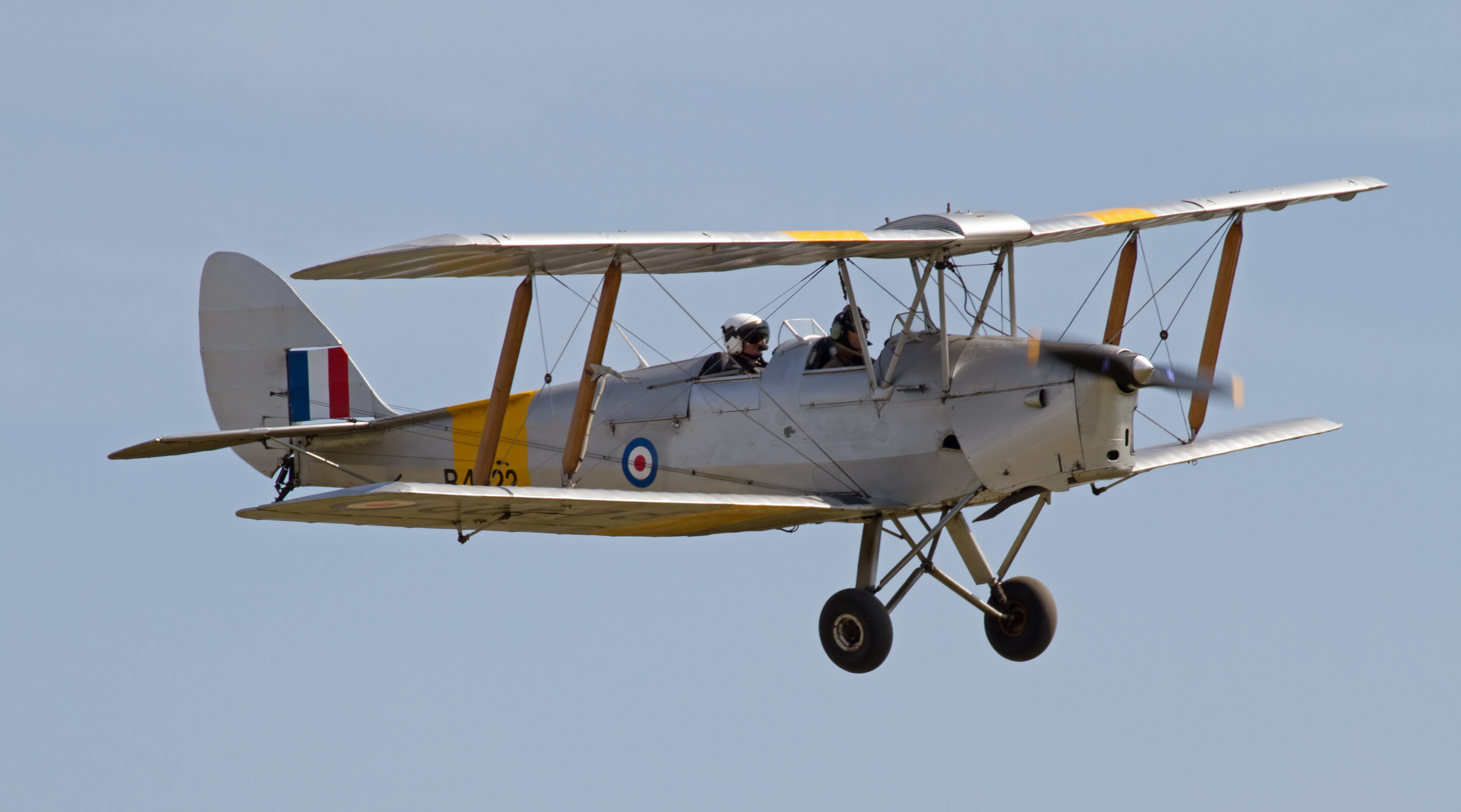
de Havilland Tiger Moth

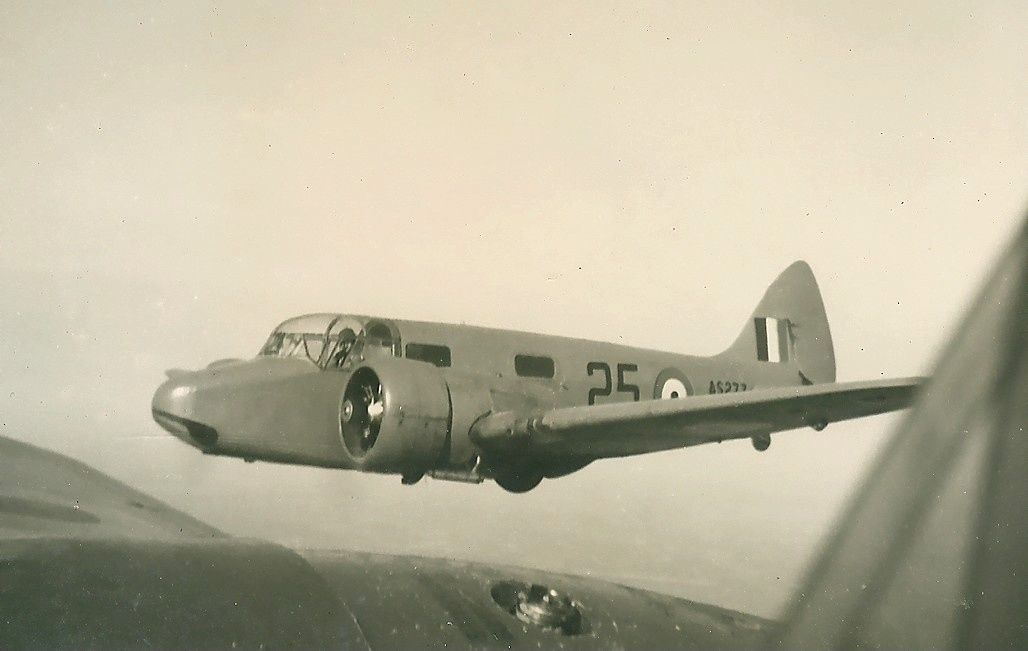
Airspeed Oxford

- Hawker Hart Trainer trainer aircraft (October 1939 - August 1942)
- Hawker Nimrod II carrier-based biplane fighter aircraft (October 1939 - June 1940)
- Hawker Osprey light bomber (October 1939 - February 1942)
- Miles Magister I trainer aircraft (October 1939 - May 1941)
- Fairey Seal spotter-reconnaissance biplane (1939)
- Blackburn Shark Mk II torpedo bomber (October 1939 - November 1941)
- Percival Vega Gull trainer and communications aircraft (1939 - July 1940)
- Fairey Swordfish I torpedo bomber (May 1940 - July 1943)
- Percival Proctor lA radio trainer/communications aircraft (May 1940 - September 1944)
- de Havilland Tiger Moth trainer aircraft (May 1940 - January 1945)
- Avro Tutor trainer aircraft (May 1940 - August 1942)
- de Havilland Gipsy Moth trainer aircraft (June - August 1940)
- Miles Master I advanced trainer aircraft (September 1940 - October 1943)
- Hawker Audax Hawker Hart variant (December 1941 - August 1942)
- Blackburn Skua dive bomber / fighter aircraft (April - September 1943)
- Fairey Fulmar Mk.I reconnaissance/fighter aircraft (June - October 1943)
- Fairey Swordfish II torpedo bomber (July 1943 - September 1944)
- Fairey Barracuda Mk Il torpedo and dive bomber (August - October 1943)
- Bristol Blenheim Mk.I light bomber (June - December 1943)
- North American Harvard III trainer aircraft (December 1943 - December 1944)
- Miles Master II advanced trainer aircraft (July - October 1944)
- Fairey Firefly I fighter and anti-submarine aircraft (March - December 1946)
- North American Harvard Ilb trainer aircraft (March 1946 - November 1949)
- North American Harvard III trainer aircraft (March - November 1946)
- Avro Lancaster B.I heavy bomber (March 1946 - January 1947)
- de Havilland Tiger Moth trainer aircraft (March - September 1946)
- Airspeed Oxford trainer aircraft (March 1946 - November 1949)
- Supermarine Seafire F Mk XV fighter aircraft (April - November 1946)
- de Havilland Mosquito FB Mk. VI multirole combat aircraft (September - December 1946)
- de Havilland Mosquito T Mk.III multirole combat aircraft (October - December 1946)
- Supermarine Seafire F Mk 45 fighter aircraft (November - December 1946)

== Naval air stations ==
780 Naval Air Squadron operated from a number of naval air stations of the Royal Navy, in the United Kingdom:

1939 - 1945

- Royal Naval Air Station Eastleigh (HMS Raven), Hampshire, (2 October 1939 - 7 October 1940)
- Royal Naval Air Station Lee-on-Solent (HMS Daedalus), Hampshire, (Detachments Hamble, Hampshire, 7 October 1940 - 9 October 1943)
- Royal Naval Air Station Charlton Horethorne (HMS Heron II), Somerset, (9 October 1943 - 28 November 1944)
- Royal Naval Air Station Lee-on-Solent (HMS Daedalus), Hampshire, (28 November 1944 - 2 January 1945)
- disbanded (2 January 1945)

1946 - 1949

- Royal Naval Air Station Hinstock (HMS Godwit), Shropshire, (satellite Royal Naval Air Station Peplow (HMS Godwit II)), Shropshire, (28 March 1946 - 17 December 1946)
- Royal Naval Air Station Crail (HMS Jackdaw), Fife, (17 December 1946 - 27 March 1947)
- Royal Naval Air Station Donibristle (HMS Merlin), Fife, (27 March 1947 - 27 May 1947)
- Royal Naval Air Station Culdrose (HMS Seahawk), Cornwall, (27 May 1947 - 16 November 1949)
- disbanded - (16 November 1949)

== Commanding officers ==
List of commanding officers of 780 Naval Air Squadron, with date of appointment:

1939 - 1945

- Lieutenant Commander H.S. Cooper, RN, from 2 October 1939
- Lieutenant Commander(A) J. Goodyear, RNVR, from 7 October 1940
- Lieutenant Commander(A) T.G. Stubley, RNVR, from 17 August 1942
- disbanded - 2 January 1945

1946 - 1949

- Lieutenant Commander D.C.E.F. Gibson, DSC, RN, from 28 March 1946
- Lieutenant(A) W.E. Cotton, RN, from 17 December 1946
- Lieutenant S.P. Luke, RN, from 2 October 1947
- Lieutenant Commander G.R. Humphries, RN, from 5 January 1948
- Lieutenant(A) R.B. Lunberg, RN, from 16 November 1948
- Lieutenant(A) M.A. Birrell, RN, from 31 March 1949
- disbanded - 16 November 1949

Note: Abbreviation (A) signifies Air Branch of the RN or RNVR.
