= 758 Naval Air Squadron =

Inactive flying squadron of the Royal Navy's Fleet Air Arm

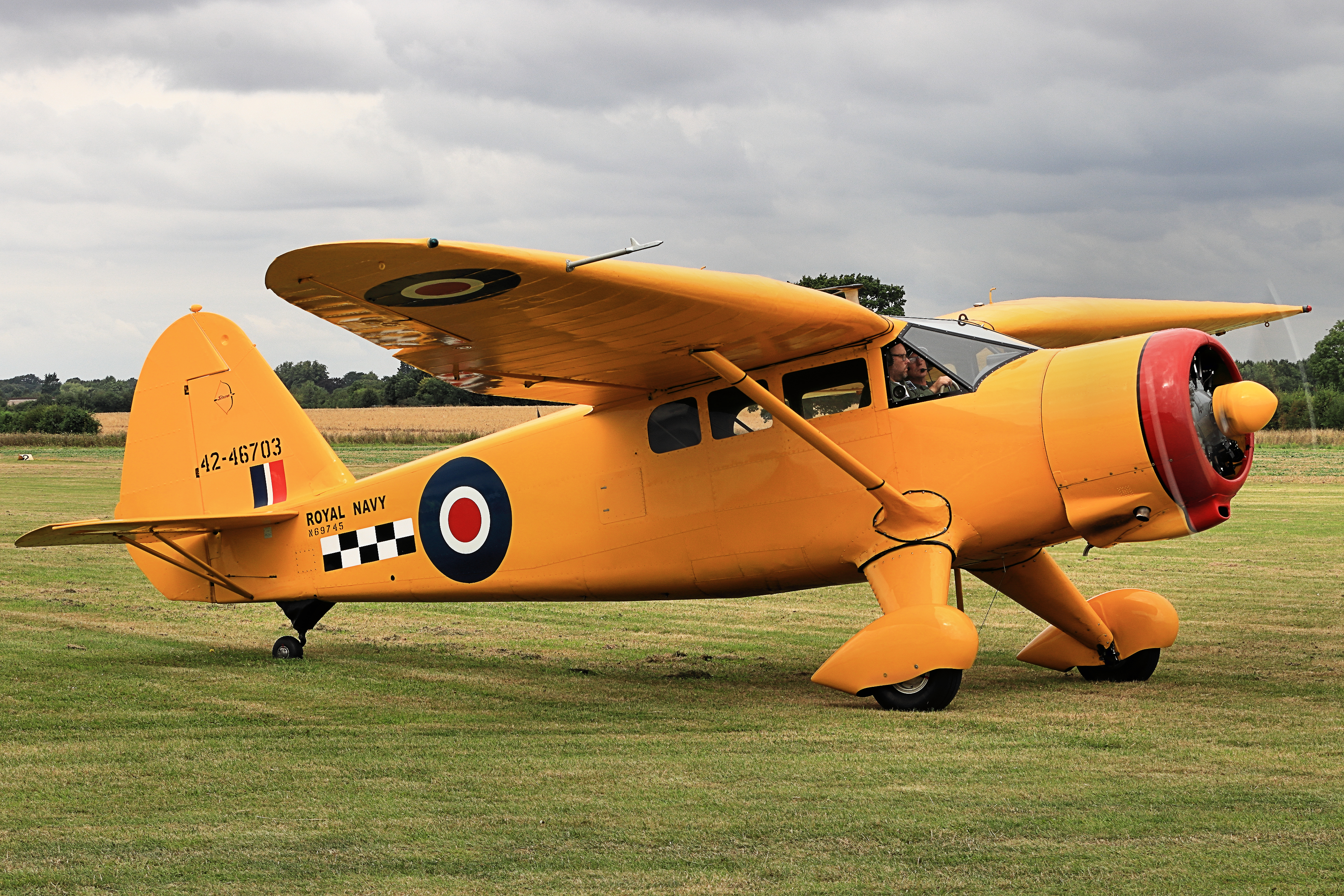
- Stinson Reliant; of the type used by 758 NAS
- Active: 1939–1941; 1942–1946
- Disbanded: 14 May 1946
- Country: United Kingdom
- Branch: Royal Navy
- Type: Fleet Air Arm Second Line Squadron
- Role: Telegraphist Air Gunner Training Squadron; Naval Advanced Instrument Flying Training Unit
- Size: Squadron
- Part of: Fleet Air Arm
- Home station: See Naval air stations section for full list.
- Aircraft: See Aircraft operated section for full list.

Commanders
- Notable commanders: Rear Admiral Sir Donald C.E.F. Gibson, KCB, DSC, RN

Insignia
- Identification Markings: X5A+ (1939 - 1941); U1A+, U3A+, U1AA, U1BB+, U3AA+ & U3BB+

758 Naval Air Squadron (758 NAS), also called 758 Squadron, is an inactive Fleet Air Arm (FAA) naval air squadron of the United Kingdom's Royal Navy (RN). It was last active as the Naval Advanced Instrument Flying School based at RNAS Hinstock (HMS Godwit), Shropshire and provided instrument courses, utilising a large number of Airspeed Oxford aircraft.

The squadron had reformed at RNAS Donibristle (HMS Merlin), Fife, in 1942, as a Beam Approach School before moving to RNAS Hinstock. There detachments were sent to the specialised flying schools at RNAS Crail (HMS Jackdaw), RNAS East Haven (HMS Peewit), RNAS Fearn (HMS Owl) and RNAS Yeovilton (HMS Heron). 'X' and 'Y' Rover Flights supplemented the detachments, 'Z' Flight was on calibration work and evolving homing and landing capabilities, with the squadron disbanding in 1946, at RNAS Peplow (HMS Godwit II), into 780 Naval Air Squadron.

The squadron had initially formed as a Telegraphist Air Gunner Training Squadron, from 1939 and 1941, renumbered from 759 Naval Air Squadron, operating out of RNAS Eastleigh (HMS Raven), Hampshire. It moved to RNAS Arbroath (HMS Condor), Angus, in 1940, disbanding there the following year.

== History ==
=== Telegraphist Air Gunner Training Squadron (1939-1941) ===
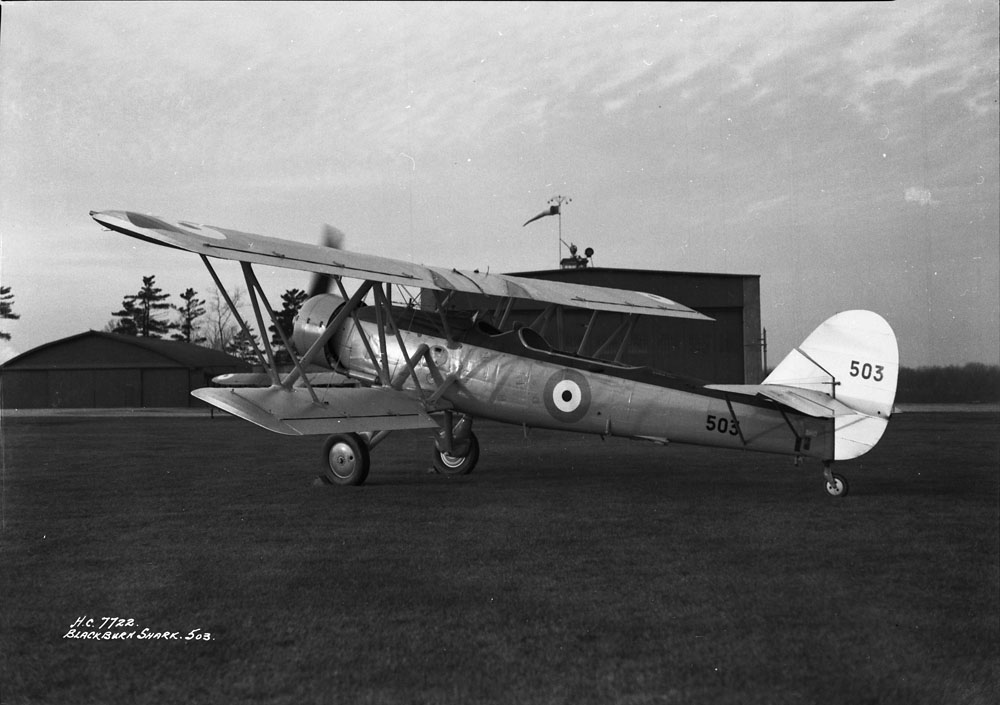
Blackburn Shark; an example of the type used by 758 NAS.

758 Naval Air Squadron formed at RNAS Eastleigh (HMS Raven), in Hampshire, on 1 July 1939, as a Telegraphist Air Gunner Training Squadron, re-numbered from 759 Naval Air Squadron and as part of No.2 Air Gunners School. It operated with Blackburn Shark II, a carrier-borne torpedo bomber, Hawker Osprey III, a navalised carrier-borne version of the Hawker Hart, used in the fighter and reconnaissance roles and Percival Proctor Ia and IIa, a radio trainer and communications aircraft.

The squadron continued Telegraphist Air Gunner training at RNAS Eastleigh throughout the following fifteen months, before moving to RNAS Arbroath (HMS Condor), East Angus, Scotland, on 14 October 1940. Here, the squadron kept its Percival Proctor and acquired Blackburn Roc, a naval turret fighter aircraft and Blackburn Skua, a British carrier-borne dive bomber and fighter aircraft, leaving the Hawker Osprey and Blackburn Shark behind and continuing the TAG training for a further four months, before disbanding on 1 February 1941.

=== Naval Advanced Instrument Flying Training Unit (1942-1946) ===
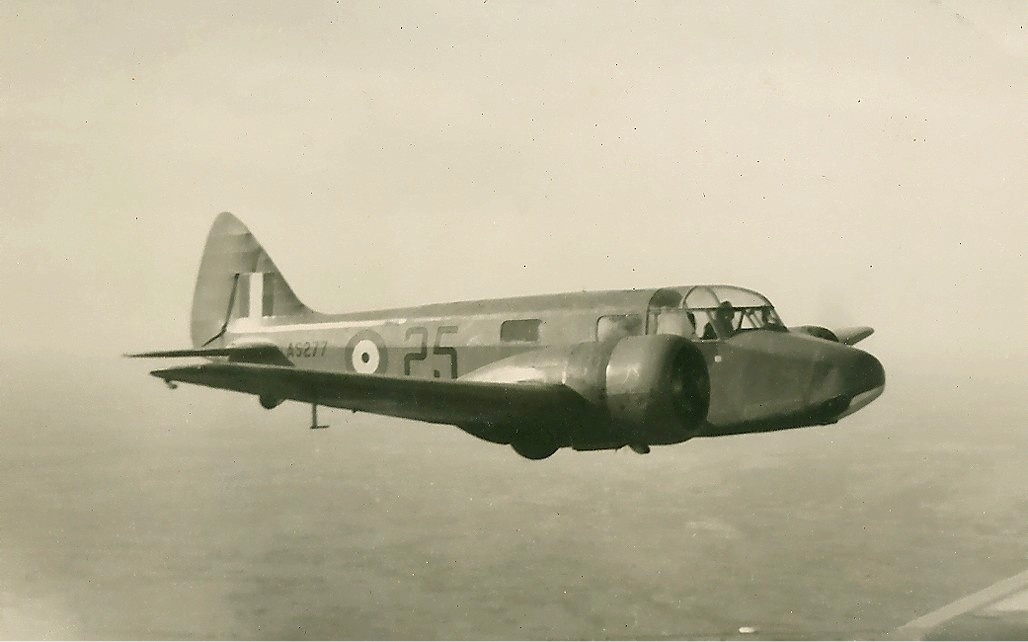
Airspeed Oxford II; an example of the type used by 758 NAS.

758 Naval Air Squadron reformed at RNAS Donibristle (HMS Merlin), near Dunfermline, in Fife, on 25 May 1942. Operating Airspeed Oxford, a twin-engine training aircraft, the squadron remained at RNAS Donibristle for around three months, moving to RNAS Hinstock (HMS Godwit), in Shropshire, on 15 August 1942.

It was initially known as the Beam Approach School, then later known as the Blind Approach School. In 1943 it was titled Naval Advanced Instrument Flying School and as well as Airspeed Oxford aircraft, the squadron also operated Avro Anson, a multi-role training aircraft, Stinson Reliant, a liaison and training aircraft, de Havilland Tiger Moth, a trainer aircraft and Vickers Wellington, a twin-engined long-range medium bomber aircraft. Later in the year North American Harvard, an American advanced trainer aircraft replaced the Vickers Wellington aircraft and by 1944, 758 Naval Air Squadron had over one-hundred aircraft.

Detachments went to RNAS Crail (HMS Jackdaw), RNAS East Haven (HMS Peewit), RNAS Fearn (HMS Owl) and RNAS Yeovilton (HMS Heron), which housed the Specialised Flying Schools, to supply instrument training courses. The detachments work was reinforced by X and Y Rover Flights, while Z Flight, a calibration flight, also worked on enhancing homing and landing assistance.

The relief landing grounds, at RNAS Weston Park (HMS Godwit II), situated in the grounds of Weston Park, a country house in Weston-under-Lizard, Staffordshire, and RAF Bratton, located at Bratton, Shropshire, were used by 758 Naval Air Squadron for Instrument Flying Training, until RNAS Hinstock gained RNAS Peplow as a satellite airfield and from 28 February 1945 the squadron then operated from RNAS Peplow (HMS Godwit II), situated just outside Peplow in Shropshire.

On the 18 March 1946 the squadron absorbed part of 798 Naval Air Squadron, however, 758 Naval Air Squadron disbanded on 14 May 1946 at RNAS Peplow, becoming 'B' Flight of 780 Naval Air Squadron.

== Aircraft operated ==
The squadron has operated a number of different aircraft types, including:

- Hawker Osprey III fighter and reconnaissance aircraft (July 1939 - June 1940)
- Blackburn Shark Mk II torpedo-spotter-reconnaissance aircraft (July 1939 - September 1940)
- Blackburn Skua Mk.II dive bomber and fighter aircraft (October 1939 - February 1941)
- Blackburn Roc Mk.I fighter aircraft (November 1939 - 1940)
- Percival Proctor IA deck landing and radio trainer (December 1939 - February 1941)
- Percival Proctor IIA radio trainer (August 1940)
- Airspeed Oxford training aircraft (May 1942 - May 1946)
- de Havilland Tiger Moth trainer aircraft (February 1943 - September 1945)
- Vickers Wellington GR Mark XI reconnaissance aircraft (September 1943 - December 1943)
- Stinson Reliant I liaison and training aircraft (November 1943 - June 1945)
- Avro Anson Mk I multi-role trainer aircraft (November 1943 - November 1945)
- North American Harvard III advanced trainer aircraft (November 1944 - May 1946)
- North American Harvard IIB advanced trainer aircraft (March 1945 - May 1946)

== Naval air stations ==
758 Naval Air Squadron operated from a number of naval air stations of the Royal Navy, in Scotland and England:

1939 - 1941

- Royal Naval Air Station Eastleigh (HMS Raven), Hampshire, (1 July 1939 - 14 October 1940)
- Royal Naval Air Station Arbroath (HMS Condor), Angus, (14 October 1940 - 1 February 1941)
- disbanded - (1 February 1941)

1942 - 1946

- Royal Naval Air Station Donibristle (HMS Merlin), Fife, (25 May 1942 - 15 August 1942)
- Royal Naval Air Station Hinstock (HMS Godwit), Shropshire, (15 August 1942 - 28 February 1945)
  - Relief Landing Ground Royal Air Force Bratton, Shropshire
  - satellite Royal Naval Air Station Peplow (HMS Godwit II), Shropshire, (28 February 1945 - 14 May 1946)
- disbanded - (14 May 1946)

== Commanding officers ==
List of commanding officers of 758 Naval Air Squadron, with date of appointment:

1939 - 1941

- Lieutenant Commander W.H.G. Saunt, RN, from 10 July 1939
- Lieutenant Commander J.M. Wintour, RN, from 22 May 1940
- Lieutenant Commander(A) F. Leach, RNVR, from 26 October 1940
- disbanded - 1 February 1941

1942 - 1946

- Lieutenant Commander J.B.W. Pugh, AFC, RNVR, from 25 May 1942
- Lieutenant Commander(A) J.C.V.K. Watson, RNVR, from 15 August 1942 (KiFA - 1 January 1944)
- separate flights, from 1 January 1944
- disbanded - 15 May 1946

=== 758A Flight ===
List of commanding officers of A Flight, 758 Naval Air Squadron, with date of appointment:

- Lieutenant Commander(A) J.MacD. Scott, OBE, RN, from 13 December 1943
- Lieutenant Commander D.C.E.F. Gibson, DSC, RN, from 4 April 1946
- disbanded - 15 May 1946

=== 758B Flight ===
List of commanding officers of B Flight, 758 Naval Air Squadron, with date of appointment:

- Lieutenant Commander(A) H.R. Law, RNVR, from 13 December 1943
- Lieutenant Commander(A) G.T. Bertholdt, RNVR, from 1 January 1945
- Lieutenant Commander(A) F.G. Averill, RNVR, from June 1945
- Lieutenant Commander(A) G.B. O'Flynn, RNVR, from 27 July 1945
- Lieutenant Commander(A) R.T. Hargreaves, RNVR, from 8 February 1946
- disbanded - 15 May 1946

=== 758C Flight ===
List of commanding officers of C Flight, 758 Naval Air Squadron, with date of appointment:

- Lieutenant Commander(A) G.K. Pridham, RNVR, from 13 December 1943
- Lieutenant Commander(A) T. McVey, RN, from 28 July 1944
- Lieutenant Commander(A) E.S. Barsham, RNVR, from 8 November 1944
- disbanded - 17 February 1946

=== 758D Flight ===
Commanding officer of D Flight, 758 Naval Air Squadron, with date of appointment:

- Lieutenant Commander(A) O.P. Bradley, RNVR, from 27 February 1945
- disbanded - 7 February 1946

=== 758 Rover Flight ===
List of commanding officers of Rover Flight, 758 Naval Air Squadron, with date of appointment:

- Lieutenant Commander(A) R.T. Hargreaves, RNVR, from 17 July 1944
- Lieutenant Commander(A) H.R. Law, RNVR, from 10 October 1944
- disbanded - 6 May 1946

Note: Abbreviation (A) signifies Air Branch of the RN or RNVR.
