= 729 Naval Air Squadron =

Inactive flying squadron of the Royal Navy's Fleet Air Arm

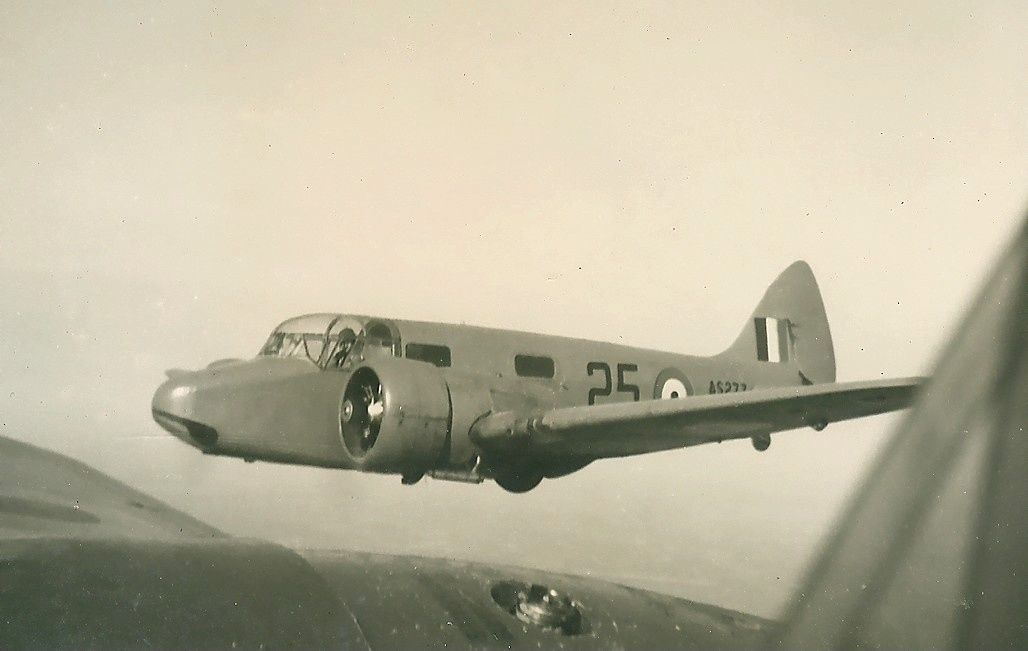
- Airspeed Oxford, an example of the type used by 729 NAS
- Active: 1945–1946
- Disbanded: 24 July 1946
- Country: United Kingdom
- Branch: Royal Navy
- Type: Fleet Air Arm Second Line Squadron
- Role: Instrument Flying Training squadron
- Size: Squadron
- Part of: Fleet Air Arm
- Home station: See Naval air stations section for full list.

Insignia
- Identification Markings: K7A+

Aircraft flown
- Patrol: Supermarine Sea Otter
- Trainer: de Havilland Tiger Moth; North American Harvard; Airspeed Oxford

729 Naval Air Squadron (729 NAS) was a Fleet Air Arm (FAA) naval air squadron of the United Kingdom's Royal Navy (RN). It was active between 1945 and 1946 as an Instrument Flying Training Squadron, for service in the far east. It formed at HMS Godwit, RNAS Hinstock, Shropshire, England, as an offshoot of 758 Naval Air Squadron on New Year's Day 1945. It didn't began operations until mid-may at HMS Garuda, RNARY Combatore, Tamil Nadu, India. The following month the squadron moved to HMS Valluru, RNAS Tambaram, Tamil Nadu and this was followed in July with a move to HMS Rajaliya, RNAS Puttalam in Ceylon in then in late August setting at HMS Ukussa, RNAS Katukurunda, where it remained for almost twelve months before disbanding.

== History ==
=== Instrument Flying Training (1945–1946) ===
729 Naval Air Squadron formed on 1 January 1945 at RNAS Hinstock (HMS Godwit), in Shropshire, as an Instrument Flying Training squadron and as an offshoot of 758 Naval Air Squadron, the Royal Naval Advanced Instrument Flying Training Unit, for service in the Far East. It made use of 758 Naval Air Squadron's North American Harvard single-engine advanced trainer aircraft and Airspeed Oxford, a twin-engine monoplane trainer aircraft, enabling working up while based on the United Kingdom. The squadron personnel took passage for India on 16 April 1945, without aircraft.

On 15 May 1945, personnel from 729 Naval Air Squadron arrived at Royal Navy Aircraft Repair Yard Coimbatore (HMS Garuda) in Southern India. They spent three weeks working up, ready to continue Instrument Flying training, utilising four Airspeed Oxford and a single North American Harvard which was issued on arrival.

On 7 June 1945, the squadron relocated approximately 275 miles (443 km) north-east to Royal Navy Aircraft Maintenance Yard Tambaram (HMS Valluru), however, the squadron very shortly later, moved again and on 10 July 1945 it relocated to RNAS Puttalam (HMS Rajaliya), in Ceylon (Sri Lanka).

Japan surrendered on 15 August 1945 and due to the end of the Second World War, the need for pilots was reduced and the squadron's role was reassessed. On 30 August 1945 729 Naval Air Squadron relocated to RNAS Katukurunda (HMS Ukussa), remaining in Ceylon. In the new year of 1946 two Supermarine Sea Otter, an amphibious aircraft type, were added to the squadron. These were from ‘B’ Flight of 1700 Naval Air Squadron, which undertook Air-sea rescue sorties, however, this was withdrawn in April 1946.

On 24 July 1946, at RNAS Katukurunda (HMS Ukussa), 729 Naval Air Squadron disbanded.

== Aircraft flown ==
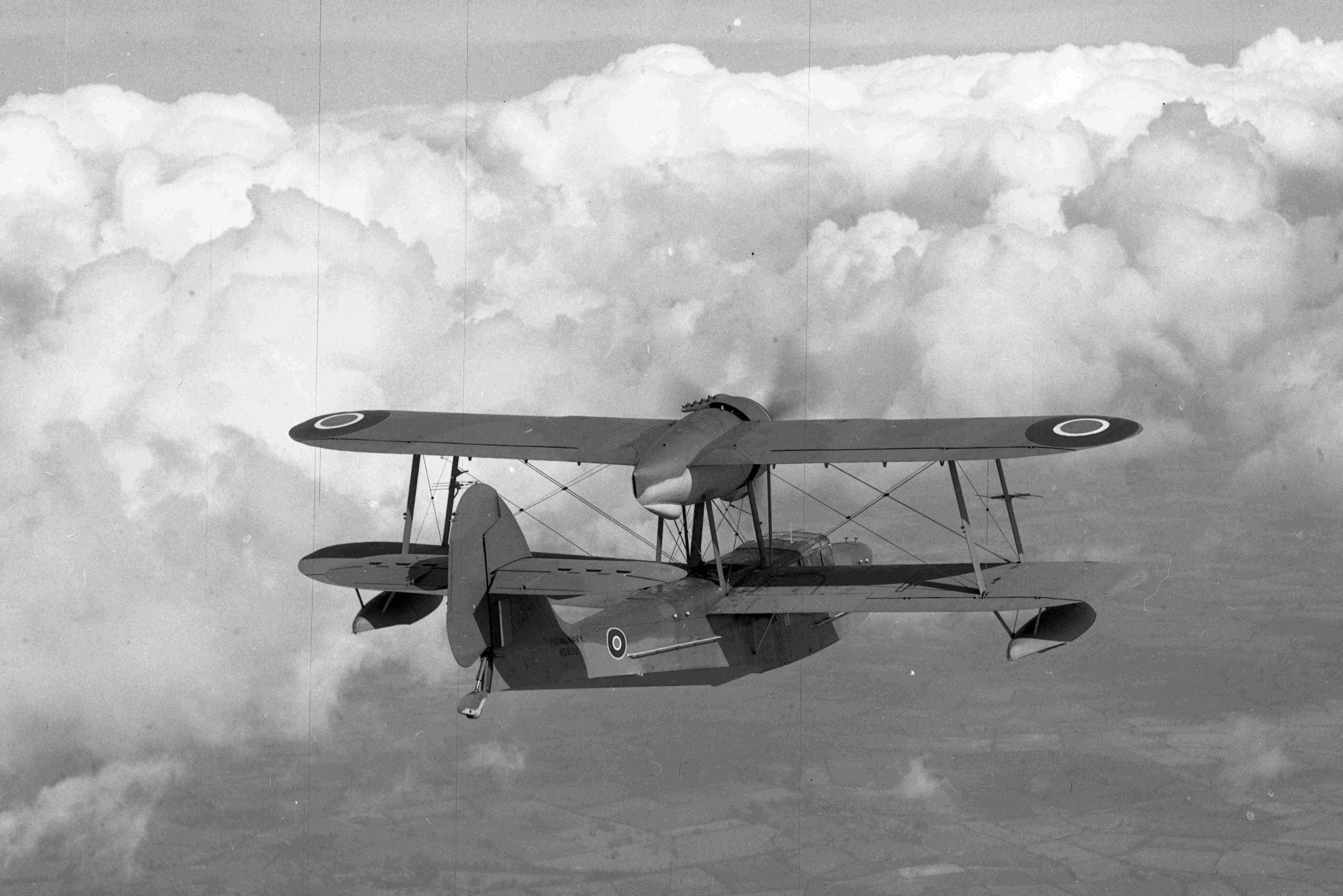
Supermarine Sea Otter ASR Mk.II RD892

Between 1945 and 1946, 729 Naval Air Squadron flew a number of different aircraft types, including:

- North American Harvard advanced training aircraft (May 1945-July 1946)
- Airspeed Oxford training aircraft (May 1945-July 1946)
- Supermarine Sea Otter amphibious air-sea rescue (January 1946-April 1946)
- de Havilland Tiger Moth trainer aircraft (March 1946 - June 1946)

== Naval air stations ==
729 Naval Air Squadron operated from a number of naval air stations of the Royal Navy, in England and overseas in India and Sri Lanka:

- Royal Naval Air Station Hinstock (HMS Godwit), Shropshire, (1 January 1945 - 16 April 1945)
- -transit- (16 April 1945 - 15 May 1945)
- Royal Naval Aircraft Repair Yard Coimbatore (HMS Garuda), India, (15 May 1945 - 7 June 1945)
- Royal Naval Aircraft Maintenance Yard Tambaram (HMS Valluru), India, (7 June 1945 - 20 July 1945)
- Royal Naval Air Station Puttalam (HMS Rajaliya), Ceylon, (20 July 1945 - 30 August 1945)
- Royal Naval Air Station Katukurunda (HMS Ukussa), Ceylon, (30 August 1945 - 24 July 1946)
- disbanded - (24 July 1946)

== Commanding officers ==
List of commanding officers of 729 Naval Air Squadron with date of appointment:

- Lieutenant Commander(A) H.R. Law, RNVR, from 1 January 1945
- Lieutenant(A) A.H. Bender, RNVR, from 23 November 1945
- disbanded - 24 July 1946

Note: Abbreviation (A) signifies Air Branch of the RN or RNVR.
