= RAF Bratton =

Former RAF base in Shropshire, England

RAF Bratton
- Bratton Aerodrome
- Bratton, near Wellington, Shropshire in England

Site information
- Owner: Air Ministry
- Operator: Royal Air Force; Royal Navy
- Controlled by: RAF Flying Training Command; Fleet Air Arm
- Condition: Disused

Location
- Shown within Shropshire
- Coordinates: 52°43′48″N 2°32′28″W

Site history
- Built: 1940
- In use: 1940-1945
- Fate: Farmland

Airfield information
- Elevation: 191 feet (58 m) AMSL
Runways
Direction	Length and surface
NE/SW	900 yards (823 m) Grass

Royal Air Force Bratton, or more simply RAF Bratton, is a former Royal Air Force station located at Bratton, around 2 miles (3 km) northeast of the town of Wellington and 8 miles (13 km) east of the town of Shrewsbury, Shropshire, England. .

Originally serving as a Satellite Landing Ground for RAF Shawbury, it subsequently transitioned to a satellite for RAF Tern Hill. In April 1944, the Admiralty was permitted to utilise the station as a satellite for RNAS Hinstock and did so until February 1945.

== History ==
The airfield opened in October 1940 as a grass Satellite Landing Ground for RAF Shawbury, later becoming a satellite for RAF Tern Hill in January 1944. It was a small site with limited facilities, including five Blister hangars and concrete hardstands. In April 1944 the Admiralty was granted use of the station, and it subsequently supported aircraft from 758 Naval Air Squadron, the Naval Advanced Instrument Flying Training Squadron based at RNAS Hinstock. The squadron had moved to Hinstock from RNAS Donibristle on 15 August 1942, initially as the Beam Approach School, later renamed the Blind Approach School and, by April 1943, the Naval Advanced Instrument Flying School.

The unit originally operated Airspeed Oxfords, with Avro Anson, Stinson Reliant, de Havilland Tiger Moth and Vickers Wellington XI aircraft added during 1943; the Vickers Wellingtons were withdrawn by the end of that year, and North American Harvard IIb and later Harvard III aircraft were introduced. By 1944 the squadron had expanded to more than 100 aircraft, predominantly Airspeed Oxfords, with smaller numbers of other types. The station’s role as a satellite ended in February 1945 when RAF Peplow was transferred to the Admiralty as a satellite for RNAS Hinstock. RAF Bratton closed by July 1945.

== Units ==
The following units were here at some point:

- No. 5 (Pilots) Advanced Flying Unit RAF
- No. 11 (Pilots) Advanced Flying Unit RAF
- No. 11 Service Flying Training School RAF
- No. 21 (Pilots) Advanced Flying Unit RAF

== Current use ==
The site is used as farmland.
