= Duncan Lewin =

Royal Navy aviator (1912–1983)

Captain Duncan Lewin CB CBE DSO DSC*
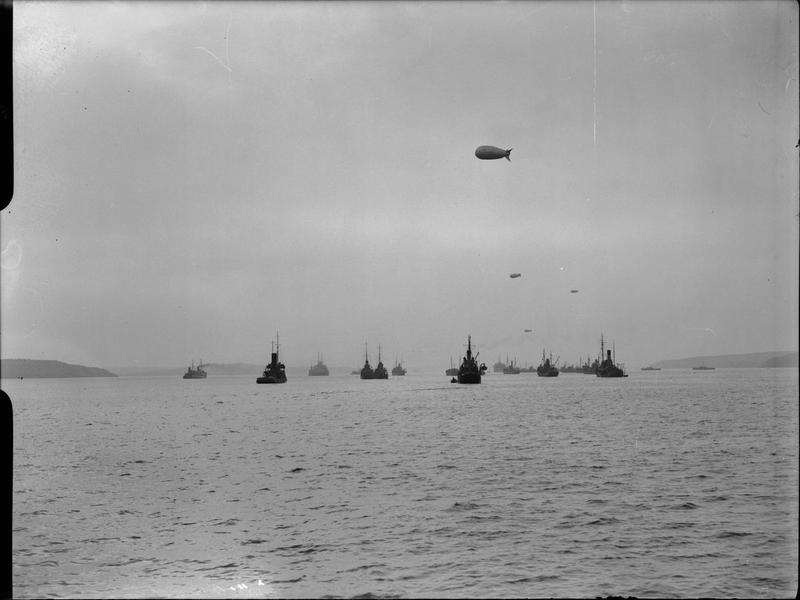
- Born: Edgar Duncan Goodenough Lewin; 9 August 1912; Farnham, Surrey, England
- Died: 24 November 1983 (aged 71); Luton, Bedfordshire, England
- Military career
- Allegiance: United Kingdom
- Branch: Royal Navy
- Service years: 1950
- Rank: Captain
- Commands: 759 Naval Air Squadron; 808 Naval Air Squadron; HMS Glory; HMS Eagle
- Awards: Companion of the Order of the Bath; Commander of the Order of the British Empire; Distinguished Service Order; Distinguished Service Cross and bar

Edgar Duncan Goodenough Lewin CB, CBE, DSO, DSC & Bar (9 August 1912 – 24 November 1983) was an officer of the Royal Navy during the Second World War and the Korean War. A naval aviator, he was involved in the Battle of the River Plate and carried out attacks on the German battleship Tirpitz. He also commanded aircraft carriers during the Korean War.

Lewin was born in Farnham, Surrey on 9 August 1912. Lewin, a pilot on HMS Ajax during the Battle of the River Plate where he reported on the movements of the Graf Spee. He was awarded the Distinguished Service Cross. He took part in attacks on the German battleship Tirpitz before moving to the Far East later in the war.

He was the commander of the aircraft carrier HMS Glory (during the Korean War). He also commanded HMS Eagle before becoming Director of Plans at the Admiralty, and then retiring from the Navy in 1957.

He became managing director of Blackburn Aircraft Limited between 1971 and 1977 before moving to Hawker Siddeley as a sales director.

== Honours and awards ==
- 25 November 1941 - Lieutenant Edgar Duncan Goodenough Lewin, DSC, Royal Navy, HMS Ark Royal is appointed a companion of the Distinguished Service Order for courage and resolution in Mediterranean waters.
- 10 November 1953 - Captain Edgar Duncan Goodenough Lewin, DSO, DSC, Royal Navy, HMS Glory is appointed a Commander of the Order of the British Empire for distinguished service in operation in Korean waters.
- 1 January 1958 - Captain Edgar Duncan Goodenough Lewin, CBE, DSO, DSC, is appointed a companion of the Order of the Bath.
