= RNAS Hinstock =

Former Royal Naval Air Station in Shropshire, England

RNAS Hinstock HMS Godwit RAF Ollerton No. 21 Satellite Landing Ground
- Hinstock, Shropshire in England
- HMS Godwit

Site information
- Type: Royal Naval Air Station
- Owner: Admiralty; Air Ministry
- Operator: Royal Navy; Royal Air Force
- Controlled by: Fleet Air Arm; RAF Maintenance Command
- Condition: Disused

Location
- Shown within Shropshire RNAS Hinstock (the United Kingdom)
- Coordinates: 52°49′59″N 2°30′19″W

Site history
- Built: 1941
- In use: 1941-1942 (Royal Air Force); 1942-1947 (Fleet Air Arm)
- Fate: Farmland / Industry
- Battles/wars: European theatre of World War II

Garrison information
- Garrison: Fleet Air Arm
- Occupants: Central Naval Instrument Flying Training School

Airfield information
- Elevation: 80 metres (262 ft) AMSL
Runways
| Direction | Length and surface |
|---|---|
| 04/22 | 1,280 metres (4,199 ft) x 46 metres (151 ft) Heavy Steel Track |

Royal Naval Air Station Hinstock, or more commonly known as RNAS Hinstock; (commissioned HMS Godwit) is a former Royal Navy, Naval Air Station, located 4 miles (6 km) South West of Market Drayton in Shropshire, England. It was operational between 1941 and 1947, being used by both the Royal Air Force (1941-1942) and the Royal Navy (1942–1947).

The airfield lies 1.75 miles (3 km) West of the village of Hinstock in Shropshire. Stoke on Trent lies 13 miles (21 km) North East and Shrewsbury 11.5 miles (19 km) South West. Birmingham lies 30 miles (48 km) South East.

The airfield opened as RAF Ollerton in 1941 as No. 21 Satellite Landing Ground, as an emergency landing ground for RAF Tern Hill. It was utilised by RAF Maintenance Units and also used as a satellite landing ground for RAF Burtonwood and RAF Shawbury. It was then transferred to the Admiralty who used it from 1942 until 1947, home to a small number of Naval Air Squadrons, known as the Central Naval Instrument Flying Training School, specialising in instrument and blind approach flying training and operating a variety of aircraft. The airfield was closed in February 1947.

== History ==
=== Royal Air Force (1941 - 1942) ===
The airfield was used by the Royal Air Force during the early years of the Second World War. Initially it was opened to No. 37 MU from RAF Burtonwood, as No. 21 Satellite Landing Ground (SLG) called RAF Ollerton. This followed by No. 27 MU from RAF Shawbury and at some point No. 29 MU from RAF High Ercall. During this initial phase it was a grass airfield.

The following Royal Air Force Maintenance units were stationed here:

- No. 27 Maintenance Unit RAF
- No. 29 Maintenance Unit RAF
- No. 37 Maintenance Unit RAF

=== Royal Navy (1942 - 1947) ===
RAF Ollerton was transferred from the Royal Air Force to the Royal Navy on 13 August 1942. It was initially called Royal Naval Air Station Ollerton, School for Instruction in Blind Approach and Instrument Flying, but was later renamed to Royal Naval Air Station Hinstock. Upon the admiralty taking control, it was used initially as a satellite airfield for RNAS Stretton (HMS Blackcap).

It was commissioned on 14 June 1943 as an independent command bearing the ship's name Godwit, with accounts carried in HMS Blackcap. Commander RNVR (P) J. B. W. Pugh, OBE, AFC, was the appointed commanding officer. In July 1943 the runway was rebuilt using heavy steel track. On 1 April 1944 RNAS Hinstock was commissioned as HMS Godwit. Its role was as a training station for the Central Naval Instrument Flying Training School. In connection with the training school it had temporary use of two satellite airfields: RAF Weston Park and RAF Bratton.

The accommodation consisted the Officers quarters at Hinstock Hall, 1.75 miles (2.82 km) east, Ratings quarters at Childs Ercall, 0.5 miles (0.80 km) south, and WRNS quarters at Steppes farm, Childs Ercall. The available capacity was for 130 Officers, 363 Chiefs, P.O.s and ratings, 7 WRNS Officers and 144 WRNS Chiefs, P.O.s and ratings.

== Royal Navy operational history ==
=== Central Naval Instrument Flying Training School ===
The first Fleet Air Arm squadron to move into RNAS Hinstock was 758 Naval Air Squadron, on the 15 August 1942. It was initially known as the Beam Approach School, then later changed to the Blind Approach School. In 1943 it was then titled Naval Advanced Instrument Flying School and as well as Airspeed Oxford, a British twin-engine training aircraft, the squadron also operated Avro Anson, a British twin-engine, multi-role aircraft, Stinson Reliant an American liaison and training aircraft, de Havilland Tiger Moth, a 1930s British trainer biplane and Vickers Wellington, a British twin-engined, long-range medium bomber aircraft. Later in the year North American Harvard, an American single-engined advanced trainer aircraft, replaced the Vickers Wellington, and by 1944, 758 NAS had over 100 aircraft.

The relief landing grounds, at RNAS Weston Park (HMS Godwit II) and RAF Bratton, were used by 758 NAS for instrument flying training, until RNAS Hinstock gained RAF Peplow as a satellite airfield and then from 28 February 1945 and the squadron then operated from RNAS Peplow (HMS Godwit II). On the 18 March 1946 the squadron absorbed part of 798 Naval Air Squadron, however, 758 NAS disbanded on the 14 May 1946 at RNAS Peplow, becoming 'B' Flight of 780 Naval Air Squadron.

729 Naval Air Squadron formed on 1 January 1945 at RNAS Hinstock as an Instrument Flying Training squadron, as an offshoot of 758 NAS, the Royal Naval Advanced Instrument Flying Training Unit, for service in the Far East. It made use of 758 NAS's North American Harvard and Airspeed Oxford aircraft, enabling working up while based on the UK. The squadron personnel took passage for India on 16 April 1945, without aircraft.

On the 1 June 1945 702 Naval Air Squadron reformed as an offshoot of 758 NAS, equipped with Airspeed Oxford and North American Harvard aircraft, as an Instrument Flying Training & Checking Squadron. Seven weeks later the squadron personnel took passage to RNAS Schofields in Australia.

780 Naval Air Squadron

=== Engine Handling Unit ===
734 Naval Air Squadron, an Engine Handling Unit, which used modified, ex-Royal Air Force Armstrong Whitworth Whitley Mk VII aircraft to train aircrew, moved from RNAS Worthy Down (HMS Kestrel) to RNAS Hinstock, on the 21 August 1945, however, it operated out of RNAS Hinstock's satellite airfield, RNAS Peplow (HMS Godwit II), also located in Shropshire. This was a former Royal Air Force bomber air base, with long runways, that could easily accommodate the Whitley. The squadron disbanded on 21 February 1946.

=== Advanced Single Engine Conversion & Refresher Flying Training Unit ===
798 Naval Air Squadron was an Advanced Single Engine Conversion & Refresher Flying Training Unit which moved to RNAS Hinstock from RNAS Halesworth on 28 November 1945, equipped with Fairey Barracuda, Fairey Firefly, North American Harvard, Supermarine Seafire and de Havilland Tiger Moth aircraft. The squadron disbanded at RNAS Hinstock on 18 March 1946.

== Today ==
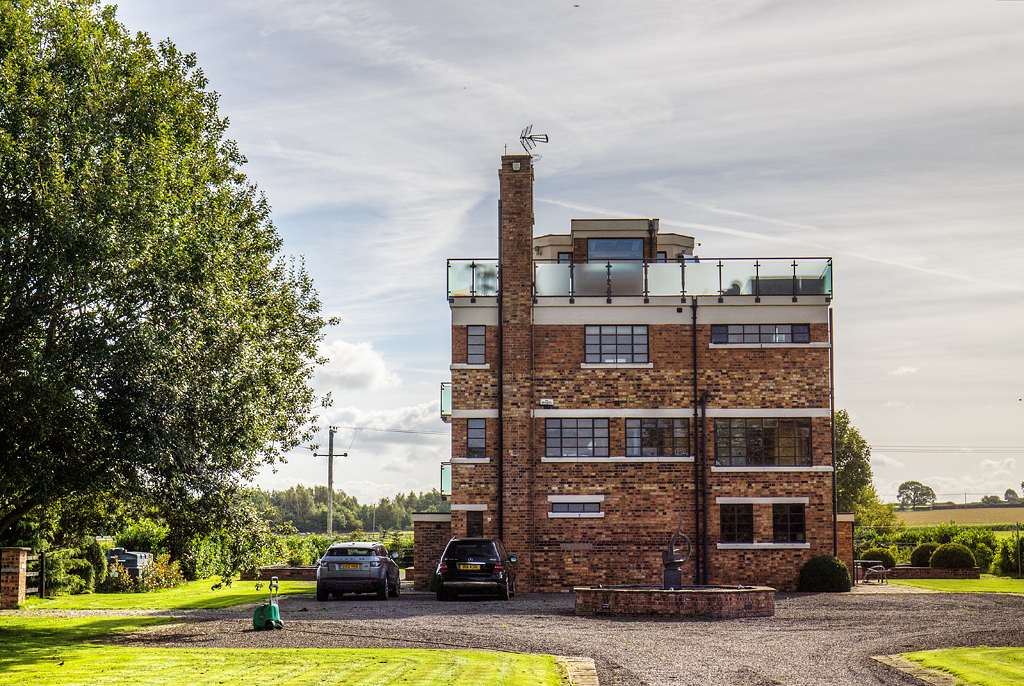
WWII Shropshire: RAF/RNAS Hinstock/HMS Godwit - Control Tower. Standard naval four-storey control tower, restored as a home in recent times named 'HMS Godwit'

Following the closure of the station and sale of the land out of defence use, the airfield was derelict. In 2005, the control tower block had gained local planning permission for the then owner to convert the control tower into a four-storey house. As a home it was named "HMS Godwit".

The former barracks on the site remained largely as it was in 1945 except for some slight alterations and improvements to prevent deterioration. In March 2025 the owner of HMS Godwit (the former control tower), sought further planning permission to convert the barracks into a single level dwelling for his future occupation.

== See also ==
- List of Royal Air Force Satellite Landing Grounds
- List of air stations of the Royal Navy
- List of Fleet Air Arm aircraft squadrons
