= Flag Officer, Flying Training =

Defunct senior Royal Navy appointment

Office of the Flag Officer, Flying Training
- Ensign of the Royal Navy
- Admiralty, Ministry of Defence
- Reports to: Flag Officer, Air (Home), later Flag Officer Naval Air Command
- Nominator: First Sea Lord
- Appointer: Prime Minister; Subject to formal approval by the Queen-in-Council
- Term length: Not fixed (typically 1–3 years)
- Inaugural holder: Rear-Admiral Lachlan D. Mackintosh
- Formation: September 1945 – November 1970

The Flag Officer, Flying Training, later called Flag Officer Naval Flying Training, was a senior Royal Navy appointment responsible for all naval aviation flying training from 1945 to 1970.

== History ==
Vice-Admiral Lumley Lyster held the post of Flag Officer Carrier Training and Administration from its establishment on April 27, 1943, to September 1945. In September 1945, Vice-Admiral Lyster hauled down his flag and his post was abolished. Instead three separate admirals' posts supervising different areas of naval aviation training were created. One of them was the appointment of Flag Officer, Flying Training. The post was abolished in 1970.

The officer holder reported to the Flag Officer, Air (Home) from 1945 to 1964 then the Flag Officer Naval Air Command from 1964 to 1970.

== Flag Officer's, Flying Training ==
Post holders included:

- Rear-Admiral Lachlan D. Mackintosh: September 1945 – September 1947
- Rear-Admiral Charles E. Lambe: September 1947 – August 1949
- Rear-Admiral Edmund W. Anstice: August 1949 – August 1951
- Rear-Admiral Walter T. Couchman: August 1951 – June 1953
- Rear-Admiral Guy Willoughby: June 1953 – February 1956
- Rear-Admiral Charles L.G. Evans: February 1956 – October 1957
- Rear-Admiral Dennis R.F. Cambell: October 1957 – September 1960
- Rear-Admiral Frank H.E. Hopkins: September 1960 – October 1961
- Rear-Admiral Philip D. Gick: October 1961 – July 1964

== Flag Officer Naval Flying Training ==
- Rear-Admiral Donald C.E.F. Gibson: July 1964 – October 1965
- Rear-Admiral David W. Kirke: October 1965 – February 1968
- Rear-Admiral Cedric K. Roberts: February 1968 – November 1970
