= RNAS Eastleigh =

Former Royal Naval Air Station in Hampshire, England

RNAS Eastleigh HMS Raven RAF Eastleigh RAF Southampton
- Southampton, Hampshire in England

Site information
- Owner: Air Ministry
- Operator: Royal Navy; Royal Air Force
- Controlled by: Fleet Air Arm
- Condition: Civil aviation

Location
- Shown within Hampshire RNAS Eastleigh (the United Kingdom)
- Coordinates: 50°57′01″N 1°21′24″W

Site history
- Built: 1939
- In use: 1939 - 1947
- Fate: became Southampton Airport
- Battles/wars: European theatre of World War II

Airfield information
Runways
| Direction | Length and surface |
|---|---|
| NNE/SSW | Grass |
| WNW/ESE | Grass |

Royal Naval Air Station Eastleigh, more commonly referred to as RNAS Eastleigh; (commissioned HMS Raven), is a former Royal Navy Naval Air Station located in Southampton, Hampshire, UK,

The site was previously RAF Eastleigh and RAF Southampton.

== History ==
The following units were here at some point:

- No. 7 Squadron RAF between 27 October and 19 November 1919 as a cadre before moving to Farnborough Airport
- No. 28 Squadron RAF between 20 October 1919 and 20 January 1920 as a cadre before disbanding
- No. 42 Squadron RAF as a detachment between March and September 1938 with Vildebeeste's
- No. 45 Squadron RAF between 15 October and 31 December 1919 as a cadre before disbanding
- No. 101 Squadron RAF between 11 October and 31 December 1919 as a cadre before disbanding
- No. 201 Squadron RAF between 2 September and 31 December 1919 as a cadre before disbanding
- No. 224 Squadron RAF between 17 January and 26 March 1938 with the Avro Anson I before moving to RAF Thornaby
- No. 269 Squadron RAF between 17 January and 24 March 1939 with the Anson I before moving back to RAF Abbotsinch
- Rota Experimental Flight between 20 April and 17 June 1939 when the unit moved to RNAS Lee-on-Solent (HMS Daedalus) with the Avro Rota
- 716 Naval Air Squadron between 28 June 1944 and 1 September 1945 as the School of Safety Equipment with Sea Otter I's and the Vickers Wellington XI
- 758 Naval Air Squadron between 1 July 1939 and 4 October 1940 as a Telegraphist Air Gunner Training squadron with Shark II's and Osprey III's
- 759 Naval Air Squadron between 26 May and 1 July 1939 as a Telegraphist Air Gunner Training squadron
- 760 Naval Air Squadron between 1 April and 16 September 1940 as a Fleet Fighter Pool with Blackburn Skua II's, Blackburn Roc I's and a Gloster Sea Gladiator
- 780 Naval Air Squadron between 2 October 1939 and 7 October 1940 as a Conversion Course Unit with Hawker Hart trainer's and other aircraft
- 800 Naval Air Squadron between 29 February 1936 and 7 June 1938 as a Fleet Fighter squadron with Nimrod I's and Osprey's
- 801 Naval Air Squadron between 23 November 1935 and 28 September 1936 as a Fleet Fighter squadron with Nimrod I's and Osprey's
- 802 Naval Air Squadron between 5 May and 23 June 1937 as a Fleet Fighter squadron with Nimrod I's and Osprey's
- 810 Naval Air Squadron between 29 March 1938 and 27 April 1939 as a Fleet Torpedo Bomber squadron with Fairey Swordfish I's
- 811 Naval Air Squadron between 1 July and 12 August 1939 as a Fleet Torpedo Bomber squadron with Swordfish I's
- 814 Naval Air Squadron formed here on 1 December 1938 and stayed until 2 June 1939, it was a Torpedo Spotter Reconnaissance squadron with Swordfish I's
- 816 Naval Air Squadron between 4 and 14 June 1941 with Swordfish I's
- 820 Naval Air Squadron between 20 July 1936 and 27 April 1939 as a Fleet Spotter Reconnaissance squadron with Swordfish I's
- 821 Naval Air Squadron between 27 October 1937 and 29 July 1939 as a Torpedo Spotter Reconnaissance squadron with Swordfish I's
- 822 Naval Air Squadron between 21 May 1936 and 23 January 1937 then again between 1 July and 12 August 1939 as a Spotter Reconnaissance squadron
- 825 Naval Air Squadron on 17 January 1938
- 829 Naval Air Squadron between 21 December 1941 and 30 January 1942 as a Torpedo Spotter Reconnaissance squadron with Swordfish II's

== Current use ==
The site is now Southampton Airport.

== See also ==
- List of air stations of the Royal Navy
