= 734 Naval Air Squadron =

Inactive flying squadron of the Royal Navy's Fleet Air Arm

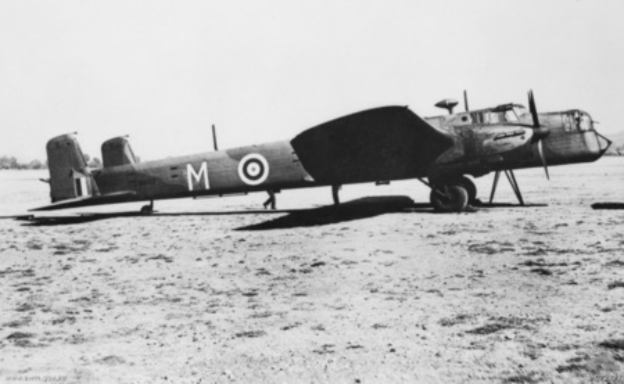
- An Armstrong Whitworth Whitley MkVII, similar to the aircraft used by 734 NAS
- Active: 1944–1946
- Disbanded: 21 February 1946
- Country: United Kingdom
- Branch: Royal Navy
- Type: Fleet Air Arm Second Line Squadron
- Role: Engine Handling Unit
- Size: Squadron
- Part of: Fleet Air Arm
- Home station: See Naval air stations section for full list.

Insignia
- Identification Markings: W0A+

Aircraft flown
- Bomber: Armstrong Whitworth Whitley

734 Naval Air Squadron (734 NAS) was a Fleet Air Arm (FAA) naval air squadron of the United Kingdom’s Royal Navy (RN). It was active between February 1944 and February 1946, formed as a naval Engine Handling Unit and operated solely with Armstrong Whitworth Whitley medium bomber aircraft. It formed at and initially operated out of HMS Kestrel, RNAS Worthy Down, and then subsequently relocated to HMS Godwit, RNAS Hinstock and the satellite RNAS Peplow, where it eventually disbanded.

== History ==
=== Engine Handling Unit (1944–1946) ===
734 Naval Air Squadron was formed on 14 February 1944, at RNAS Worthy Down (HMS Kestrel), located 3.5 miles (6 km) north of Winchester, Hampshire, England, as an Engine Handling Unit. The squadron solely operated Armstrong Whitworth Whitley Mk VII aircraft, an RAF Coastal Command variant. The Fleet Air Arm used these modified, ex-Royal Air Force Mk VIIs, to train the aircrew, having previously evaluated the Armstrong Whitworth Whitley. The pre-war designed bombers were fitted out to become a 'flying classroom', with instrumentation and fuel flow meters, to give student pilots an understanding of throttle and boost settings, to train those aircrew, converting from biplanes, on the correct way to handle the Rolls-Royce Merlin-powered Fairey Barracuda aircraft.

On 21 August 1945, 734 Naval Air Squadron moved from RNAS Worthy Down to RNAS Hinstock (HMS Godwit), located in Hinstock, Shropshire, England, however, it operated out of RNAS Hinstock's satellite airfield, RNAS Peplow (HMS Godwit II), also located in Shropshire, which was a former Royal Air Force bomber airbase, with long runways, that could easily accommodate the Armstrong Whitworth Whitley aircraft.

In November 1945 six Avro Lancaster, a four-engined heavy bomber aircraft, were transferred from the Air Ministry to the Admiralty, intended to replace the Armstrong Whitley operated by 734 Naval Air Squadron. The squadron was to also have been the only Fleet Air Arm unit to receive Boeing B-17 Flying Fortress, an American four-engined heavy bomber aircraft, however, none of this came to fruition with the squadron being disbanded on 21 February 1946 and the Avro Lancaster aircraft were instead issued to 780 Naval Air Squadron Advanced Flying Training Squadron.

== Aircraft flown ==
The squadron only flew one aircraft type:

- Armstrong Whitworth Whitley Mk VII maritime patrol aircraft variant (February 1944-February 1946)

== Naval air stations ==
734 Naval Air Squadron operated from a couple of naval air stations of the Royal Navy, in England:

- Royal Naval Air Station Worthy Down (HMS Kestrel), Hampshire, (14 February 1944 - 21 August 1945)
- Royal Naval Air Station Hinstock (HMS Godwit), Shropshire, (21 August 1945 - 21 February 1946)
  - Royal Naval Air Station Peplow (HMS Godwit II), Shropshire, (satellite 21 August 1945 - 21 February 1946)
- disbanded - (21 February 1946)

== Commanding officers ==
List of commanding officers of 734 Naval Air Squadron, with date of appointment:

- Lieutenant Commander(A) R.C. Cockburn, DSO, RNVR, from 14 February 1944
- Lieutenant(A) R.G. Parkes, RNVR, from 5 December 1945
- disbanded - 21 February 1946

Note: Abbreviation (A) signifies Air Branch of the RN or RNVR.
