= 759 Naval Air Squadron =

Inactive flying squadron of the Royal Navy's Fleet Air Arm

- Squadron badge
- Active: 1939–1946; 1951–1954; 1963–1969
- Disbanded: 24 December 1969
- Country: United Kingdom
- Branch: Royal Navy
- Type: Fleet Air Arm Second Line Squadron
- Role: Fighter School and Pool Squadron; Naval Air Fighter School; Naval Advanced Flying Training School
- Size: Squadron
- Part of: Fleet Air Arm
- Home station: See Naval air stations section for full list.
- Aircraft: See Aircraft operated section for full list.
- Decorations: Boyd Trophy 1965

Commanders
- Notable commanders: Captain Edgar Duncan Goodenough Lewin CB, CBE, DSO, DSC & Bar, RN; Admiral Sir Raymond Derek Lygo, KCB, RN

Insignia
- Squadron Badge Description: Blue, in front of a torch inflamed two swords in saltire winged at the hilts all gold (1942)
- Identification Markings: single letters Y1A+ to Y7A+ (later); 161-179 (Seafire); 180-183 (Firebrand); 210-215 (Sea Fury); 410-417 (Meteor); 451-456 (Sea Hornet); 180-182 (Sea Vampire 1951); 220-240 (Sea Vampire 1953); 655-664 to 800-811 (Hunter)
- Fin Shore Codes: CW:CU Seafire; CW Firebrand; CW Sea Fury; CW:CU:LM Meteor; CW Sea Hornet; CW:CU Sea Vampire (1951); LM Sea Vampire (November 1953); BY Hunter

759 Naval Air Squadron (759 NAS), also referred to as 759 Squadron, is an inactive Fleet Air Arm (FAA) naval air squadron of the United Kingdom's Royal Navy (RN). The squadron was last active at RNAS Brawdy (HMS Goldcrest), Pembrokeshire, from 1963, as the Naval Advanced Flying Training School, operating with Hawker Hunter T.8 jet trainer aircraft, before finally disbanding in 1969.

It was created on 1 November 1939, initially intended as a Telegraphist Air Gunner Training Squadron but became a Fighter School and Pool Squadron in 1939, at RNAS Eastleigh (HMS Raven). It operated out of RNAS Yeovilton from 1940 to 1946, as part of the Naval Air Fighter School. In 1943 a detachment operated out of RNAS Angle (HMS Goldcrest), working with 794 Squadron and known as the Naval Air Firing Unit.

It was again the Naval Air Fighter School upon reformation in 1951 and disbandment in 1954, firstly at RNAS Culdrose (HMS Seahawk) and then moving to RNAS Lossiemouth (HMS Fulmar), in 1953.

== History ==
=== Fighter School and Pool Squadron (1939-1946) ===
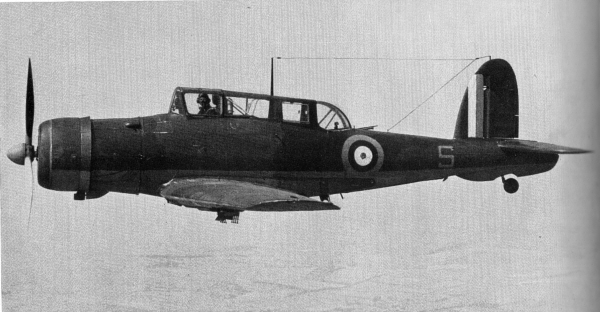
Blackburn Skua Mk.II dive-bomber / fighter, L2928 "S" of 759 NAS.

759 Naval Air Squadron formed at RNAS Eastleigh (HMS Raven), in Hampshire, on 1 May 1939, intended as a Telegraphist Air Gunner Training Squadron, but renumbered as 758 Naval Air Squadron on 1 July 1939. 759 Naval Air Squadron reformed as a Fighter School and Pool Squadron on 1 November 1939, at HMS Raven. It was initially equipped with nine Blackburn Skua carrier-based dive bomber / fighter aircraft, five Blackburn Roc carrier-based fighter aircraft and four Gloster Sea Gladiator biplane fighter aircraft. On 1 December 1939, the squadron absorbed 769 Naval Air Squadron and became the Fleet Fighter School.

Ten months later, on 16 September 1940, the squadron was transferred to RNAS Yeovilton (HMS Heron), near Yeovil, Somerset, here it received Grumman Martlet American carrier-based fighter aircraft, Fairey Fulmar British carrier-based reconnaissance and fighter aircraft and Miles Master British two-seat advanced trainer aircraft. In 1941 Hawker Sea Hurricanes were acquired; these were a navalised version of the Hawker Hurricane fighter aircraft. The squadron was the Advanced Flying School training, as part of the No. 1 Naval Air Fighter School, from April 1943. It had over sixty Hawker Sea Hurricane, over twenty Fairey Fulmar, fifteen Miles Master and eight Supermarine Spitfire fighter aircraft at this point. From 1 July to 22 November 1943, a detachment from 759 Naval Air Squadron operated out of RNAS Angle (HMS Goldcrest), in Pembrokeshire, utilising its Hawker Sea Hurricane and Fairey Fulmar aircraft, known as the Naval Air Firing Unit.

An instrument training flight, known as 'E' Flight, was formed the following year, in 1944. The flight used Airspeed Oxfords twin-engine training aircraft and was operated as a sub-unit of 759 Naval Air Squadron. Vought Corsair American carrier-based fighter-bomber aircraft were received later in 1944, and this led to the creation of a conversion flight, designated 'A' flight, a camera air-to-air combat instruction flight, known as 'C' flight, and 'D' flight, for dummy deck-landing training; however, these flights became 760 Naval Air Squadron in April 1945.

In September 1945, the squadron moved to RNAS Zeals (HMS Hummingbird), in Wiltshire, while RNAS Yeovilton (HMS Heron)'s runways were repaired, returning to HMS Heron in January 1946. 759 Naval Air Squadron disbanded at RNAS Yeovilton on 5 February 1946.

=== Naval Air Fighter School (1951-1954) ===
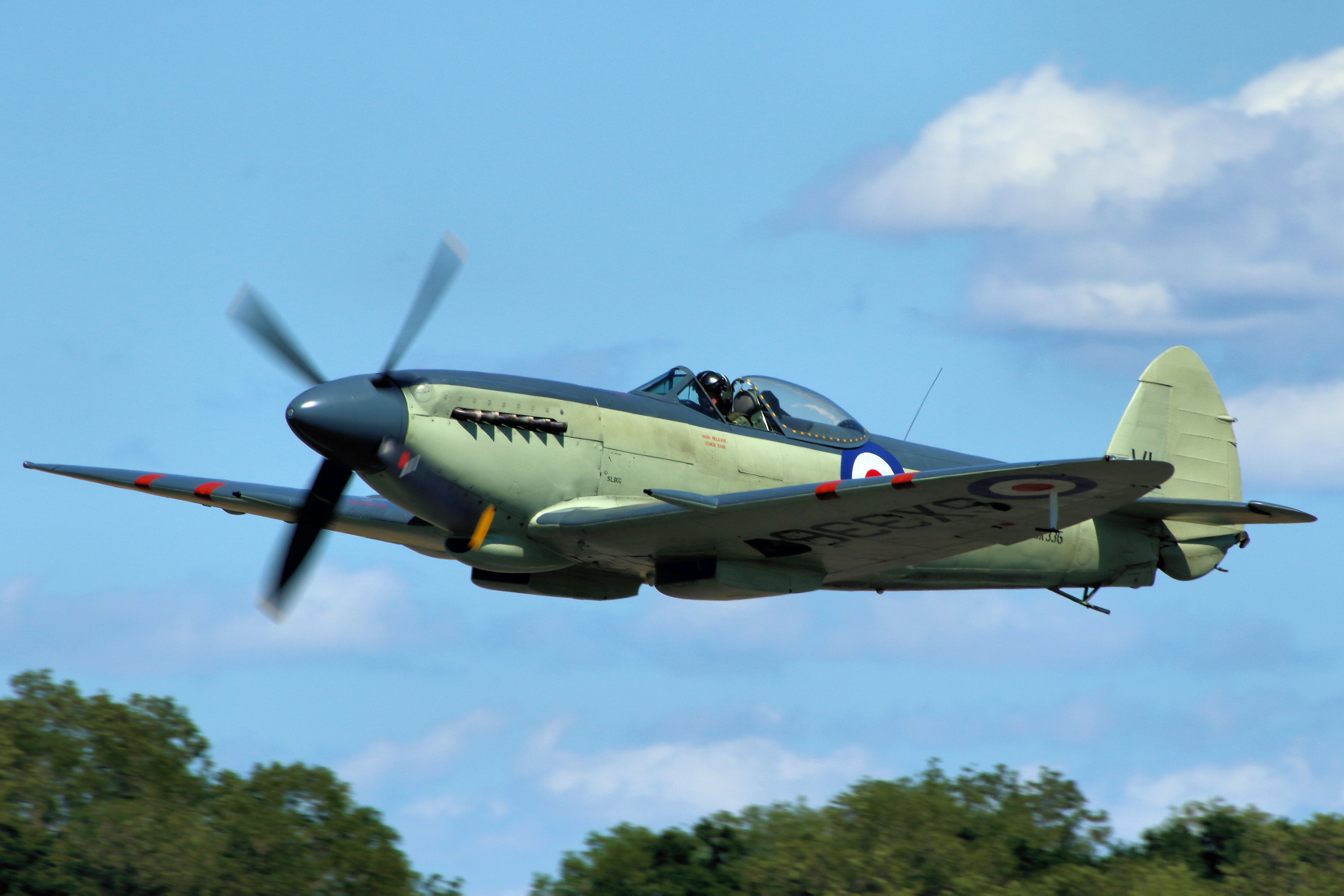
Supermarine Seafire F Mk XVII, in the markings of 767 NAS, of the type used by 759 NAS

759 Naval Air Squadron reformed at RNAS Culdrose (HMS Seahawk), near Helston on the Lizard Peninsula of Cornwall, on 16 August 1951, out of a part of 738 Naval Air Squadron, known as the No. 1 Operational Flying School, it was part of the Naval Air Fighter School located at RNAS Culdrose. It was equipped with the Blackburn Firebrand British single-engine strike fighter and Supermarine Seafire navalised carrier-capable version of the Supermarine Spitfire fighter.

The following year a Jet Conversion Course was added to the training courses and this pre-empted the squadron acquiring de Havilland Sea Vampire and Gloster Meteor T.7 British jet fighter aircraft.

In November 1953, the squadron moved to RNAS Lossiemouth (HMS Fulmar), located on the western edge of the town of Lossiemouth in Moray, north-east Scotland, and remained there for just under twelve months. The squadron disbanded there on 12 October 1954, into 736 Naval Air Squadron.

=== Naval Advanced Flying Training School (1963-1969) ===
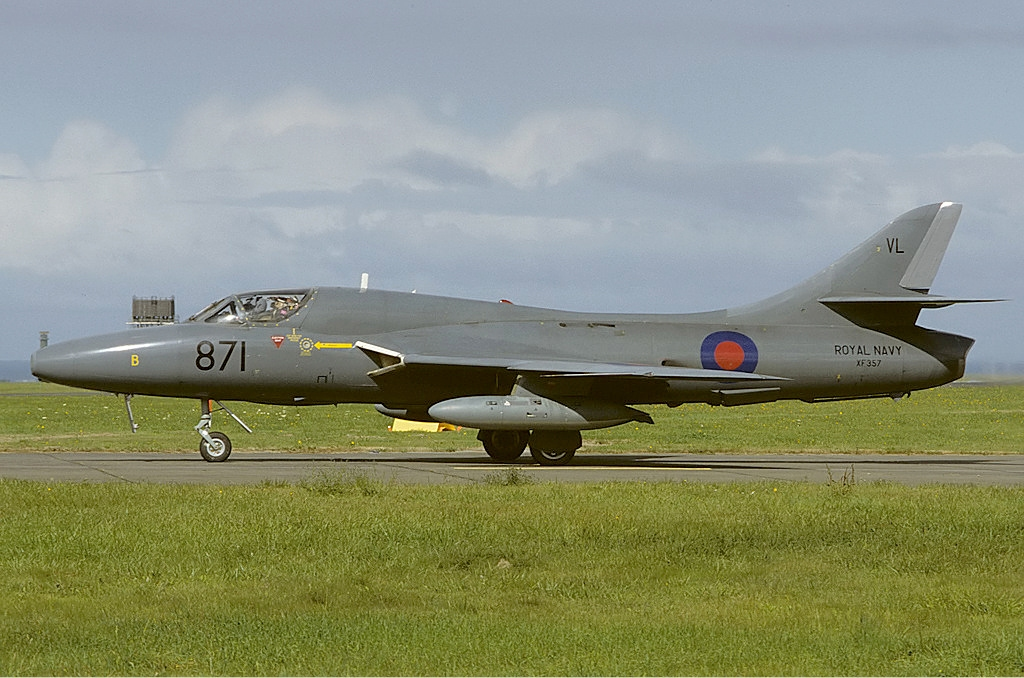
FAA Hawker Hunter T8C, an example of the type used by 759 NAS

759 Naval Air Squadron reformed at RNAS Brawdy (HMS Goldcrest), located 6.3 miles (10.1 km) east of St Davids, Pembrokeshire, on 1 August 1963, as the Naval Advanced Flying Training School. Here it was equipped with Hawker Hunter T.8 two-seat jet trainer aircraft for the Royal Navy (RN), fitted with an arrestor hook for use on RN airfields. The squadron provided Part 1 of the Fleet Air Arm's Advance Flying Training course. Students were then either moved on to 738 Naval Air Squadron for weapons training or to 849 Naval Air Squadron for Airborne Early Warning (AEW) operational flying training.

In 1965, 759 Naval Air Squadron received the annual Boyd Trophy, which is awarded annually to the naval pilot(s) or aircrew who, in the opinion of the Flag Officer, Naval Air Command, has achieved the finest feat of aviation during the previous year. This was awarded to the squadron for its outstanding work in converting Jet Provost-trained pilots to the Hawker Hunter jet aircraft.

On 24 December 1969, 759 Naval Air Squadron disbanded at RNAS Brawdy (HMS Goldcrest).

== Aircraft operated ==
The squadron has operated a number of different aircraft types, including:

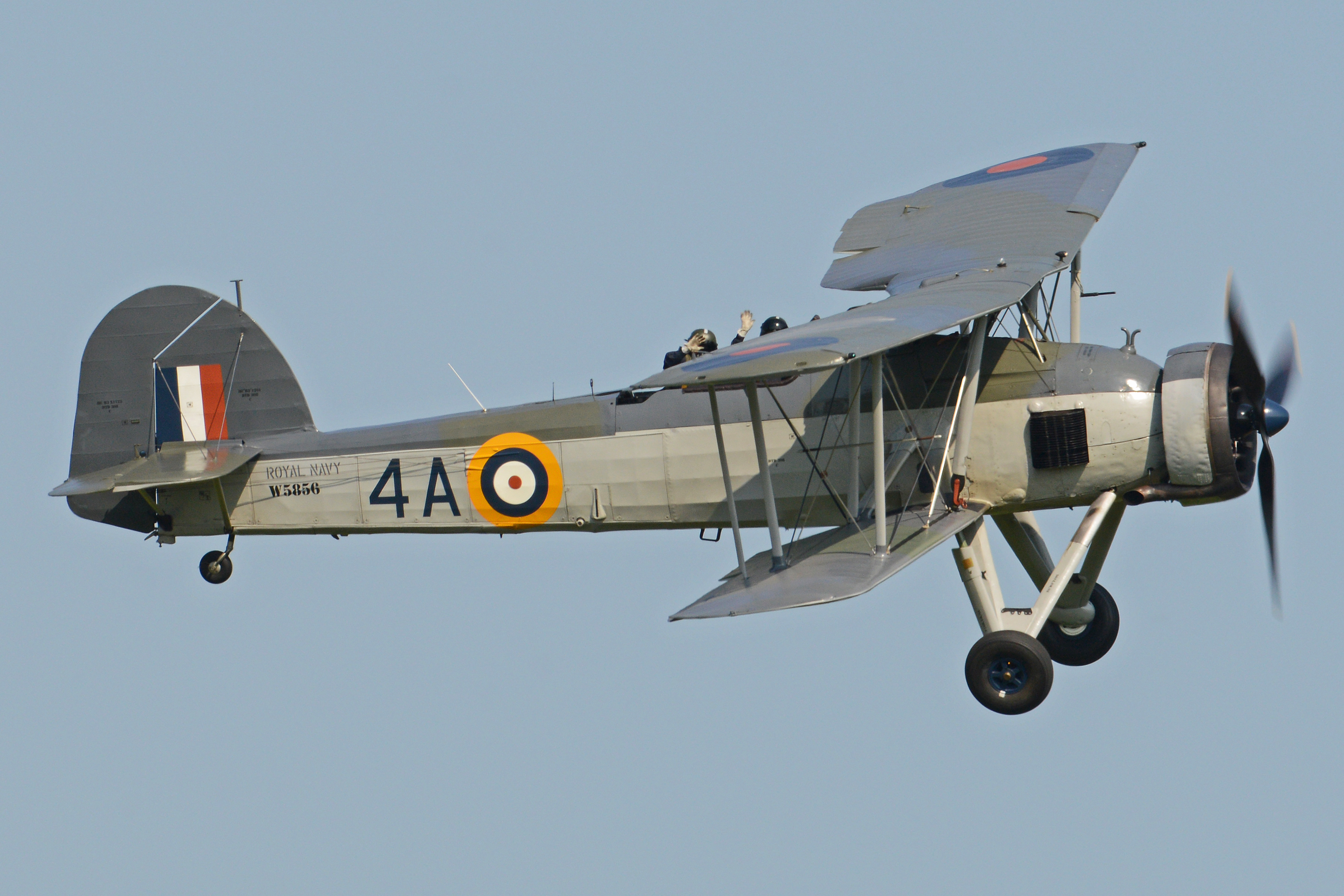
Fairey Swordfish I

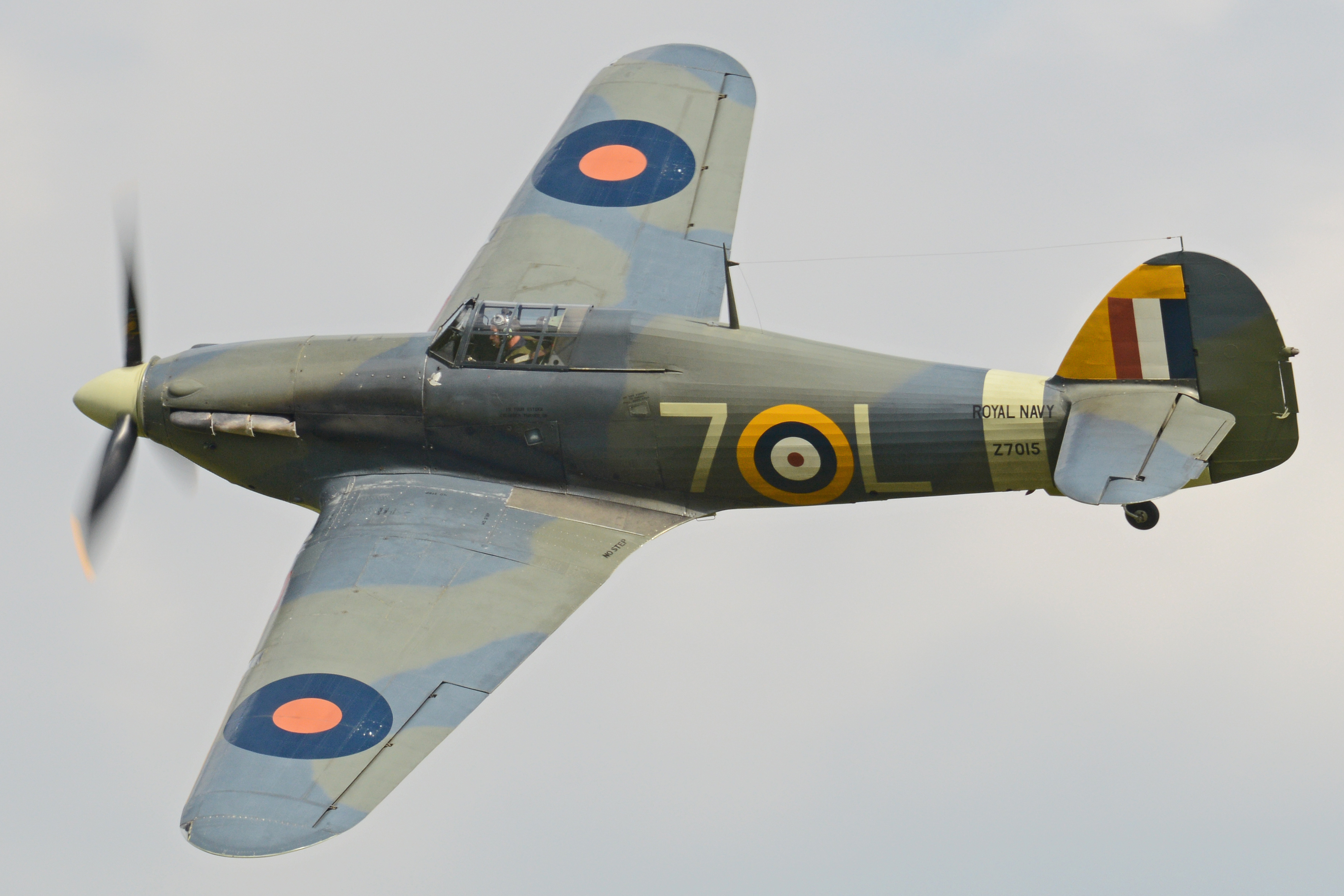
Hawker Sea Hurricane Mk IB

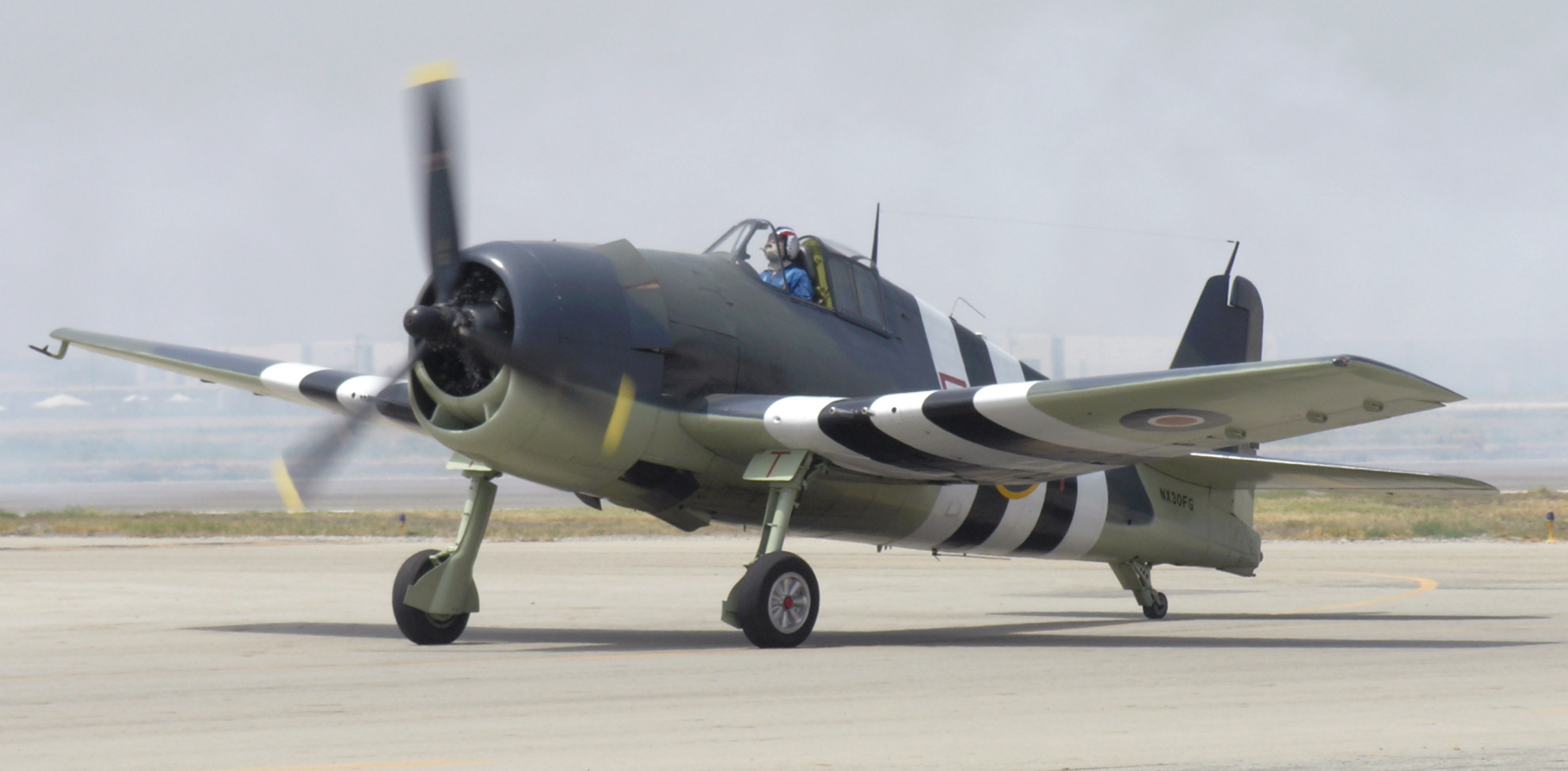
Grumman Hellcat

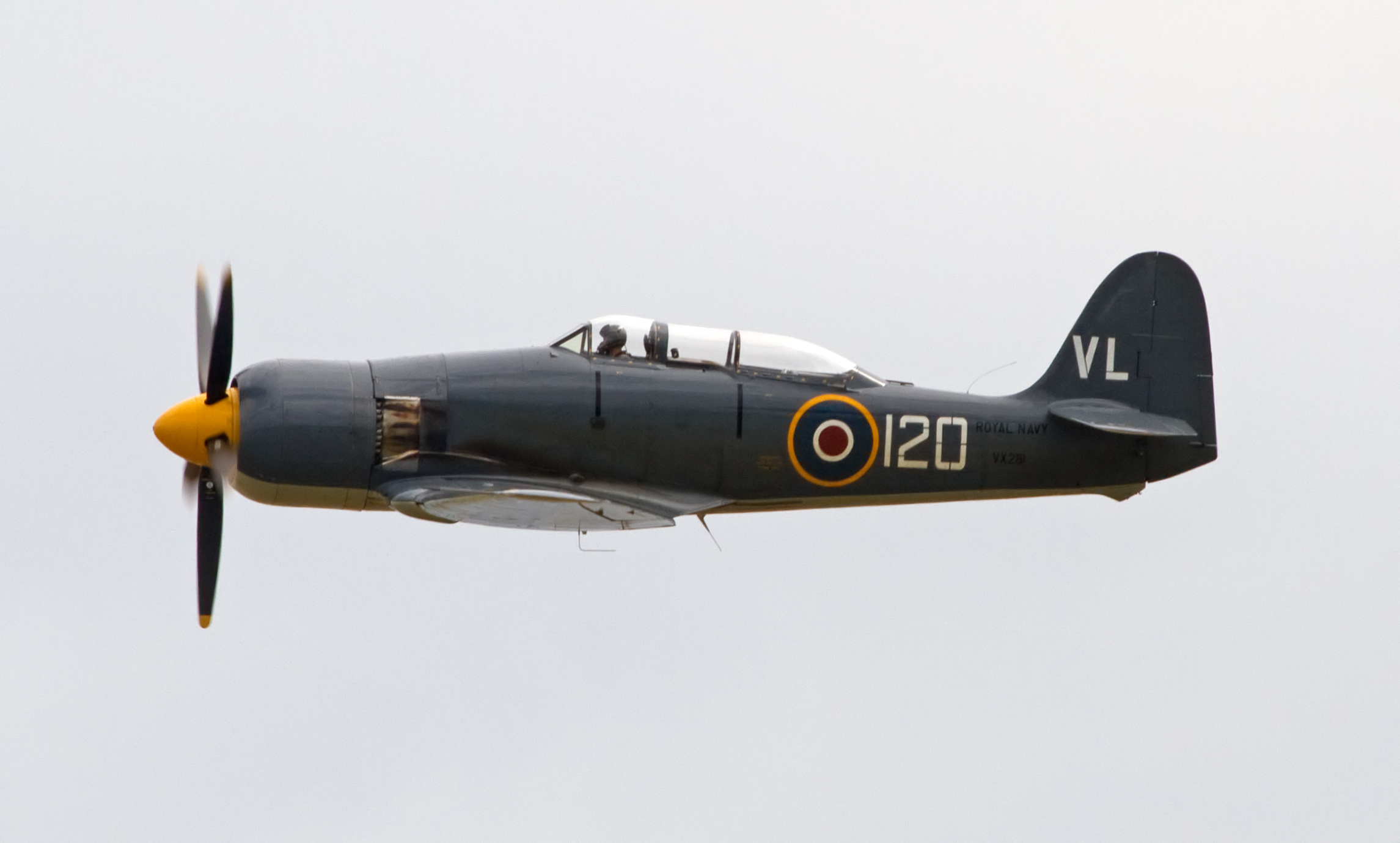
Hawker Sea Fury T.20

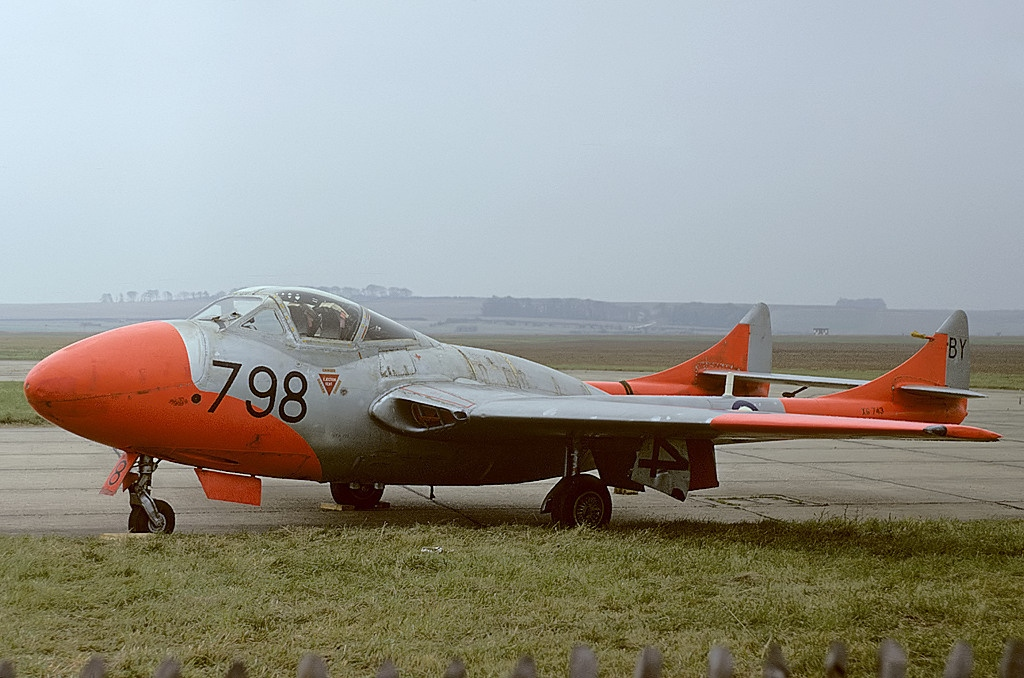
de Havilland Sea Vampire T.22

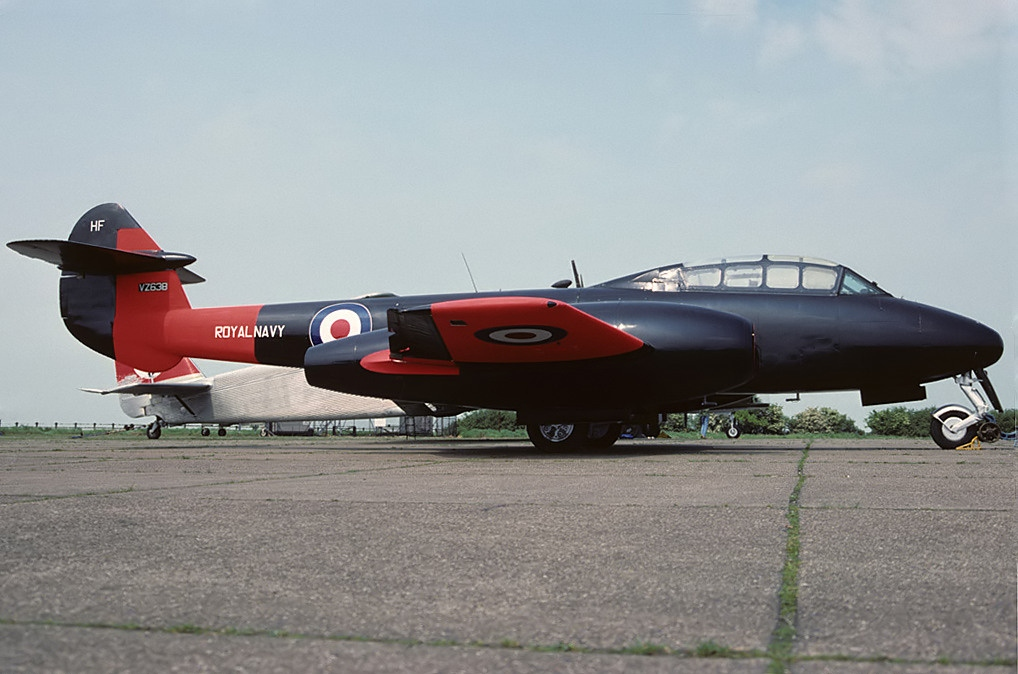
Gloster Meteor T.7

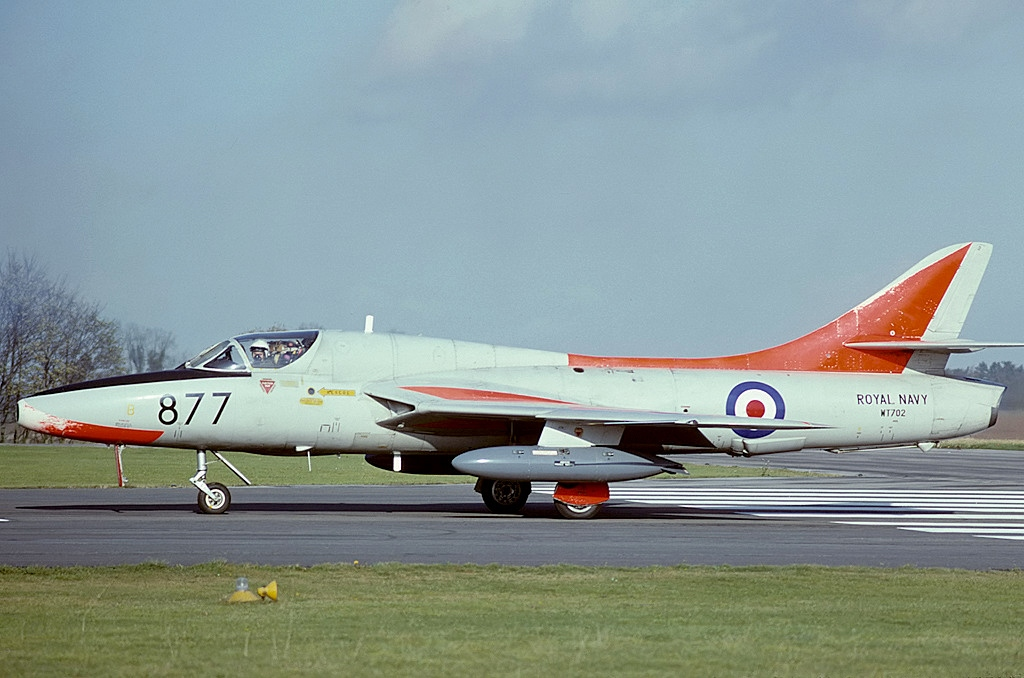
Hawker Hunter T.8C

- Blackburn Roc fighter aircraft (November 1939 - June 1941)
- Blackburn Skua Mk.II dive bomber and fighter aircraft (November 1939 - June 1941)
- Fairey Swordfish I torpedo bomber (November 1939 - June 1941)
- Gloster Sea Gladiator fighter aircraft (November 1939 - May 1943)
- de Havilland DH.60G Gypsy Moth trainer aircraft (January 1940 - March 1943)
- Miles Master I advanced trainer aircraft (February 1940 - May 1944)
- Hawker Osprey I fighter and reconnaissance aircraft (March 1940 - August 1940)
- Percival Proctor IA radio trainer and communications aircraft (March 1940 - February 1943)
- Hawker Nimrod I fighter aircraft (April 1940)
- de Havilland DH.87 Hornet Moth trainer aircraft (May 1940 - June 1940)
- de Havilland DH.85 Leopard Moth communications aircraft (May 1940 - June 1940)
- Fairey Fulmar Mk.I reconnaissance/fighter aircraft (May 1940 - July 1943)
- Brewster Buffalo fighter aircraft (September 1940 - July 1941)
- Grumman Martlet Mk I fighter aircraft (October 1940 - May 1944)
- Miles M.18 utility aircraft (January 1941)
- Fairey Fulmar Mk.II reconnaissance/fighter aircraft (February 1941 - May 1943)
- Hawker Sea Hurricane Mk IB fighter aircraft (May 1941 - March 1944)
- Hawker Hurricane Mk.I fighter aircraft (June 1941 - March 1944)
- Percival Proctor II radio trainer and communications aircraft (February 1943)
- Hawker Sea Hurricane Mk IIC fighter aircraft (February 1943 - August 1943)
- Fairey Swordfish II torpedo bomber (May 1943)
- Supermarine Spitfire Mk Ia fighter aircraft (May 1943 - August 1944)
- Supermarine Spitfire Mk Va fighter aircraft (May 1943 - October 1944)
- Supermarine Spitfire Mk Vb fighter aircraft (May 1943 - October 1944)
- Bristol Blenheim Mk.IV light bomber (July 1943 - September 1944)
- de Havilland Tiger Moth trainer aircraft (July 1943 - February 1944)
- Percival Proctor IIa radio trainer (August 1943 - December 1943)
- Supermarine Spitfire Mk II fighter aircraft (August 1943 - October 1943)
- Supermarine Seafire Mk Ib fighter aircraft (August 1943 - January 1945)
- Miles Master II advanced trainer aircraft (September 1943 - November 1945)
- Bristol Blenheim Mk.I light bomber (October 1943)
- Grumman Martlet Mk IV fighter aircraft (November 1943 - July 1945)
- Airspeed Oxford trainer aircraft (January 1944 - February 1946)
- Supermarine Seafire F Mk IIc fighter aircraft (February 1944 - February 1945)
- Vought Corsair Mk II fighter bomber (March 1944 - April 1944)
- Vought Corsair Mk III fighter bomber (September 1944 - February 1946)
- Grumman Wildcat Mk V fighter aircraft (October 1944 - May 1945)
- North American Harvard III advanced trainer (March 1945 - February 1946)
- Vought Corsair Mk IV fighter bomber (October 1945 - November 1945)
- Supermarine Seafire F Mk III fighter aircraft (December 1945 - February 1946)
- Grumman Hellcat F. Mk. II fighter aircraft (January 1946)
- Supermarine Seafire F Mk XV fighter aircraft (January 1946 - February 1946)
- de Havilland Sea Hornet F.20 fighter aircraft (August 1951 - February 1953)
- de Havilland Sea Hornet PR.22 photo-reconnaissance aircraft (August 1951 - September 1952)
- Blackburn Firebrand T.F. 5 strike fighter (August 1951 - February 1953)
- Supermarine Seafire F Mk XVII fighter aircraft (August 1951 - July 1954)
- Hawker Sea Fury T.20 trainer aircraft (February 1952 - January 1954)
- de Havilland Vampire T.11 jet trainer aircraft (July 1952 - November 1953)
- Supermarine Seafire F Mk 47 fighter aircraft (September 1952 - November 1953)
- Gloster Meteor T.7 jet trainer aircraft (September 1952 - April 1954)
- de Havilland Sea Vampire F.20 jet fighter aircraft (October 1952 - March 1954)
- de Havilland Sea Vampire T.22 jet trainer aircraft (November 1953 - October 1954)
- Hawker Hunter T.8 jet trainer aircraft (August 1963 - December 1969)

== Naval air stations ==
759 Naval Air Squadron operated from a number of naval air stations of the Royal Navy, in Wales, Scotland and England:

1939

- Royal Naval Air Station Eastleigh (HMS Raven), Hampshire, (26 May 1939 – 1 July 1939)
- became 758 Naval Air Squadron (1 July 1939)

1939 - 1946

- Royal Naval Air Station Eastleigh (HMS Raven), Hampshire, (1 November 1939 – 16 September 1940)
- Royal Naval Air Station Yeovilton (HMS Heron), Somerset, (16 September 1940 – 19 September 1945)
  - satellite Royal Naval Air Station Haldon (HMS Heron II), Devon
  - Royal Air Force Warmwell, Dorset; E & F Flights (18 May - 1 July 1943)
  - Royal Naval Air Station Angle (HMS Goldcrest), Pembrokeshire, (Detachment 1 July - 22 November 1943)
- Royal Naval Air Station Zeals (HMS Hummingbird), Wiltshire, (19 September 1945 – 7 January 1946)
- Royal Naval Air Station Yeovilton (HMS Heron), Somerset, (7 January 1946 – 5 February 1946)
- disbanded - (5 February 1946)

1951 - 1954

- Royal Naval Air Station Culdrose (HMS Seahawk), Cornwall, (16 August 1951 – 28 November 1953)
- Royal Naval Air Station Lossiemouth (HMS Fulmar), Moray, (28 November 1953 – 12 October 1954)
  - satellite Royal Naval Air Station Milltown (HMS Fulmar II), Moray
- disbanded - (12 October 1954)

1963 - 1969

- Royal Naval Air Station Brawdy (HMS Goldcrest), Pembrokeshire, (1 August 1963 – 24 December 1969)
- disbanded (24 December 1969)

== Commanding officers ==
List of commanding officers of 759 Naval Air Squadron with date of appointment:

1939 - 1946

- Lieutenant Commander B.H.M. Kendall, RN, from 1 November 1939
- Lieutenant Commander H.P. Bramwell, DSO, DSC, RN, from 18 November 1940
- Captain F.D.G. Bird, RM, from 1 August 1941
- Lieutenant Commander J.N. Garnett, RN, from 13 October 1941
- Lieutenant Commander E.W.T. Taylour, DSC, RN, from 8 December 1941
- Lieutenant D.P.Z. Cox, RN, from 7 April 1942
- Lieutenant(A) E.D.G. Lewin, DSO, DSC, RN, from 12 November 1942
- Lieutenant Commander J.M. Bruen, DSO, DSC, RN, from 7 December 1942
- Lieutenant Commander N.G. Hallett, DSC, RN, from 17 May 1943
- Major F.D.G. Bird, RM, from 20 December 1943
- Lieutenant Commander O.N. Bailey, RN, from 10 July 1944
- Lieutenant Commander J.W. Sleigh, DSO, DSC, RN, from 14 December 1944
- disbanded - 5 February 1946

1951 - 1954

- Lieutenant Commander R.D. Lygo, RN, from 16 August 1951
- Lieutenant Commander D.R.O. Price, DFC, RN, from 30 May 1953
- Lieutenant Commander W.D.D. MacDonald, RN, from 20 July 1954
- disbanded - 12 October 1954

1963 - 1969

- Lieutenant Commander C.D.W. Pugh, MBE, RN, from 1 August 1963
- Lieutenant Commander A.H. Milnes, RN, from 6 January 1964
- Lieutenant Commander C.S. Casperd, RN, from 8 March 1965
- Lieutenant Commander M.I. Darlington, RN, from 26 October 1966
- Lieutenant Commander C.C.N. Davis, RN, from 17 June 1968
- disbanded - 24 November 1969

=== 759E Flight ===
List of commanding officers of E Flight, 759 Naval Air Squadron, with date of appointment:

1945 - 1946

- Lieutenant Commander(A) T. McVey, RNR, from 13 December 1943
- Lieutenant Commander(A) E.A.R. Forwood, OBE, RNVR, from 13 July 1944 (Commander 1 January 1945)
- disbanded - 28 March 1946

Note: Abbreviation (A) signifies Air Branch of the RN or RNVR.
