= Bratton, Shropshire =

Coordinates: 52.7278°N 2.5393°W

Bratton
- Village
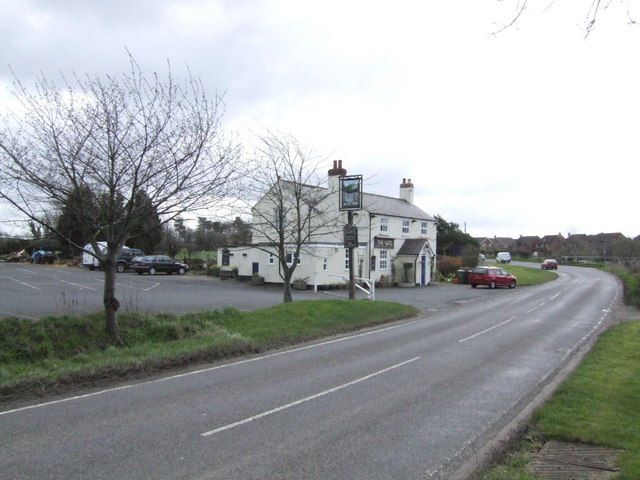
- The Gate Pub, Bratton

- Location within Shropshire
  - London: 140 mi (230 km) SE
- Civil parish: Wrockwardine
- Unitary authority: Telford and Wrekin
- Ceremonial county: Shropshire
- Region: West Midlands
- Country: England
- Sovereign state: United Kingdom
- Post town: TELFORD
- Postcode district: TF5
- Dialling code: 01952
- Police: West Mercia
- Fire: Shropshire
- Ambulance: West Midlands
- UK Parliament: The Wrekin

Bratton is a suburban village in the borough of Telford and Wrekin in Shropshire, England. It is conjoined to nearby Wellington.

== Geography ==
The countryside around Bratton is largely flat lowland, but to the south there are hills, the highest point within sight being the Wrekin, which stands on the horizon some four miles to the south. The nearest towns are Wellington and Telford, which lie to the southeast and are the source of most urban services.

== Local services ==
Bratton has a school, the St Peter's Church of England Primary School.

== Climate ==
The average temperature in the area is 8°C. In July, the warmest month, the average is 18°C, and in December this falls to 0°C.

== See also ==
- RAF Bratton
