= 798 Naval Air Squadron =

Inactive flying squadron of the Royal Navy's Fleet Air Arm

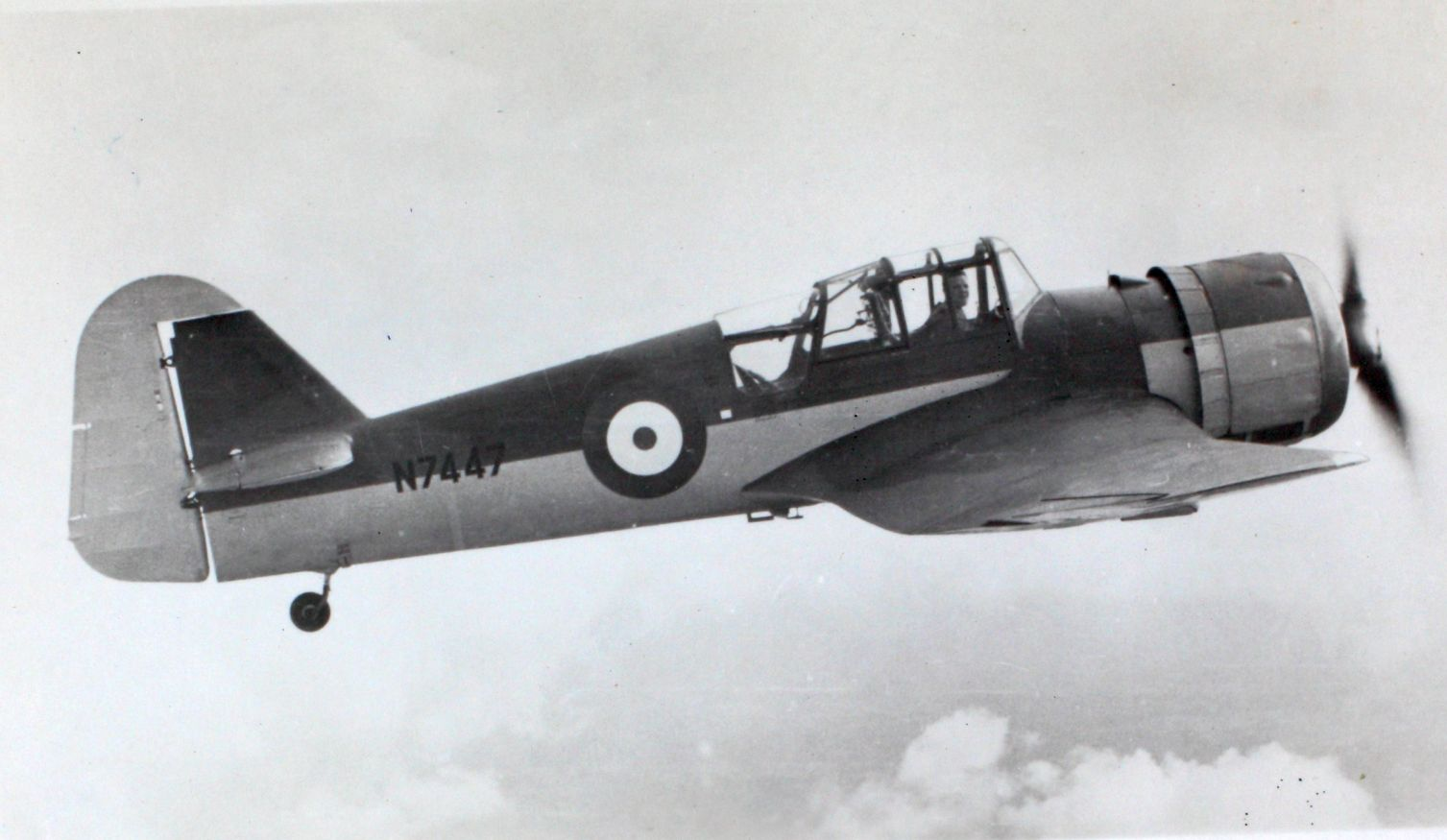
- Miles Master II; an example of the type used by 798 NAS
- Active: 1943–1946
- Disbanded: 18 March 1946
- Country: United Kingdom
- Branch: Royal Navy
- Type: Fleet Air Arm Second Line Squadron
- Role: Advanced Single Engine Conversion & Refresher Flying Training Unit
- Size: Squadron
- Part of: Fleet Air Arm
- Home station: See Naval air stations section for full list.
- Aircraft: See Aircraft flown section for full list.

Insignia
- Identification Markings: L1A+ to L4A+ (from October 1943); U2A+ & U3A+ (from November 1945)

798 Naval Air Squadron (798 NAS), also sometimes called 798 Squadron, is an inactive Fleet Air Arm (FAA) naval air squadron of the United Kingdom’s Royal Navy (RN). It was an Advanced Single Engine Conversion & Refresher Flying Training Unit, which last disbanded in March 1946.

It formed at HMS Daedalus, RNAS Lee-on-Solent, in October 1943, to provide advanced conversion courses, it initially operated with various single and twin-engined aircraft. Twin-engined aircraft broke away to become 762 Naval Air Squadron during March 1944. It had a detachment at HMS Blackcap, RNAS Stretton, for operational training for new Fairey Barracuda squadrons, but returned to HMS Daedalus at the beginning of August.

The unit’s role changed slightly during 1945, providing refresher training, including Fleet Air Arm ex-Prisoners of War at HMS Sparrowhawk, RNAS Halesworth. The squadron moved to HMS Godwit, RNAS Hinstock, although operated out of its satellite HMS Godwit, RNAS Peplow, during November 1945.

== History ==
=== Advanced Conversion Course ===
798 Naval Air Squadron formed at HMS Daedalus, RNAS Lee-on-Solent, on 11 October 1943, to provide aircrew conversion courses. It was titled as an Advanced Conversion Course, and was initially equipped with both single and twin-engined aircraft, including Fairey Barracuda, which was a British single-engined carrier-borne torpedo and dive bomber, Bristol Beaufighter, a British twin-engined multi-role aircraft, Bristol Beaufort, a British twin-engined torpedo bomber, Bristol Blenheim, a British twin-engined light bomber, Fairey Fulmar, a British single-engines carrier-borne reconnaissance and fighter aircraft, Miles Master, a British single-engined two-seat advanced trainer, Airspeed Oxford a British twin-engined trainer aircraft and de Havilland Tiger Moth a British single-engined biplane trainer aircraft.

In March 1944 the twin-engined aircraft broke away to form 762 Naval Air Squadron. From 20 April 1944 the squadron operated a detachment at HMS Blackcap, RNAS Stretton, in Cheshire, England. It provided operational conversion training for new Fairey Barracuda equipped squadrons, but returned to Lee-on-Solent at the beginning of August. The squadron also received Fairey Firefly a British carrier-borne fighter and anti-submarine aircraft, and North American Harvard, an American single-engined advanced trainer aircraft, during 1944.

==== Refresher Flying Training Unit ====
During 1945 the squadron had a role change and provided refresher and familiarisation training courses. On 6 September 798 NAS relocated to RNAS Halesworth (HMS Sparrowhawk), in Suffolk, England and here it provided Fleet Air Arm ex-prisoners of war refresher courses, with the North American Harvard aircraft, following their return home. In November the squadron moved again, to RNAS Hinstock (HMS Godwit), in Shropshire, England and also utilising RNAS Peplow (HMS Godwit II), Shropshire. It was here on 18 March 1946 that 798 Naval Air Squadron disbanded.

== Aircraft flown ==
The squadron operated a variety of different aircraft and versions:

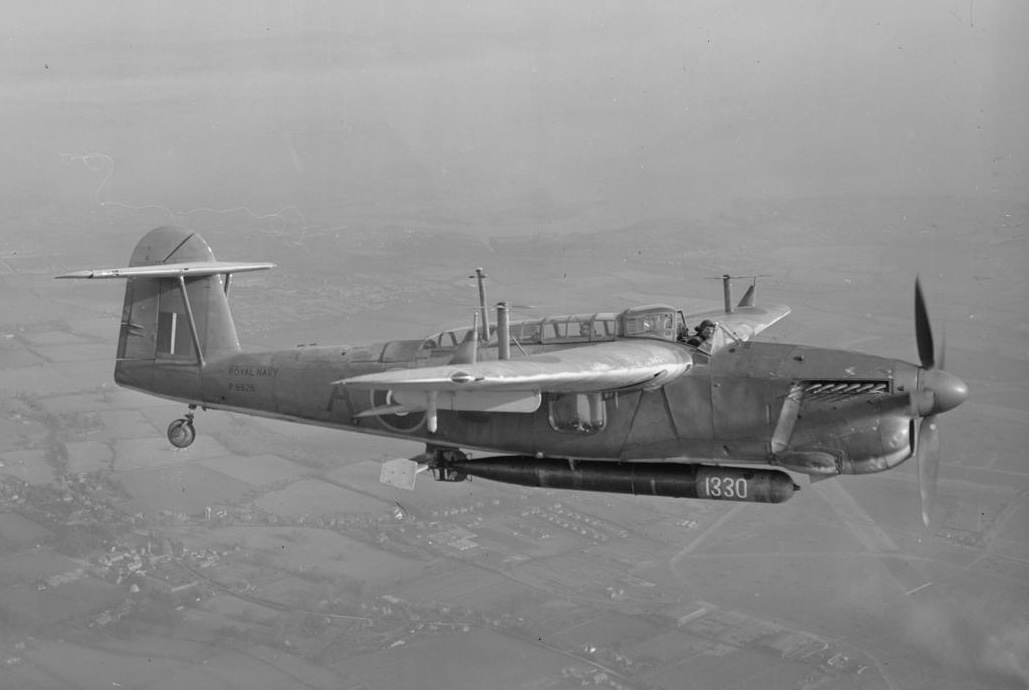
Fairey Barracuda Mk II

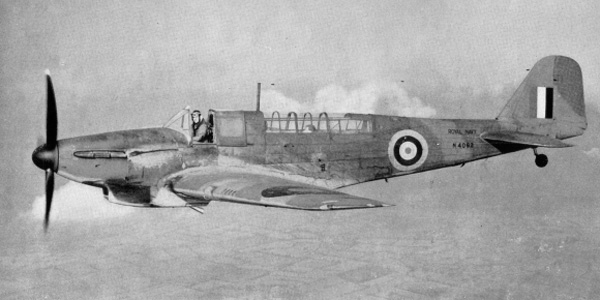
Fairey Fulmar Mk.II

- Fairey Barracuda Mk II torpedo and dive bomber (October 1943 - October 1945)
- Bristol Beaufighter Mk.IIF multi role aircraft (October 1943 - March 1944)
- Bristol Beaufort Mk.Ia torpedo bomber (October 1943 - March 1944)
- Bristol Blenheim Mk.IV light bomber (October 1943 - March 1944)
- Fairey Fulmar Mk.II reconnaissance/fighter aircraft (October 1943 - April 1945)
- Miles Master I advanced trainer (October 1943 - August 1944)
- Airspeed Oxford trainer aircraft (October 1943 - March 1946)
- de Havilland Tiger Moth trainer aircraft (October 1943 - April 1945)
- Grumman Avenger Mk.II torpedo bomber (April 1944 - June 1945)
- North American Harvard III advanced trainer (July 1944 - October 1945)
- Miles Master II advanced trainer (July 1944 - October 1945)
- Fairey Firefly I fighter and anti-submarine aircraft (November 1944 - March 1945)
- Supermarine Spitfire Mk IX fighter aircraft (December 1944 - February 1945)
- Supermarine Spitfire Mk Vb fighter aircraft (January - September 1945)
- North American Harvard IIB advanced trainer (January - October 1945)
- Supermarine Seafire Mk Ib fighter aircraft (March - July 1945)
- Avro Anson I multi-role aircraft (April 1945)
- Fairey Barracuda Mk III torpedo and dive bomber (May 1945)
- Supermarine Seafire Mk IIc fighter aircraft (June - August 1945)
- Supermarine Seafire Mk III fighter aircraft (June - August 1945)

== Naval air stations ==
798 Naval Air Squadron operated from a number of naval air stations of the Royal Navy, in England:

- Royal Naval Air Station Lee-on-Solent (HMS Daedalus), Hampshire, (11 October 1943 - 6 September 1945)
  - Royal Naval Air Station Stretton (HMS Blackcap), Cheshire, (Detachment 20 April - 30 July 1944)
- Royal Naval Air Station Halesworth (HMS Sparrowhawk), Suffolk, (6 September 1945 - 28 November 1945)
- Royal Naval Air Station Hinstock (HMS Godwit), Shropshire, (satellite Royal Naval Air Station Peplow (HMS Godwit II), Shropshire) (28 November 1945 - 18 March 1946)
  - Royal Naval Air Station Burscough (HMS Ringtail), Lancashire, (Detachment 5 December 1945 - 19 February 1946)
- disbanded - (18 March 1946)

== Commanding officers ==
List of commanding officers of 798 Naval Air Squadron with date of appointment:

- Lieutenant Commander(A) I.J. Wallace, OBE, RNVR, from 11 October 1943
- Lieutenant Commander(A) S.W. Birse, DSC, RNR, from 8 August 1945
- disbanded - 18 March 1946

Note: Abbreviation (A) signifies Air Branch of the RN or RNVR.
