= RAF Peplow =

Former Royal Air Force station in Shropshire, England

RAF Peplow RNAS Peplow HMS Godwit II HMS Godwit
- Child's Ercall Aerodrome
- Peplow, Shropshire in England
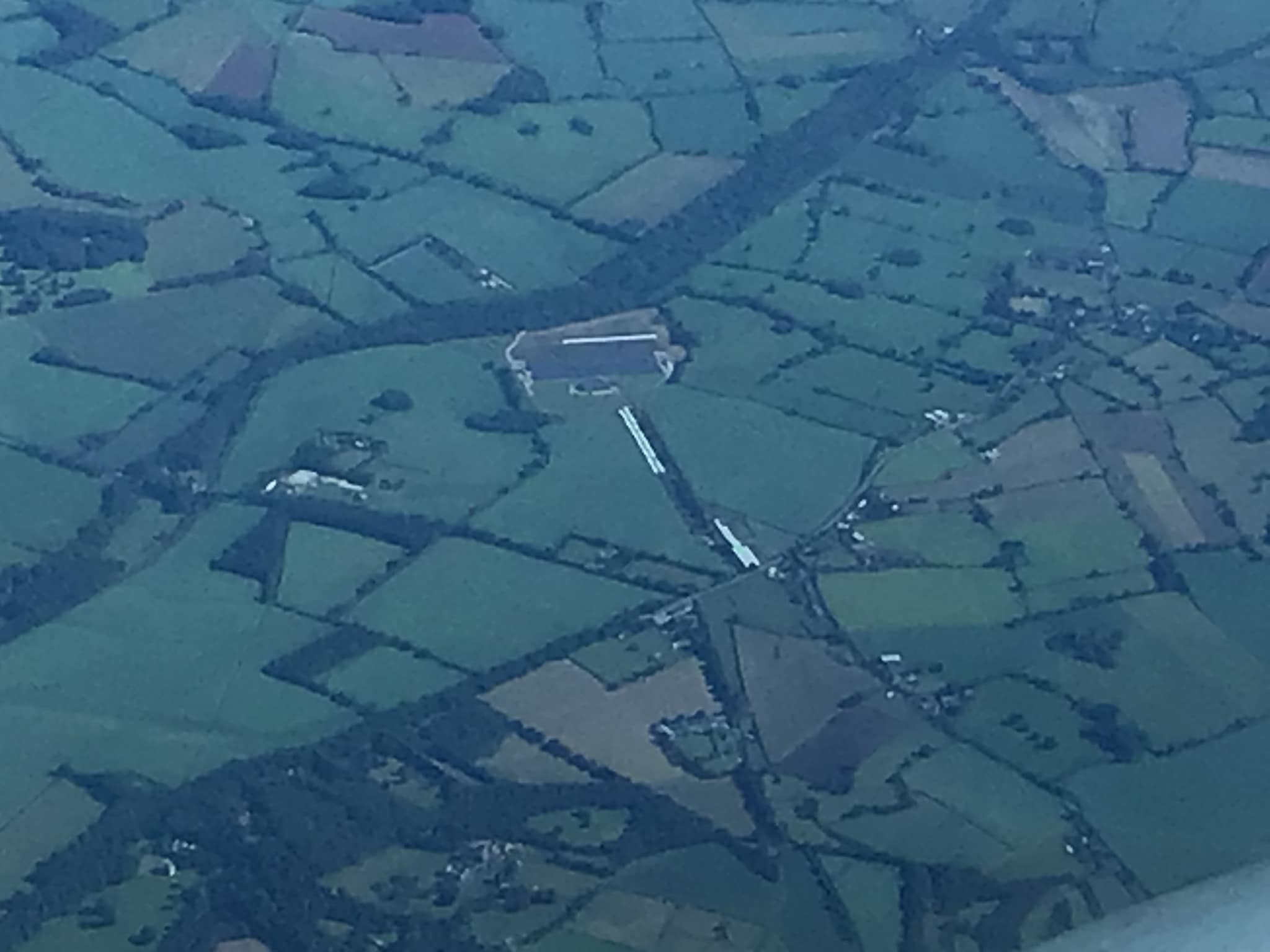
- Aerial View of RAF Peplow (2024)

Site information
- Type: Royal Air Force station
- Owner: Air Ministry
- Operator: Royal Air Force; Royal Navy
- Controlled by: RAF Flying Training Command; Fleet Air Arm
- Condition: Disused

Location
- Shown within Shropshire RAF Peplow (the United Kingdom)
- Coordinates: 52°48′20″N 2°30′16″W

Site history
- Built: 1940
- In use: 1941-1945 (Royal Air Force); 1945-1949 (Royal Navy)
- Fate: Aviation / Farmland / Industry / Leisure / Public road

Airfield information
- Elevation: 230 feet (70 m) AMSL
Runways
Direction	Length and surface
00/18	1,400 yards (1,280 m) x 50 yards (46 m) Concrete and woodchips
04/22	2,000 yards (1,829 m) x 50 yards (46 m) Concrete and woodchips
12/30	1,400 yards (1,280 m) x 50 yards (46 m) Concrete and woodchips
- Source: Royal Navy Research Archive

Royal Air Force Peplow, or more simply RAF Peplow, is a former Royal Air Force station located 7 miles (11 km) South of Market Drayton in Shropshire, England. It was operational between 1941 and 1949, being used by both the Royal Air Force (1942-1945) and the Royal Navy (1945–1947).

The following units were here at some point:

- No. 5 Service Flying Training School RAF
- No. 11 Service Flying Training School RAF
- No. 21 (Pilots) Advanced Flying Unit RAF
- No. 83 Operational Training Unit RAF
- 734 Naval Air Squadron
- 758 Naval Air Squadron
- 772 Naval Air Squadron
- 780 Naval Air Squadron
- 798 Naval Air Squadron
- No. 1515 (Beam Approach Training) Flight RAF
