= Flag Officer, Carriers and Amphibious Ships =

- Ensign of the Royal Navy
- Admiralty, Ministry of Defence
- Reports to: Commander-in-Chief Fleet
- Nominator: Secretary of State for Defence
- Appointer: Prime Minister; Subject to formal approval by the Queen-in-Council
- Term length: Not fixed (typically 1–4 years)
- Inaugural holder: Rear-Admiral Reginald G. H. Henderson
- Formation: 1970-1979

Flag Officer, Carriers and Amphibious Ships (FOCAS) was a senior Royal Navy post that existed from 1970 to 1979. However, its antecedents date to 1931.

A Flag Officer with specific responsibilities for command of aircraft carriers within the Royal Navy was first established in September 1931 with the appointment of Rear-Admiral Reginald Henderson as Rear-Admiral, Aircraft Carriers. He was succeeded by Rear-Admiral the Hon. Sir Alexander R. M. Ramsay later Vice-Admiral, Aircraft Carriers. The post was held by successive flag officers under the titles listed below. In June 1968 the post Rear-Admiral, Carriers was renamed to Flag Officer, Carriers and Amphibious Ships (FOCAS). The post was renamed Flag Officer, Third Flotilla in December 1979.

The office holder reported to different senior flag officers during its existence including the Commander-in-Chief, Home Fleet, the Commander-in-Chief, Western Fleet and finally the Commander-in-Chief Fleet.

== Rear-Admirals/Vice-Admirals Aircraft Carriers ==
Post holders included:

	Rank	Flag	Name	Term	Notes
Rear-Admiral/Vice-Admiral (A), Aircraft Carriers
1	Rear-Admiral	Rear-Admiral - Royal Navy	Reginald G. H. Henderson	September 1931-September.1933	
2	Rear-Admiral	Rear-Admiral - Royal Navy	the Hon. Sir Alexander R. M. Ramsay	September 1933-March 1936	(VAdm by 06/1936)
3	Vice-Admiral	Vice-Admiral - Royal Navy	Noel F. Laurence	March 1936-July 1937	
4	Vice-Admiral	Vice-Admiral - Royal Navy	Guy C. C. Royle	July 1937-July 1939	
5	Vice-Admiral	Vice-Admiral - Royal Navy	Lionel V. Wells	July 1939-July 1940	
6	Rear-Admiral	Rear-Admiral - Royal Navy	Lumley Lyster	July 1940 - August 1940	Post renamed Flag Officer, Mediterranean Aircraft Carriers in September 1940.

== Flag Officer, Mediterranean Aircraft Carriers ==
	Rank	Flag	Name	Term	Notes
Flag Officer, Mediterranean Aircraft Carriers
1	Rear-Admiral	Rear-Admiral - Royal Navy	Lumley Lyster	September 1940 to 4 February 1941	office renamed FO/MAC 09.1040
2	Rear-Admiral	Rear-Admiral - Royal Navy	Denis Boyd	February 1941 to January 1942	
Post is re-established within the Home Fleet July 1942 till December 1943.

== Admirals Commanding, Home Fleet Aircraft Carriers ==
Rank	Flag	Name	Term	Title / Remarks
Vice-Admiral	Vice-Admiral - Royal Navy	Lumley Lyster	July 1942 - 21 May 1943	Rear-Admiral, then Vice-Admiral, Home Fleet Aircraft Carriers, aboard HMS Indomitable
Rear-Admiral	Rear-Admiral - Royal Navy	Reginald Henderson	21 May 1943 – 1 December 1943	Rear-Admiral, Home Fleet Aircraft Carriers

On hauling down his flag as Vice-Admiral, Home Fleet Aircraft Carriers, about 27 April 1943, Admiral Lyster was appointed Flag Officer Carrier Training and Administration at HMS Monck (HQ Combined Training, Largs), which was transferred from 1 June 1944 to HMS Faraway, a training establishment & HQ of Flag Officer Carrier Training, at Greenock. He served in that post until 17.03.1945.

Rear-Admiral Charles Woodhouse was listed as Rear-Admiral Aircraft Carriers, aboard HMS Implacable, March–April 1946.

== Flag Officer, Aircraft Carriers ==
Duties may have included (a) being responsible for the Fleet Air Arm afloat (b) ensuring the operational effectiveness of Carrier Task Groups. Probably referring to pre-1967 when Home Fleet still existed.

Admirals flying this flag included:

	Rank	Flag	Name	Term	Notes
Flag Officer, Aircraft Carriers
1	Rear-Admiral	Rear-Admiral - Royal Navy	Walter T. Couchman	December 1953-December 1954	(as first Flag Officer, Aircraft Carriers)
2	Rear-Admiral	Rear-Admiral - Royal Navy	Arthur R. Pedder	December 1954-May 1956	
3	Vice-Admiral	Vice-Admiral - Royal Navy	Manley L. Power	May 1956-October 1957	
4	Rear-Admiral	Rear-Admiral - Royal Navy	Hector C. D. MacLean	October 1957-January 1958	
5	Vice-Admiral	Vice-Admiral - Royal Navy	Sir Alexander N.C. Bingley	January 1958-January 1959	
6	Vice-Admiral	Vice-Admiral - Royal Navy	Charles L.G. Evans	January 1959-March 1960	
7	Rear-Admiral	Rear-Admiral - Royal Navy	Richard M. Smeeton	March 1960-January 1962	
8	Vice-Admiral	Vice-Admiral - Royal Navy	Frank H.E. Hopkins	January 1962-January 1963	
9	Rear-Admiral	Rear-Admiral - Royal Navy	Donald C.E.F. Gibson	January 1963-April 1964	
10	Rear-Admiral	Rear-Admiral - Royal Navy	H. Richard B. Janvrin	April 1964-February 1966	Also Commander Carrier Striking Group Two, STRIKFLTLANT.
11	Rear-Admiral	Rear-Admiral - Royal Navy	William D. O’Brien	February 1966-April 1967	
12	Rear-Admiral	Rear-Admiral - Royal Navy	L. Derek Empson	April 1967-June 1970	
13	Rear-Admiral	Rear-Admiral - Royal Navy	Michael F. Fell	June 1968 - July 1970	

In July 1970 the post was renamed Flag Officer, Carriers and Amphibious Ships.

== Flag Officer, Carriers and Amphibious Ships ==
Included:

	Rank	Flag	Name	Term	Notes
Flag Officer, Carriers and Amphibious Ships
1	Rear-Admiral	Rear-Admiral - Royal Navy	Michael F. Fell	July 1970	
2	Rear-Admiral	Rear-Admiral - Royal Navy	John D. Treacher	July 1970-May 1972	
3	Vice-Admiral	Vice-Admiral - Royal Navy	Raymond D. Lygo	May 1972-January 1974	
4	Rear-Admiral	Rear-Admiral - Royal Navy	Desmond Cassidi	January 1974-May 1975	Ordered to fly out to Cyprus 1974 to become Naval Deputy to Commander British Forces Near East, Air Marshal Aiken.
5	Vice-Admiral	Vice-Admiral - Royal Navy	James H.F. Eberle	May 1975-March 1977	
6	Vice-Admiral	Vice-Admiral - Royal Navy	William D.M. Staveley	March 1977-July 1978	
7	Rear-Admiral	Rear-Admiral - Royal Navy	Peter G.M. Herbert	July 1978 – July 1979	
