= John Treacher =

Royal Navy Admiral (1924–2018)

Admiral Sir John Treacher KCB
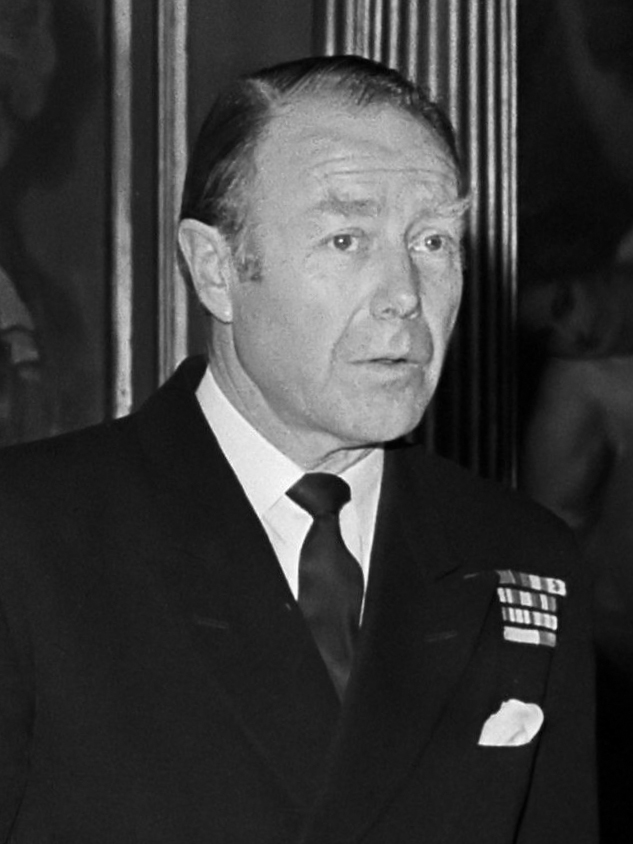
- Admiral Sir John Treacher in 1977
- Born: 23 September 1924; Chile
- Died: 30 April 2018 (aged 93); London, England
- Military career
- Allegiance: United Kingdom
- Branch: Royal Navy
- Service years: 1941–1977
- Rank: Admiral
- Commands: Fleet (1975–77); Naval Air Command (1972–73); Carriers and Amphibious Ships (1970–72); HMS Eagle (1968–70); HMS Lowestoft (1964–66); 849 Naval Air Squadron (1952–53); 778 Naval Air Squadron (1951)
- Conflicts: Second World War; Korean War
- Awards: Knight Commander of the Order of the Bath

Admiral Sir John Devereux Treacher, KCB (23 September 1924 – 30 April 2018) was a senior officer in the Royal Navy who served as Commander-in-Chief Fleet from 1975 to 1977.

== Early life and education ==
Treacher was born in the German Clinic in Concepción, Chile, to Frank Charles Treacher and Glady Mary Treacher (née Page). He spent his early life in Chile before his family moved to England. They spent a few years at Clopton, Suffolk before moving to London. Treacher attended Colet Court and St Paul's School. Treacher sat for the Civil Service examination in May 1942 and attended the Royal Naval College, Dartmouth.

== Naval career ==
=== World War II ===
Treacher was commissioned into the Royal Navy in 1942. As a midshipman, he served onboard the battleship HMS Nelson (28) and the Town-class cruiser HMS Glasgow (C21). He served onboard the Glasgow as part of Operation Neptune, (the Normandy landings) where she made up the Gunfire Bombardment Support Force C for Omaha Beach. Glasgow was hit and damaged during the operation.

Treacher subsequently served onboard the Thornycroft type destroyer leader HMS Keppel (D84), participating in the Arctic convoys. Promoted to sub-lieutenant, he joined the Black Swan-class sloop HMS Mermaid (U30).

=== Post-war career ===
Treacher volunteered to join the Fleet Air Arm and reported at RAF Booker in April 1947 for basic flying training. After attending advanced flying training at RAF Ouston, he was awarded his wings and reported to RNAS Lossiemouth. He joined the 800 Naval Air Squadron in March 1949. The squadron was part of the 13th Carrier Air Group embarked on HMS Triumph (R16). After the Amethyst incident, Triumph joined the Far East Fleet, headquartered at Singapore. During the Korean War, Treacher flew Supermarine Seafire and served as the Carrier Air Group Administration Officer.

After returning from the Far East, Treacher joined the 703 Naval Air Squadron, the Service Trials Unit (STU). After a short stint in 703 Squadron, he was selected to be trained in Airborne Early Warning (AEW) in the USA and on return, command the first AEW squadron of the Royal Navy. He trained at the Naval Air Station, Norfolk and the VAW-12 (then called VC-12) at the NAS Quonset Point. The 778 Naval Air Squadron was commissioned on 5 November 1951 at RNAS Culdrose (HMS Seahawk) with Treacher as the commissioning squadron commander. The squadron transitioned from a training role to an operational role under him in July 1952, and became 849 Naval Air Squadron. He led the squadron during the Coronation review of the fleet in June 1953. After relinquishing command of 849 Squadron in July 1953, Treacher was appointed to the office of the Second Sea Lord and Chief of Naval Personnel. However, after a short stint, he was appointed flag lieutenant and personal pilot to the Senior Naval Officer, British Joint Staff Mission, Vice Admiral Sir Geoffrey Barnard. Before taking the appointment up, he attended the staff course at the Royal Naval College, Greenwich.

After a three-year stint at Washington D.C., Treacher was appointed executive officer of the ice patrol ship HMS Protector (A146) in May 1956. During his tenure as XO, Protector rescued the passengers and crew of the icebound MV Theron, including Sir Edmund Hillary and Sir Vivian Fuchs. In 1957, he was appointed to the staff of Flag Officer, Flying Training (FOFT) at RNAS Yeovilton (HMS Heron). As staff officer, he was responsible for training of all front-line squadrons. After close to two years in the FOFT staff, he was appointed Commander (Air) of the Illustrious-class aircraft carrier HMS Victorious (R38), joining the ship on 21 May 1959. In March 1961, Treacher was appointed Head of the work-up team of the first aircraft carrier of the Indian Navy, INS Vikrant. He was charged with the introduction of aircraft carrier operations of the Indian Navy.

In September 1962, Treacher was appointed Naval assistant to the Third Sea Lord and Controller of the Navy, Vice Admiral Sir Michael Le Fanu. He served in this appointment for two years, after which he was appointed commanding officer of the Type-12 anti-submarine frigate HMS Lowestoft (F103). During his tenure as CO, Lowestoft transferred to the Far East fleet. In 1966, he led the ship during the Beira Patrol. He was promoted to captain in 1962 and went on to command HMS Eagle.

=== Flag rank ===
Treacher was promoted to the rank of Rear admiral and appointed Flag Officer, Carriers and Amphibious Ships (FOCAS) in July 1970. He served as FOCAS till June 1972, when he took over as Flag Officer Naval Air Command (FONAC). The appointments of Flag Officer, Flying Training and Flag Officer, Air (Home) were merged to form a single entity - FONAC. He was then appointed Vice Chief of the Naval Staff in 1973 and Commander-in-Chief Fleet in 1975. He was appointed Knight Grand Cross of the Order of the Bath in the 1975 Birthday Honours. He was promoted to admiral on 15 December 1975, and retired in March 1977.

== Business career ==
In retirement Treacher became Chief Executive of National Car Parks. He was also Deputy Chairman of Westland Group and a Director of Meggitt. He was named chairman of London's Playboy Club in an attempt to secure a gambling licence that had been denied over concerns regarding his predecessor.

Treacher died in April 2018 at the age of 93.

== Personal life ==
In 1950, Treacher married Patcie McGrath; they had one son and one daughter. After his first marriage was dissolved, he married Kirstie Landale in 1969; they also had one son and one daughter.

== Sources ==
Media related to John Treacher at Wikimedia Commons

- Treacher, Sir John (2004), Life at Full Throttle: From Wardroom to Boardroom, Pen & Sword Maritime, ISBN 978-1844151349
- Thomas, Graham The Story of the Men of the Fleet Air Arm, RAF & Commonwealth Who Defended South Korea 1950–1953, Grubb Street, 2004, ISBN 1-904010-04-0

Military offices
Preceded by Michael Fell	Flag Officer, Carriers and Amphibious Ships; 1970–1972	Succeeded by Raymond Lygo
Preceded by Michael Fell	Flag Officer Naval Air Command; 1972–1973	Succeeded by Peter Austin
Preceded by Sir Terence Lewin	Vice Chief of the Naval Staff; 1973–1975	Succeeded by Sir Raymond Lygo
Preceded by Sir Terence Lewin	Commander-in-Chief Fleet; 1975–1977	Succeeded by Sir Henry Leach
