= Alec Julian Tyndale-Biscoe =

Rear-Admiral Alec Tyndale-Biscoe CB OBE
- Born: 10 August 1906; North Petherton (Bridgwater, Somerset, England
- Died: 26 April 1997 (aged 90)
- Education: Royal Naval Colleges, Osborne; Britannia Royal Naval College
- Military career
- Allegiance: United Kingdom
- Branch: Royal Navy
- Rank: Rear-Admiral

Rear-Admiral Alec Julian Tyndale-Biscoe CB OBE (10 August 1906 – 26 April 1997) was a British naval engineer and a senior officer in the Royal Navy, who played a leading role in the design of HMS Vanguard, the biggest- and last- battleship to be built for the Royal Navy.

== Early life and education ==
Alec Julian Tyndale-Biscoe was born at North Petherton (Bridgwater, Somerset) the elder son (there being also two daughters) of Lt-Col Arthur Annesley Tyndale-Biscoe (1872–1969), of Aubrey House, Keyhaven, near Lymington, Hampshire, formerly of King's Mead, Upper Bognor, West Sussex, and Emily Beatrice (1883–1976), daughter of (Edward) Alexander James Duff. A great-grandfather on his mother's side was Royal Navy Captain George Duff (1764–1805), who fought at the Battle of Trafalgar. The Tyndale family, tracing back to the mid-1600s, were originally of Bathford, Somerset, but by virtue of marriage with the heiress of the Biscoe family were subsequently of Holton Park, Oxfordshire, and entered the ranks of the landed gentry. The Biscoe surname was adopted in the nineteenth century by Lt-Col Arthur Tyndale-Biscoe's grandfather, as a condition of inheritance.

He was educated at the Royal Naval Colleges, Osborne and Dartmouth, and he entered the British Royal Navy in 1920. Specialising as a naval engineer, he served in the navy during and after the Second World War, rising to the rank of captain in 1949 and ending his professional career as a "rear admiral".

== Career ==
Between February 1939 and April 1940, Tyndale-Biscoe was employed at the onshore facility identified as "HMS President" with the "Admiralty Department of the Director Aircraft Maintenance and Repair facility". For nearly three years, until February 1943, he was based near Southampton at "HMS Daedalus", another shore-based facility. During this period, there were several promotions, apparently within the naval engineering staff department.

He played a leading role in the design of the biggest and last battleship to be built for the Royal Navy, HMS Vanguard. Some years later, when UK-based auto manufacturer Standard Motor Company wished to name a new model as the Standard Vanguard, Tyndale-Biscoe was involved in the decision as to whether they should be permitted to do so. With the rank of Rear-Admiral, he was Flag Officer, Reserve Aircraft from 1957 to 1959 (the post of Rear-Admiral, Reserve Aircraft had been abolished in 1956); the Reserve Aircraft sub-command was abolished at the end of Tyndale-Biscoe's tenure, on 17 August 1959, as part of endeavours to concentrate the Fleet Air Arm in the United Kingdom into a smaller number of air stations.

Tyndale-Briscoe was a member, later a fellow, of the Institution of Mechanical Engineers, and fellow of the Royal Aeronautical Society. He was chairman and managing director of Blaw-Knox Ltd, manufacturers of road-paving equipment.

== Personal life ==
Tyndale-Biscoe was married three times. In 1927, he married Rosemary, daughter of Major Charles Morrison; in 1939, he married Emma, daughter of Henry Haselden, of Egypt; in 1974, he married Elsa, daughter of Arthur Gwynne-James. He had a son and daughter from his first marriage, and four daughters from his second. He lived at Brooklands, Wych Cross, Uckfield, Sussex, having previously lived at Woodville House, Arbroath, Angus, Scotland.
