= 3rd Aircraft Carrier Squadron =

Former aircraft carrier formation of the Royal Navy

- White Ensign
- Active: 1948-1952
- Country: United Kingdom
- Allegiance: British Empire
- Branch: Royal Navy
- Type: Squadron

Commanders
- Notable commanders: Admiral of the Fleet Sir Caspar John GCB

The British 3rd Aircraft Carrier Squadron also called Third Aircraft Carrier Squadron was a military formation of Aircraft Carriers of the Royal Navy from January 1948 to July 1952.

== History ==
The 3rd Aircraft Carrier Squadron was established in February 1947 and allocated to the Home Fleet. In December 1952 the squadron was re-designated Heavy Squadron that consisted of a mix of battleships, aircraft carriers and cruisers of the Home fleet. In December 1953 the Flag Officer, Heavy Squadron became Flag Officer, Aircraft Carriers with a responsibility for all the operational carriers. His title and responsibility were later changed to Flag Officer, Carriers and Amphibious Ships in 1968.

== Administration ==
=== Rear-Admiral/Vice-Admiral, Commanding 3rd Aircraft Carrier Squadron ===
Included:

	Rank	Flag	Name	Term	Notes
Rear-Admiral/Vice-Admiral, Commanding 3rd Aircraft Carrier Squadron
1	Rear-Admiral	Rear-Admiral - Royal Navy	Maurice J. Mansergh	July 1948 to September 1949	
2	Vice-Admiral	Vice-Admiral - Royal Navy	Charles E. Lambe	September 1949 to January 1951	
3	Rear-Admiral	Rear-Admiral - Royal Navy	Caspar John	January 1951 to November 1951	then FO Heavy Squadron till July 1952

== Sources ==
- Heathcote, T. A. (2002). British Admirals of the Fleet: 1734–1995. Barnsley, England: Pen and Sword. ISBN 9781473812703.
- Mackie, Colin. "Royal Navy Senior Appointments from 1865" (PDF). gulabin.com. Gordon Mackie, July 2018.
- Watson, Dr Graham. "Royal Navy Organisation and Ship Deployment 1947-2013". www.naval-history.net. Gordon Smith, 12 July 2015.
