= F103 =

F103 may refer to:

- Audi F103, a 1965 internal designation for a series of car models
- Blas de Lezo (F103), a 2004 Spanish Navy Álvaro de Bazán class frigate
- Tamiya F103, a 1/10 scale radio controlled Formula One chassis by Tamiya Corporation
- General Electric F103, a jet engine
- HMS Lowestoft (F103), a British Royal Navy Rothsay class anti-submarine frigate
- Republic XF-103 Thunderwarrior, a cancelled fighter aircraft development project
