= Fifth Sea Lord =

Member of the Board of Admiralty of the Royal Navy

Office of the Fifth Sea Lord
- Ensign of the Royal Navy
- Department of the Admiralty
- Member of: Board of Admiralty
- Reports to: First Sea Lord
- Nominator: First Lord of the Admiralty
- Appointer: Prime Minister; Subject to formal approval by the King-in-Council
- Term length: Not fixed (typically 1–3 years)
- Inaugural holder: Rear Admiral Sir Godfrey Paine
- Formation: 1917–1965

The Fifth Sea Lord was formerly one of the Naval Lords and members of the Board of Admiralty that controlled the Royal Navy. The post's incumbent had responsibility for naval aviation.

== History ==
In 1805, for the first time, specific functions were assigned to each of the 'Naval' Lords, who were described as 'Professional' Lords, leaving to the 'Civil' Lords the routine business of signing documents.

During World War I it was one of four additional naval positions added to the Board of Admiralty to manage the Navy. The only officer to hold the title during the war was Commodore Godfrey Paine. Commodore Paine simultaneously held the title of Director of Naval Aviation. After the Air Force Bill received Royal Assent in November 1917 the Air Council was created on 3 January 1918 which included Paine.

The post of Fifth Sea Lord then lapsed until 1938 when the Admiralty regained responsibility for naval aviation: the post was reestablished and was the Chief of Naval Air Services, responsible for preparation and management of all of the Royal Navy's aircraft and air personnel.

From 1957 to 1965 the Fifth Sea Lord's post was held jointly with the Deputy Chief of the Naval Staff. The post was abolished in 1965.

In the 21st century the Assistant Chief of the Naval Staff (Aviation, Amphibious Capability & Carriers) has a similar role.

== List of Fifth Sea Lords ==
=== Fifth Sea Lords and Chief of Naval Air Service 1917–1918 ===
Included:

- Rear Admiral Sir Godfrey Paine 1917

Note: with the transfer of naval aviation to the Royal Air Force in 1918, the appointment lapsed and was not revived until 1938

=== Fifth Sea Lords 1938–1956 ===
- Admiral Sir Alexander Ramsay 1938–1939
- Vice Admiral Sir Guy Royle 1939–1941
- Rear Admiral Sir Lumley Lyster 1941–1942

Note: the title was in abeyance from 1942 to 1943 although Admiral Sir Frederic Dreyer was Chief of Naval Air Services

- Vice Admiral Sir Denis Boyd 1943–1945
- Rear Admiral Sir Thomas Troubridge 1945–1946
- Admiral Sir Philip Vian 1946–1948
- Vice Admiral Sir George Creasy 1948–1949
- Vice Admiral Sir Maurice Mansergh 1949–1951
- Vice Admiral Sir Edmund Anstice 1951–1954
- Vice Admiral Sir Alexander Bingley 1954–1956

=== Fifth Sea Lords and Deputy Chiefs of the Naval Staff 1957–1965 ===
- Vice Admiral Sir Manley Power 1957–1959
- Admiral Sir Laurence Durlacher 1959–1962
- Vice Admiral Sir Peter Gretton 1962–1963
- Vice Admiral Sir Frank Hopkins 1963–1965

== Admiralty departments and divisions under the Fifth Sea Lord ==
As of 1917

- Air Department
- Air Division

As of 1939

- Air Branch
- Air Materiel Department
- Department of the Director Aircraft Maintenance & Repair
- Department of Air Personnel

As of 1941

- Air Branch
- Naval Air Division (co-responsibility with the Naval Staff)
- Department of the Director Airfield & Carrier Requirements
- Department of the Director of Air Equipment
- Department of the Director Aircraft Maintenance & Repair

As of 1957

- Fleet Air Arm
- Naval Air Warfare Division (co-responsibility with the Naval Staff)
- Naval Air Organisation and Training Division (co-responsibility with the Naval Staff)
- Department of the Director of Air Equipment and Naval Photography
- Department of the Director Aircraft Maintenance & Repair
- Department of the Director Naval Aircraft Development and Production
- Office of the Adviser on Aircraft Accidents

As of 1962

- Fleet Air Arm

== In fiction ==
In the title story of his 1960 short story collection For Your Eyes Only, Ian Fleming wrote that M, James Bond's MI6 superior, gave up a likely appointment as Fifth Sea Lord in order to head the spy agency.

== See also ==
- First Sea Lord
- Second Sea Lord
- Third Sea Lord
- Fourth Sea Lord

== Sources ==
- Naval Staff, Training and Staff Duties Division (1929). The Naval Staff of the Admiralty. Its Work and Development. B.R. 1845 (late C.B. 3013). Copy at The National Archives. ADM 234/434.
