= Rear-Admiral, Reserve Aircraft =

Office of the Rear-Admiral, Reserve Aircraft
- Ensign of the Royal Navy
- Admiralty, Ministry of Defence
- Reports to: Flag Officer, Air (Home)
- Nominator: First Sea Lord
- Appointer: Prime Minister; Subject to formal approval by the Queen-in-Council
- Term length: Not fixed (typically 1–3 years)
- Inaugural holder: Engineer: Rear-Admiral W. S. Jameson
- Formation: January 1949–1956

The Rear-Admiral, Reserve Aircraft also known as Rear-Admiral, (E) Reserve Aircraft was a senior Royal Navy appointment responsible for administering all Naval Air Stations Reserve Aircraft, Aircraft Repair Yards and trials of Aircraft Carriers from 1949 to 1956.

Rear-Admiral, Reserve Aircraft, reported to Flag Officer, Air (Home).

== History ==
The office was established in January 1949 following Vice Admiral Lumley Lyster hauling down his flag as Flag Officer, Carrier Training in 1945. Vice-Admiral Lyster's duties were split up, and the Reserve Aircraft post took some of them. Both incumbents of the Reserve Aircraft post were drawn from the Royal Naval Engineers Branch and held the rank of Engineer Rear-Admiral.

The appointment supervised:

- Administration of Naval Air Stations Reserve Aircraft.
- Administration of Aircraft Repair Yards.
- Administering all trials of Aircraft Carriers.

Rear-Admiral (E): W. S. Jameson was appointed in January 1949 and served until January 1951. Thereafter he handed over to Rear-Admiral (E) Edward Reebeck, who was in post from February 1951 – 1956.

The post was abolished in 1956.
