= 849 Naval Air Squadron =

Inactive flying squadron of the Royal Navy's Fleet Air Arm

- Squadron badge
- Active: 1943–1945; 1952–1978; 1984–2020
- Disbanded: 21 April 2020
- Country: United Kingdom
- Branch: Royal Navy
- Type: Torpedo Bomber Reconnaissance squadron
- Role: Carrier-based: anti-submarine warfare (ASW); anti-surface warfare (ASuW); Carrier-based Airborne Surveillance and Control (ASaC)
- Size: 3 flights
- Part of: Fleet Air Arm
- Mottos: Primus video (Latin for 'The first to see')
- Aircraft: See Aircraft operated section for full list.
- Engagements: World War II: European theatre of World War II; Pacific theatre; Suez Crisis: Operation Musketeer
- Battle honours: Normandy 1944; East Indies 1945; Palembang 1945; Okinawa 1945; Japan 1945

Commanders
- Notable commanders: Lieutenant Commander(A) K.G. Sharp, RN; Lieutenant Commander(A) D.R. Foster, DSO, DSC, RNVR; Lieutenant Commander J.D. Treacher, RN

Insignia
- Squadron Badge Description: Blue, in base two bars wavy white a flash of lightning winged in bend sinister gold and charged with an eye proper (1953)
- Identification Markings: single letters (Avenger); P1A+ (Avenger by January 1945); 370-385 (Avenger June 1945); 301-326 (Skyraider); 410-454 (Skyraider January 1956); 410-454 (Gannet); 760-777, 260-264, 330-333, 070-074 & 031-040 (Gannet January 1965); 363-370 (Sea King); 180-187 (Sea King September 1985); 180-192 (Sea King January 2007)
- Fin Carrier/Shore Codes: P (Avenger June 1945); CW:J:Z:O (Skyraider); CU:E:R:B:A:V (Skyraider January 1956); CU:BY:R:V:H:E:CU (Gannet); BY:LM, V:H, H:BY, E & R (Gannet January 1965); CU:R:N:L (Sea King January 2007)

849 Naval Air Squadron (849 NAS), also referred to as 849 Squadron, is an inactive Fleet Air Arm (FAA) naval air squadron of the United Kingdom’s Royal Navy (RN). It most recently operated the Merlin HM2 from February until April 2020.

It was formed during the Second World War as an aircraft carrier based torpedo-bomber, unit, flying missions against Japanese targets in the Far East. Its service since the Second World War has been as an airborne early warning squadron, flying fixed winged Douglas Skyraiders and Fairey Gannets from the Royal Navy's fixed wing carriers from 1952 until 1978, and airborne early warning Westland Sea King helicopters from 1982 to 2018.

== History ==
=== World War two ===
849 Naval Air Squadron was established in September 1943 at RNAS Quonset Point (HMS Saker II) located at Naval Air Station Quonset Point, Rhode Island, United States which had been loaned to the Admiralty from October 1942. It was equipped with twelve Grumman Avenger Mk.I torpedo bombers. The squadron moved to RN Air Section Squantum the following month, located at Naval Air Station Squantum, Massachusetts, which from September 1943 had also been loaned to the Admiralty.

The squadron moved to RN Air Section Norfolk in November, located at Naval Air Station Norfolk, Virginia, where lodger facilities for FAA squadrons and an Air Section were granted to the Admiralty. The twelve Grumman Avengers of the 849 squadron were carefully loaded and stored in the hangar of the Ruler-class escort carrier, HMS Khedive. Upon completion of the loading process, HMS Khedive departed for New York to join convoy UT.4a, which left New York on 15 November, as part of Convoy UT.4a and reached the Clyde on 15 November; subsequently, HMS Khedive continued to Liverpoolthe next day to unload. On the 17 November, the aircraft were craned off to the quay side and subsequently towed to the RN Air Section at RAF Speke.

The squadron underwent a duration of training at RNAS Grimsetter (HMS Robin), located in Mainland, Orkney. This was succeeded by a two-week anti-submarine course at RNAS Maydown (HMS Shrike), situated in County Londonderry, followed by an additional five weeks of training in this role at RNAS Eglinton (HMS Gannet), also in County Londonderry. In April 1944, 849 Squadron relocated to RAF Perranporth in Cornwall, where it operated in conjunction with 816 Squadron, utilising Fairey Swordfish aircraft, and 850 Squadron, employing Grumman Avenger aircraft. It provided anti-surface vessel and anti-submarine patrols over the English Channel prior to and during the D-Day operations.

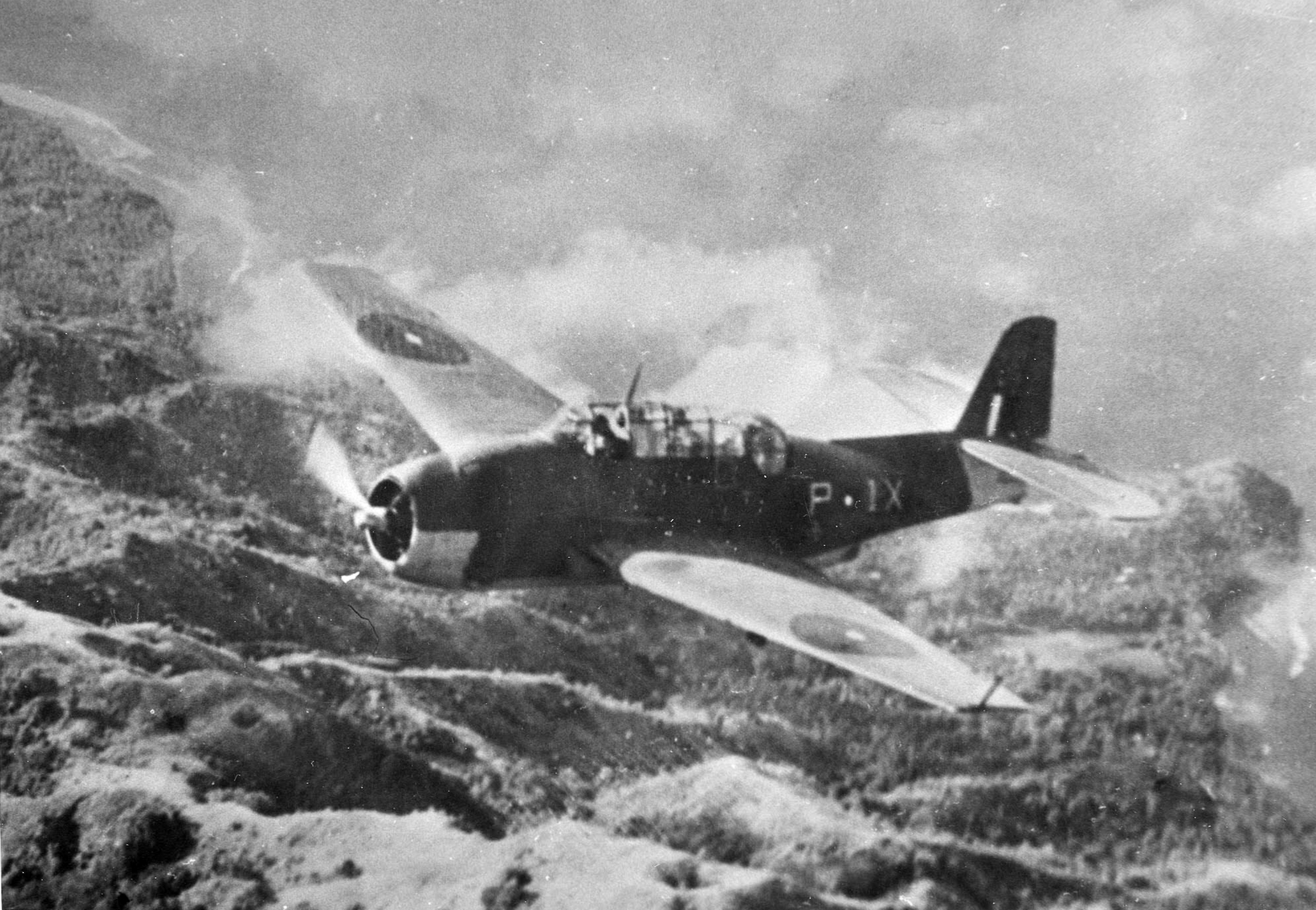
A Grumman Avenger from 849 NAS in flight, 1944.

In August 1944, it was sent to Ceylon to join the British Eastern Fleet. On 9 September, the Ruler-class escort carrier HMS Rajah took on board the personnel and twelve Grumman Avenger aircraft from 849 Squadron, destined for southern India and Ceylon. The carrier departed on 10 September; she made stops at Gibraltar, Alexandria, and Aden before arriving in Cochin, India on 9 October. Here 849 Squadron disembarked for the Royal Navy Aircraft Repair Yard located in Coimbatore, HMS Garuda.

It embarked on HMS Victorious (which became part of the British Pacific Fleet in November 1944). It took part in Operation Lentil against oil installations at Pangkalan Brandan in Sumatra on 4 January 1945, and in the larger carrier strikes against the oil refineries at Palembang Sumatra (Operation Meridian) on 24 and 29 January.

Victorious, including 849 in its Carrier Air Group, took part in operations in support of the American invasion of Okinawa from March to May 1945, flying strikes against airfields used by Japanese Kamikaze aircraft on the Sakishima Islands and on Formosa. Still aboard Victorious, No. 849 took place in raids against the Japanese Home islands in July and August, including the bombing raids on 24 July that resulted in severe damage to the Japanese escort carrier Kaiyo. It disbanded on 31 October 1945.

=== Skyraider AEW.1 (1952-1960) ===
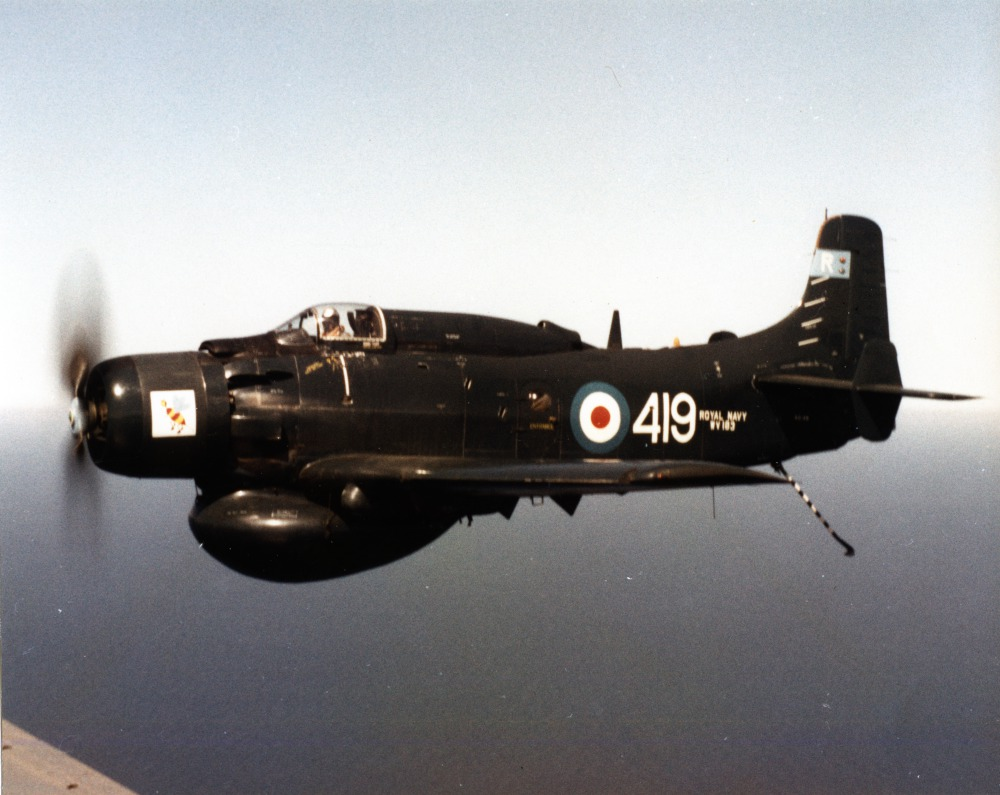
Douglas Skyraider AEW.1, 849 Squadron 'B' Flight HMS Ark Royal

849 Naval Air Squadron was re-established at RNAS Culdrose (HMS Seahawk), located in Cornwall, England, on 7 July 1952, serving as the Airborne Early Warning squadron, following the redesignation of 778 Naval Air Squadron. The squadron was equipped with the Douglas Skyraider, an American single-seat attack aircraft. However, the aircraft utilised were the AD-4W variant, a three-seat airborne early warning model, which the Royal Navy obtained through the Mutual Defense Assistance Act and designated AEW.1 by the FAA. These aircraft were fitted with advanced radar systems to deliver early warnings to the Fleet regarding potential attacks from ships and low-flying aircraft, and the squadron was commanded by Lieutenant Commander J.D. Treacher, RN. The Headquarters Flight provided training for aircrew members prior to their assignment to operational Flights, which periodically embarked in the fleet carriers.

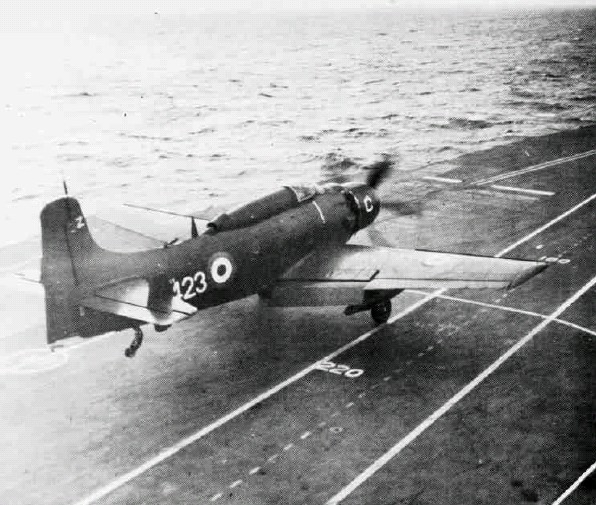
849 Squadron Douglas Skyraider AEW.1 taking off from HMS Albion

In November 1952, both 'A' and 'B' Flights were established, with 'A' Flight being the first to set sail aboard the Audacious-class aircraft carrier HMS Eagle in January 1953. Subsequently, 'B' Flight departed for RNAS Hal Far (HMS Falcon) in Malta during the same month. By June, the newly constituted 'C' Flight joined 'A' Flight on HMS Eagle, disembarking in October to embark on the Colossus-class aircraft carrier HMS Glory to Malta, where it took over from 'B' Flight. In August 1953, 'D' Flight was formed and spent two weeks aboard HMS Eagle in November. The formation of 'E' Flight occurred in January 1954, while 'B' Flight re-embarked on HMS Eagle, only to disband in July to bolster 'A' and 'C' Flights. 'C' Flight was promptly re-designated as the new 'B' Flight, while 'D' Flight transitioned into the new 'C' Flight, joining HMS Eagles sister ship HMS Ark Royal in August. To finalise this intricate series of transitions, a new 'D' Flight was established in October.

In May 1955, 'C' Flight was briefly in HMS Bulwark, and in October 'B' Flight embarked in HMS Ark Royal. In January 1956, 'D' Flight joined HMS Albion, leaving again in May, and in June 'C' Flight spent another short period in HMS Albion. 'A' Flight, still serving in HMS Eagle, took part in the Suez operation in November 1956, flying continuous barrier patrols around the Fleet and Egyptian coast, during which they located two E-boats that were subsequently destroyed. 'D' Flight next embarked in June 1957, when it joined HMS Bulwark. During 1958, 'B' Flight transferred from HMS Ark Royal to HMS Victorious, whilst 'D' Flight left HMS Bulwark. In 1959, 'A' Flight disembarked from HMS Eagle, 'C' Flight left HMS Albion and 'D' Flight spent a few months in HMS Centaur.

=== Gannet (1959-1978) ===
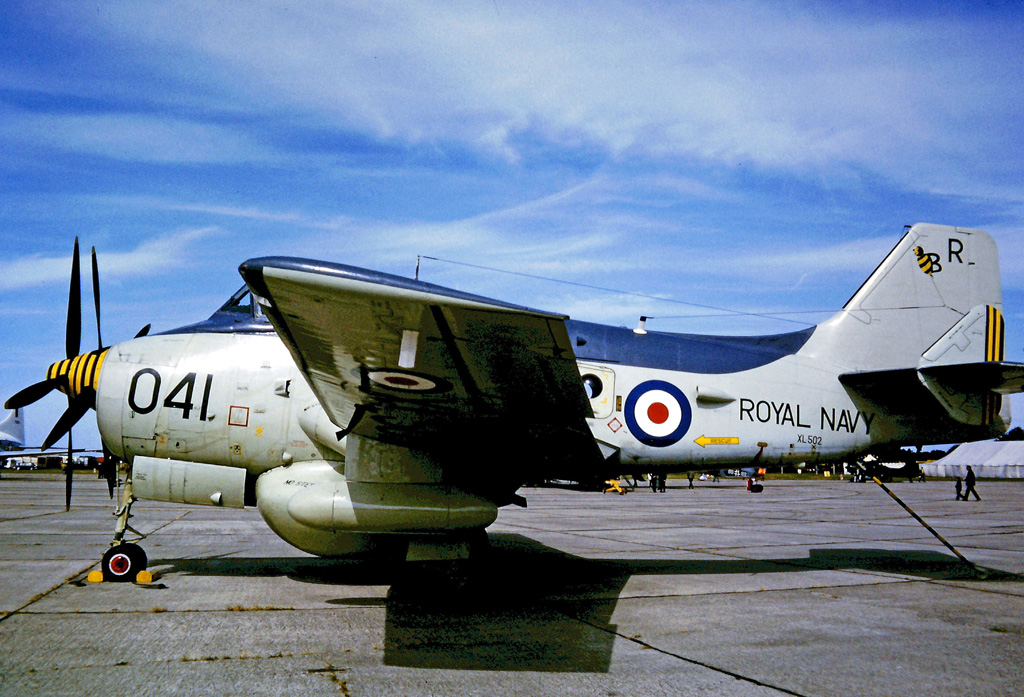
Fairey Gannet AEW.3 of 849 Squadron's 'B' Flight wearing the 'R' code of HMS Ark Royal in 1973

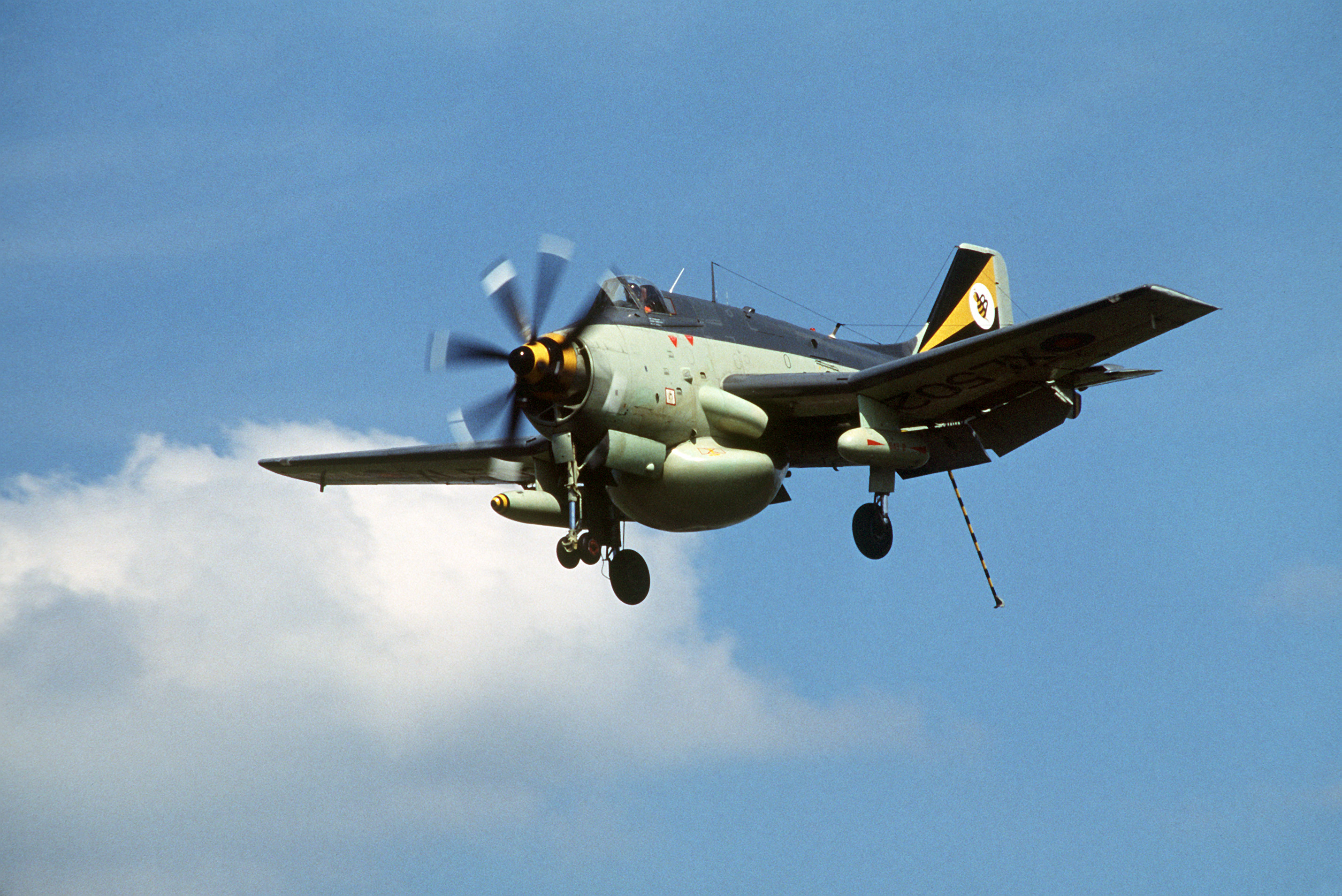
A Fairey Gannet AEW.3 of 849 Squadron

Following the retirement of the Skyraiders in December 1960, the unit flew the Fairey Gannet AEW.3 in the same role, operating from HMS Eagle, HMS Ark Royal, HMS Centaur, HMS Hermes and HMS Victorious. Fairey Gannet variants AS.4, COD.4 and T.5s were also operated in supporting roles. The squadron detachments continued as 849B for HMS Ark Royal and 849HQ stationed at RNAS Lossiemouth (HMS Fulmar), Moray, until the squadron disbanded again on 15 December 1978.

In November 1970 Bristol Belle, one of the first hot air balloons to fly in UK, was piloted by Lt Terry Adams, accompanied by Lt Howard Draper both of 849 Squadron B Flight (Gannets). This early morning launch carried mail into Malta whilst the Ark Royal was steaming off the southern coast of that island.

=== Sea King (1984-2018) ===
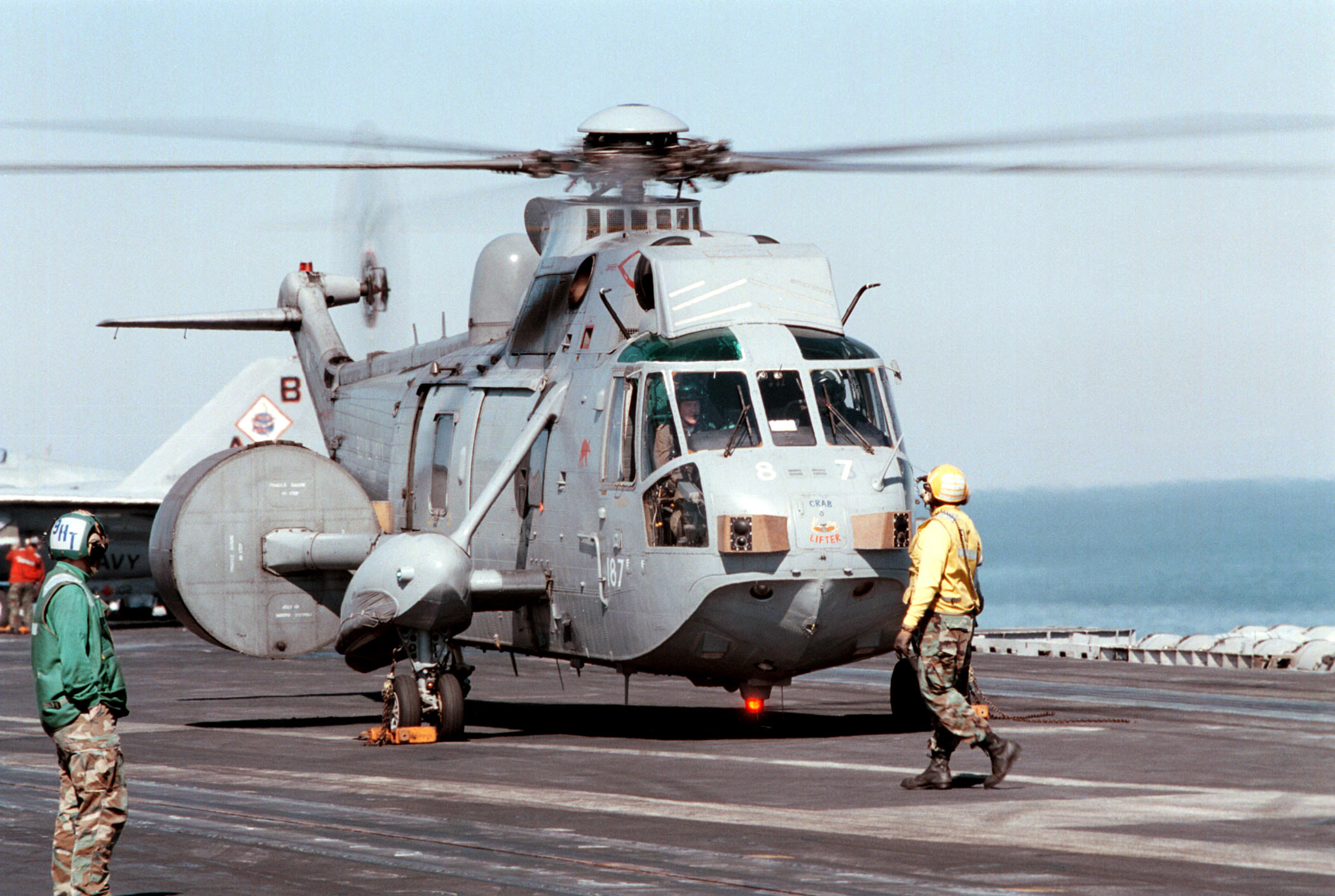
An 849 Squadron Sea King AEW.2A on the USS George Washington, 1988

It reformed after the lessons of the 1982 South Atlantic campaign had been learned, on 8 November 1984 and the unit then operated the Westland Sea King Mk7 Airborne Surveillance and Control (ASaC) helicopter. The squadron was stationed at RNAS Culdrose in Cornwall, operating 9 aircraft. It was divided into three elements - two flights (A and B), or Aardvarks and Bees and the Operational Conversion Unit (OCU)(Previously known as HQ). Historically, a Flight was assigned to each of the two active aircraft carriers in the Royal Navy. The squadron suffered heavy losses during the 2003 invasion of Iraq when two of its aircraft operating from HMS Ark Royal collided during low visibility conditions. Six squadron members and an American exchange officer were killed in the collision.

On 13 December 2006, after a short ceremony at RNAS Culdrose, A Flight became 854 Squadron and B Flight became 857 Squadron, taking the former's Sea King ASaC.7 with them.

In May 2014, the MOD announced that seven ASaC.7 helicopters, to be operated by 849 Naval Air Squadron, would remain in service with the RN through to the second half of 2018; the remainder of the Royal Navy's Sea Kings, of all types, were to be withdrawn by 2016.

854 and 857 Naval Air Squadrons were reabsorbed by 849 Naval Air Squadron in 2015, to form 'Normandy' and 'Palembang' flights respectively. The third flight in 849 NAS is 'Okinawa Flight'.

=== Decommissioning ===
849NAS briefly operated a single Augusta Westland Merlin HM Mk2 from February 2020 in anticipation of the Mk2 receiving the Crowsnest upgraded ASaC system. 849 NAS decommissioned on 21 April 2020.

== Aircraft operated ==
The squadron operated a variety of different aircraft and versions:

- Grumman Avenger Mk.I torpedo bomber (August 1943 - August 1945)
- Grumman Avenger Mk.II torpedo bomber (September 1944 - August 1945)
- Douglas Skyraider AEW.1 airborne early warning aircraft (July 1952 - December 1960)
- Fairey Gannet AS.4 anti-submarine warfare aircraft (September 1959 - May 1966)
- Fairey Gannet AEW.3 airborne early warning aircraft (February 1960 - December 1978)
- Fairey Gannet COD.4 carrier onboard delivery aircraft (September 1961 - September 1974)
- Fairey Gannet T.5 dual control trainer aircraft (September 1961 - January 1976)
- Westland Sea King AEW.2 airborne early warning helicopter (November 1984 - June 2003)
- Westland Sea King HAS.6 anti-submarine warfare helicopter (January 1996 - May 2004)
- Westland Sea King HAS.5 anti-submarine warfare helicopter (May 1996 - August 2001)
- Westland Sea King ASaC.7 airborne surveillance and control helicopter (March 2002 - September 2018)
- AgustaWestland Merlin HM2 anti-submarine warfare helicopter (? - April 2020)

== Battle honours ==
The following Battle Honours have been awarded to 849 Naval Air Squadron:

- Normandy 1944
- East Indies 1945
- Palembang 1945
- Okinawa 1945
- Japan 1945

== Assignments ==
849 Naval Air Squadron was assigned as needed to form part of a number of larger units:

- 1st Carrier Air Group (30 June - 8 September 1945)

== Naval air stations and aircraft carriers ==
849 Naval Air Squadron was active at various naval air stations of the Royal Navy and Royal Air Force stations, both within the United Kingdom and internationally. Additionally, it operated from several Royal Navy fleet and escort carriers, as well as other airbases located abroad.

=== World War Two air stations and aircraft carriers ===
List of air stations and aircraft carriers used by 849 Naval Air Squadron during World War two including dates:

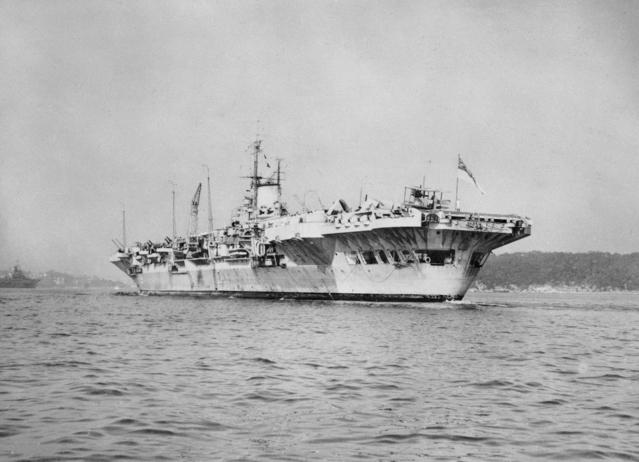
HMS Victorious arriving in Sydney in February 1945

- Royal Naval Air Station Quonset Point (HMS Saker II), Rhode Island, (1 - 16 August 1943)
- RN Air Section Squantum, Quincy, Massachusetts, (16 August - 30 October 1943)
  - RN Air Section Norfolk, Virginia, (Detachment - Deck Landing Practice (DLP) 20 - 24 September 1943)
- RN Air Section Norfolk, Virginia, (30 October - 1 November 1943)
- HMS Khedive (1 - 17 November 1943)
- RN Air Section Speke, Merseyside, (17 - 25 November 1943)
- Royal Naval Air Station Grimsetter (HMS Robin), Mainland, Orkney, (25 November 1943 - 14 February 1944)
- Royal Naval Air Station Maydown (HMS Shrike), County Londonderry, (14 - 26 February 1944)
- Royal Naval Air Station Eglinton (HMS Gannet), County Londonderry, (26 February - 25 March 1944)
- Royal Naval Air Station Machrihanish (HMS Landrail), Argyll and Bute, (25 March - 20 April 1944)
- Royal Air Force Perranporth, Cornwall, (20 April - 9 August 1944)
- Royal Air Force St Eval, Cornwall, (9 - 26 August 1944)
- Royal Naval Air Station Lee-on-Solent (HMS Daedalus), Hampshire, (26 August - 6 September 1944)
- Royal Naval Air Station Belfast (HMS Gadwall), County Antrim, (6 - September 1944)
- HMS Rajah (9 September - 9 October 1944)
- Royal Naval Air Station Coimbatore (HMS Garuda), India, (9 - 11 October 1944)
- Royal Naval Air Station Karukurunda (HMS Ukussa), Ceylon, (11 October - 19 December 1944)
  - HMS Battler (Detachment thirteen aircraft - Deck Landing Training (DLT) 4 - 6 November 1944)
- HMS Victorious (19 December 1944 - 10 February 1945)
- Royal Naval Air Station Nowra (HMS Nabbington), New South Wales, (10 - 27 February 1945)
- HMS Victorious (27 February - 6 June 1945)
- Royal Naval Air Station Nowra (HMS Nabbington), New South Wales, (6 - 24 June 1945)
- HMS Victorious (24 June - 23 September 1945)
- Royal Naval Air Station Maryborough (HMS Nabstock), Queensland, (23 - 24 September 1945)
- Sydney, New South Wales, (24 September 1945)
- HMS Victorious (crews) (24 September - 31 October 1945)
- disbanded UK - (31 October 1945)

== Commanding officers ==
List of commanding officers of 849 Naval Air Squadron:

1943 - 1945

- Lieutenant Commander(A) K.G. Sharp, RN, from 1 September 1943
- Lieutenant Commander(A) D.R. Foster, DSO, DSC, RNVR, from 5 September 1944
- Lieutenant Commander A.J. Griffith, DSC, RNVR, from 14 June 1945
- disbanded - 31 October 1945

1952 - 1978

- Lieutenant Commander J.D. Treacher, RN, from 7 July 1952
- Lieutenant Commander M.J. Baring, RN, from 20 July 1953
- Lieutenant Commander C.B. Armstrong, RN, from 18 December 1954
- Lieutenant Commander D.H. Frazer, RN, from 1 May 1956
- Lieutenant Commander F. Bromilow, RN, from 13 May 1957
- Lieutenant Commander A.G.B. Phillip, RN, from 9 April 1959
- Lieutenant Commander W. Hawley, RN, from 8 December 1960
- Lieutenant Commander J.F. McGrail, RN, from 7 February 1962
- Lieutenant Commander W.H. Barnard, RN, from 17 May 1963
- Lieutenant Commander M.J.F Rawlinson, RN, from 4 January 1965
- Lieutenant Commander A.W. Roberts, RN, from 1 September 1966
- Lieutenant Commander B. Prideaux, RN, from 7 February 1968
- Lieutenant Commander R.M. Scott, RN, from 2 May 1969
- Lieutenant Commander J.E. Nash, RN, from 4 September 1970
- Commander T. Goetz, RN, from 11 September 1972
- Commander A.J. Light, RN, from 17 April 1974 (KiFA 3 June 1974)
- Lieutenant Commander P.M. Jones, RN, from 4 June 1974
- Commander G.J.L. Holman, RN, from 21 September 1974
- Commander T.G. Maltby, RN, from 20 September 1976
- disbanded - 15 December 1978

1984 - 2018

- Lieutenant Commander P.M. Flutter, AFC, RN, from 1 November 1984
- Lieutenant Commander P.J. Howarth, RN, from 9 April 1987
- Lieutenant Commander N.A.M. Butler, RN, from 19 July 1989
- Lieutenant Commander S.B. Phillips, RN, from 30 March 1990
- Lieutenant Commander M.D. Wells, RN, from 5 June 1992
- Lieutenant Commander J.N. Saunders, MBE, RN, from 21 October 1994
- Lieutenant Commander J.G. Rich, RN, from 30 October 1996
- Lieutenant Commander A.M. O'Sullivan, RN, from 28 September 1998
- Lieutenant Commander G.B. Hutchinson, RN, from 10 October 2000
- Lieutenant Commander B.R. Meakin, RN, from 4 September 2002 (Commander 30 June 2003)
- Commander M.A.J. Hawkins, RN, from 3 December 2004
- Lieutenant Commander P.J. Douglas, RN, from 8 December 2007
- Lieutenant Commander M.J. Barlow, RN, from 26 September 2008
- Lieutenant Commander C. Trubshaw, RN, from 10 December 2010
- Lieutenant Commander A.D. Rose, RN, from 13 July 2012 (Commander 8 April 2013)
- Lieutenant Commander C.S. McGannity, RN, from 6 June 2013
- Commander R.J. Kennedy, RN, from 4 December 2014
- Lieutenant Commander C.B. Hughes, RN, from 27 July 2016

Note: Abbreviation (A) signifies Air Branch of the RN or RNVR.

== See also ==
- List of Fleet Air Arm groups
- Charles Gidley Wheeler 849 Squadron Senior Pilot, 1969-1970
- Exercise Strikeback
