= Walter Couchman =

Royal Navy officer (1905–1981)

Admiral Sir Walter Couchman KCB CVO DSO OBE
- Born: 19 March 1905; Madras, India
- Died: 2 May 1981 (aged 76); Sudbury, England
- Military career
- Allegiance: United Kingdom
- Branch: Royal Navy
- Service years: 1918–1960
- Rank: Admiral
- Commands: Vice Chief of the Naval Staff (1960); Flag Officer, Air (Home) (1957–60); HMS Glory (1946); HMS Broke (1941–42); HMS Veteran (1940–41)
- Conflicts: Second World War
- Awards: Knight Commander of the Order of the Bath; Commander of the Royal Victorian Order; Distinguished Service Order; Officer of the Order of the British Empire

Admiral Sir Walter Thomas Couchman, KCB, CVO, DSO, OBE (19 March 1905 – 2 May 1981) was a Royal Navy officer who served as Vice Chief of the Naval Staff from February to November 1960, when he retired from service.

== Early life ==
The son of Malcolm Edward Couchman, a civil servant in British India, and Emily Elizabeth Ranking, Walter Couchman was born in Madras in 1905. Educated at the Royal Naval College, Osborne, and Royal Naval College, Dartmouth, Couchman joined the Royal Navy and specialized in naval aviation.

== Naval career ==
Couchman attended staff college at the Royal Naval College, Greenwich in 1928 and qualified as a naval pilot in 1935.

He served in the Second World War as Commander in the Air Materials Division and then as Commanding Officer of the destroyer HMS Veteran. In 1941 he was appointed Staff Officer (Plans) for the Mediterranean Fleet. Later in the War he became Naval Assistant (Underwater Weapons) and then Chief Staff Officer to the Flag Officer Air (Home).

After the War he became Captain of the aircraft carrier HMS Glory and then, from 1947, Director of Naval Air Organisation and Training at the Admiralty.

He went on to be Flag Officer, Flying Training in 1951, in which role he led the Fleet Air Arm flypast of 327 aircraft at the Coronation review of the fleet, flying a de Havilland Sea Vampire. He was then appointed Flag Officer, Heavy Squadron in 1953, Flag Officer, Aircraft Carriers in 1954 and Deputy Controller of Supplies (Air) at the Ministry of Supply in 1955. He became Flag Officer, Air (Home) in 1957 and Vice Chief of the Naval Staff in 1960. He stepped down in November 1960, and formally retired from the Royal Navy in March 1961.

== Family ==
He married Phyllida Connellan; they had a son and two daughters. Following the dissolution of his first marriage, he married Hughe Thelma Hunter Blair née Reid in 1965. After the death of Hughe in 1972, he married Daphne Harvey, the widow of a naval captain.

Military offices
| Preceded by Sir Caspar John | Vice Chief of the Naval Staff; 1960 | Succeeded by Sir Varyl Begg |
