= Maurice Mansergh =

Royal Navy Admiral (1896–1966)

Admiral Sir Maurice Mansergh KCB CBE
- Born: Maurice James Mansergh; 14 October 1896; Ealing, Essex, England
- Died: 29 September 1966 (aged 69); London, England
- Military career
- Allegiance: United Kingdom
- Branch: Royal Navy
- Service years: 1914–1954
- Rank: Admiral
- Commands: HMS Gambia; 15th Cruiser Squadron; 3rd Aircraft Carrier Squadron; Plymouth Command
- Conflicts: World War I World War II
- Awards: Knight Commander of the Order of the Bath; Commander of the Order of the British Empire

Admiral Sir Maurice James Mansergh KCB CBE (14 October 1896 – 29 September 1966) was a Royal Navy officer who went on to be Commander-in-Chief, Plymouth.

== Early life and education ==
Mansergh was born in Ealing, Essex, the second son of civil engineer Ernest Lawson Mansergh and grandson of James Mansergh. He was educated at a school near Nuneaton before entering Royal Naval College, Osborne in 1909 as a naval cadet.

== Naval career ==
Mansergh joined the Royal Navy in 1914 at the start of World War I. He served on the staff of the Commander-in-Chief, Mediterranean Fleet from 1934 and then became executive officer on the battleship HMS Rodney from 1936. In 1939 he became director of the Trade Division at the Admiralty where his main role was the protection of shipping.

He served in World War II as deputy assistant chief of the Naval Staff (Trade) and then, from 1941, as captain of the cruiser HMS Gambia. He was made deputy chief of staff and subsequently chief of staff to the Allied naval commander-in-chief for the Normandy Invasion Expeditionary Force in 1943.

After the war, he became commodore commanding 15th Cruiser Squadron and then, from 1946, he became Naval Secretary. He was appointed commander of the 3rd Aircraft Carrier Squadron in 1948 and Fifth Sea Lord and Deputy Chief of Naval Staff (Air) in 1949, with promotion to vice admiral on 30 September 1949. His last appointment was as Commander-in-Chief, Plymouth in 1951. He retired in 1954.

Military offices
Preceded by Claud Barry	Naval Secretary; 1946–1948	Succeeded by Peveril William-Powlett
Preceded by Sir George Creasy	Fifth Sea Lord; 1949–1951	Succeeded by Sir Edmund Anstice
Preceded by Sir Rhoderick McGrigor	Commander-in-Chief, Plymouth; 1951–1953	Succeeded by Sir Alexander Madden
