= Edmund Anstice =

Royal Navy Vice Admiral (1899–1979)

Vice-Admiral Sir Edmund Anstice KCB
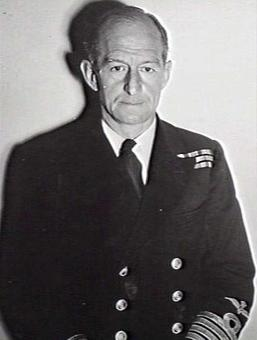
- Captain Edmund Anstice in 1947
- Born: 5 May 1899
- Died: 30 August 1979 (aged 80); Dunning, Scotland
- Military career
- Allegiance: United Kingdom
- Branch: Royal Navy
- Rank: Vice-Admiral
- Commands: Royal Naval Air Station Lee-on-Solent (1945–46); HMS Fencer (1942–44); HMS Striker (1942); No. 463 Flight FAA (1930–32); No. 464 Flight FAA (1927–29)
- Conflicts: First World War; Second World War
- Awards: Knight Commander of the Order of the Bath

Vice-Admiral Sir Edmund Walter Anstice, KCB (5 May 1899 – 30 August 1979) was a senior Royal Navy officer and aviator who served as Fifth Sea Lord from 1951 to 1954.

== Early life and training ==
The second son of Major John Christian Appold Anstice, he joined the Royal Navy in August 1914, and was trained at the Royal Naval Colleges at Osborne and Dartmouth before seeing service in the First World War. He was commissioned as a sub-lieutenant on 15 January 1918. In 1919 he was stationed at HMS President while attending a course at Cambridge University, receiving promotion to lieutenant on 15 February 1920.

== Naval career ==
=== Naval aviator ===
On attachment to the Fleet Air Arm of the Royal Air Force (RAF; all naval aviation being under the control of the RAF at that time), he attended No. 1 Flying Training School at Netheravon, Wiltshire, from June 1924 until January 1925, before being posted to No. 462 Flight, Fleet Air Arm, aboard the aircraft carrier HMS Furious in the Atlantic Fleet, receiving the RAF rank of flight lieutenant on 1 July 1927. On 1 September he became Flight Commander of No. 464 Flight, Fleet Air Arm, aboard the carrier HMS Courageous. He was promoted to lieutenant commander on 15 February 1928 and, in October 1929, transferred to the battlecruiser HMS Renown.

Anstice returned to Courageous in November 1930 to serve as Flight Commander of No. 463 Flight for the next two years. He was promoted to Navy commander on 31 December 1932, and to the RAF rank of squadron leader on 1 January 1933, and from 26 September was attached to the Directorate of Training at the Air Ministry. On 19 June 1936 he returned to Courageous once more, this time as Senior FAA Officer and Squadron Aviation Officer, receiving promotion to wing commander on 1 July. On 28 July 1937 he was appointed Executive Officer of the heavy cruiser HMS Shropshire in the Mediterranean Fleet, remaining there until receiving promotion to the rank of captain on 30 June 1939.

=== Second World War ===
Anstice spent the early part of the Second World War, from October 1939, serving at the Admiralty, and was appointed Deputy Director of the Naval Air Division in February 1941. He returned to sea duty in August 1942 serving briefly as Commanding Officer of the escort carrier HMS Striker, before taking command of HMS Fencer until 19 January 1944. In March he returned to shore duty at HMS Monck, the Combined Training Headquarters at Largs, Ayrshire, where he served as Chief of Staff for Aircraft Carrier Training.

=== Post-war flag officer ===
Anstice was appointed Commanding Officer of Royal Naval Air Station Lee-on-Solent as a commodore (2nd class) on 30 October 1945.

In November 1946 he was appointed Director of Naval Aviation Planning for the Royal Australian Navy, and in October 1947 as appointed to the newly created post of Fourth Member of the Australian Commonwealth Naval Board to advise the board on all matters related to naval aviation.

Promoted on 10 July 1948 to rear admiral, he served as Flag Officer of the Training Squadron, then from 26 August 1949 as Flag Officer, Flying Training based at RNAS Donibristle (HMS Merlin). He was made a Companion of the Order of the Bath in the 1950 New Year Honours and, promoted to vice admiral on 15 September 1951, he served on the Board of Admiralty as Fifth Sea Lord and Deputy Chief of Naval Staff (Air). Anstice was appointed a Knight Commander of the Order of the Bath in the 1953 Coronation Honours, and retired from the Navy on 16 September 1954.

== Personal life ==
In 1928 Anstice married Lesley Ritchie of Sydney, Australia. They had two sons. He lived at Inverdunning House in Dunning in Perthshire. Anstice died on 30 August 1979.

Military offices
Preceded by Sir Maurice Mansergh	Fifth Sea Lord; 1951–1954	Succeeded by Sir Alexander Bingley
