= Peter Herbert (Royal Navy officer) =

Royal Navy Admiral (1929–2019)

Admiral Sir Peter Herbert KCB OBE
- Born: 28 February 1929
- Died: 3 May 2019 (aged 90)
- Military career
- Allegiance: United Kingdom
- Branch: Royal Navy
- Service years: 1949–1984
- Rank: Admiral
- Commands: Vice-Chief of the Defence Staff; Flag Officer Submarines; Flag Officer, Carriers and Amphibious Ships; Director-General, Naval Manpower and Training; HMS Blake; HMS Valiant
- Conflicts: Falklands War
- Awards: Knight Commander of the Order of the Bath; Officer of the Order of the British Empire

Admiral Sir Peter Geoffrey Marshall Herbert, KCB, OBE (28 February 1929 – 3 May 2019) was a senior Royal Navy officer and former Vice-Chief of the Defence Staff.

== Naval career ==
Educated at Dunchurch Hall and the Britannia Royal Naval College, Herbert was commissioned into the Royal Navy in 1949. He served in submarines for much of his early career and then became commander of the nuclear-powered submarine, HMS Valiant, in 1963.

He was made commanding officer of the cruiser HMS Blake in 1974, and then deputy chief of the Polaris Executive in 1976. He went on to be flag officer, carriers and amphibious ships in 1978 and director-general, naval manpower and training in 1980.

He was appointed flag officer submarines and commander, submarines, Eastern Atlantic Area in 1981 and in that role took part in the Falklands War. He was promoted to full admiral on 10 June 1983, and became vice-chief of the defence staff the same year.

In retirement he became a non-executive director of Radamec Group plc.

He died on 3 May 2019 at the age of 90.

== Family ==
In 1953, he married Anne Maureen McKeown (died 11 January 2012) and they went on to have one son and one daughter.

Military offices
Preceded by William Staveley	Flag Officer Carriers and Amphibious Ships; 1978–1979	Succeeded by Position abolished
Preceded by Robert Squires	Flag Officer Submarines; 1981–1983	Succeeded by Sir John Woodward
Preceded by Sir David Evans	Vice-Chief of the Defence Staff; 1983–1984	Succeeded by Sir Peter Harding
