= Richard Bell Davies =

British naval aviator and VC winner

Vice-Admiral Richard Bell Davies VC CB DSO AFC
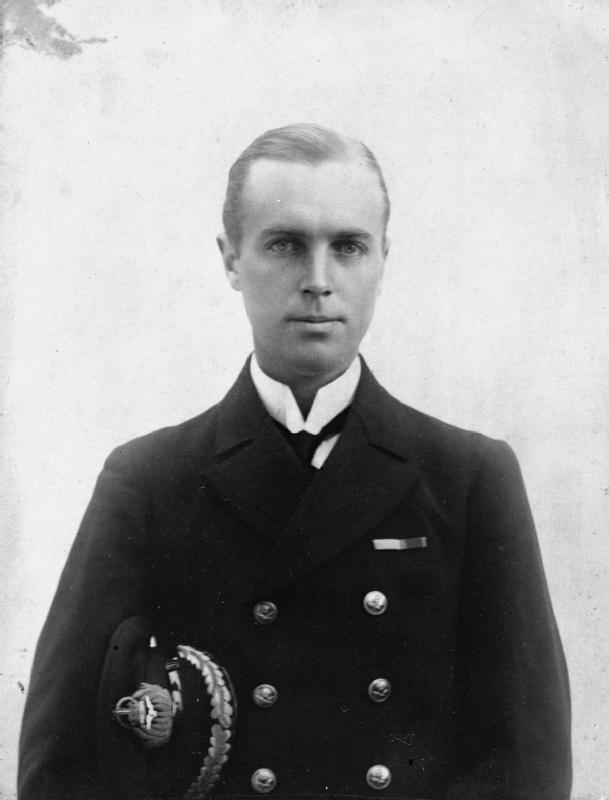
- Richard Bell Davies during the First World War, c. 1916–18
- Born: 19 May 1886; Kensington, London
- Died: 26 February 1966 (aged 79); RNH Haslar, Portsmouth
- Military career
- Allegiance: United Kingdom
- Branch: Royal Navy
- Service years: 1901–1944
- Rank: Vice-Admiral
- Commands: HMS Pretoria Castle (1943–44); HMS Dasher (1942); Rear Admiral, Naval Air Stations (1939–41); HMS Cornwall (1933–35); HMS London (1929–30); No. 3 Squadron RNAS (1915)
- Conflicts: First World War: Western Front; Gallipoli campaign; Second World War
- Awards: Victoria Cross; Companion of the Order of the Bath; Distinguished Service Order; Air Force Cross; Mentioned in Despatches; Knight of the Legion of Honour (France); Croix de guerre (France); Order of Michael the Brave (Rumania)

Vice-Admiral Richard Bell Davies, VC, CB, DSO, AFC (19 May 1886 – 26 February 1966), also known as Richard Bell-Davies, was a senior Royal Navy commander, naval aviator, and a First World War recipient of the Victoria Cross, the highest award for gallantry in the face of the enemy that can be awarded to British and Commonwealth forces.

== Early life and career ==
Born in Kensington, London, Davies was orphaned by the age of five and was brought up by an uncle, a doctor. He attended Bradfield College in Berkshire between September 1899 and April 1901. Davies enlisted in the Royal Navy in 1901 joining HMS Britannia, and on 15 September 1902 was posted as a naval cadet to the protected cruiser HMS Diana, serving with the Mediterranean Fleet. In 1910 he took private flying lessons, and in 1913 he was accepted into the Royal Naval Air Service (RNAS) and was appointed a squadron commander.

== First World War ==
=== Distinguished Service Order ===
In the early days of the war, Davies and Richard Peirse carried out a number of raids on German submarine bases at Ostend and Zeebrugge. Both were awarded the DSO:

For services rendered in the aerial attack on Dunkirk, 23rd January, 1915:—

Squadron Commander Richard Bell Davies
Flight Lieutenant Richard Edmund Charles Peirse

These Officers have repeatedly attacked the German submarine station at Ostend and Zeebrugge, being subjected on each occasion to heavy and accurate fire, their machines being frequently hit. In particular, on 23rd January, they each discharged eight bombs in an attack upon submarines alongside the mole at Zeebrugge, flying down to close range. At the outset of this flight Lieutenant Davies was severely wounded by a bullet in the thigh, but nevertheless he accomplished his task, handling his machine for an hour with great skill in spite of pain and loss of blood.

=== Victoria Cross ===
Davies was then posted to the Dardanelles, and was awarded the Victoria Cross on 1 January 1916 for an action at Ferrijik Junction, in what was then part of Bulgaria near the border with Ottoman-controlled Europe, on 19 November 1915. Today, Feres (Ferecik in Turkish) is in the Evros region of modern Greece. Davies was 29 years old, and in command of No. 3 Squadron RNAS. His citation read:

The KING has been graciously pleased to approve of the grant of the Victoria Cross to Squadron-Commander Richard Bell Davies, D.S.O., R.N., and of the Distinguished Service Cross to Flight Sub-Lieutenant Gilbert Formby Smylie, R.N., in recognition of their behaviour in the following circumstances:—

On the 19th November these two officers carried out an air attack on Ferrijik Junction. Flight Sub-Lieutenant Smylie's machine was received by very heavy fire and brought down. The pilot planed down over the station, releasing all his bombs except one, which failed to drop, simultaneously at the station from a very low altitude. Thence he continued his descent into the marsh. On alighting he saw the one unexploded bomb, and set fire to his machine, knowing that the bomb would ensure its destruction. He then proceeded towards Turkish territory.

At this moment he perceived Squadron-Commander Davies descending, and fearing that he would come down near the burning machine and thus risk destruction from the bomb, Flight Sub-Lieutenant Smylie ran back and from a short distance exploded the bomb by means of a pistol bullet. Squadron-Commander Davies descended at a safe distance from the burning machine, took up Sub-Lieutenant Smylie, in spite of the near approach of a party of the enemy, and returned to the aerodrome, a feat of airmanship that can seldom have been equalled for skill and gallantry.

This was the first combat search and rescue by aircraft in history. Like later search and rescue efforts, Davies' action sprang from the desire to keep a compatriot from capture or death at the hands of the enemy; unlike most of those future efforts, it was a one-man impromptu action that succeeded because of a peculiarity in construction of his aircraft. The Nieuport 10 he was flying was a single seat model which had had its front cockpit decked over. When Davies picked him up under rifle fire, Smylie wriggled past Davies and through his controls into the tiny roofed-over front compartment. Smylie was so thoroughly wedged among the controls that, upon landing, it took two hours to extricate him.

Davies was also mentioned in despatches for his Gallipoli service.

In early 1916, Davies was transferred to the Western Front, conducting bombing raids behind German lines, and then as wing commander in the seaplane carrier HMS Campania, attached to the Grand Fleet. The RNAS was incorporated into the Royal Air Force in April 1918, but Davies relinquished his RAF commission in May 1919 and returned to naval service. After the war, he was awarded the Air Force Cross and the French Croix de guerre with Palm.

== Interbellum and Second World War ==
Davies was first lieutenant of HMS Lion in 1919–20; in charge of the Air Section of the Naval Staff 1920–24; and executive officer of HMS Royal Sovereign in the Atlantic Fleet 1924–26. He was promoted to captain in 1926 and was again in charge of the Air Section of the Naval Staff 1926–28.

He was Chief Staff Officer to the Rear Admiral commanding 1st Cruiser Squadron in the Mediterranean 1929–30, and Liaison Officer for the Fleet Air Arm at the Air Ministry 1931–33. He commanded HMS Cornwall on the China station 1933–35 and the naval base at Devonport (HMS Drake) 1936–38. He was promoted to rear admiral in 1938 and from 1939 to 1941 was Rear Admiral, Naval Air Stations, based at RNAS Lee-on-Solent (HMS Daedalus). He was appointed a Companion of the Order of the Bath in the King's Birthday Honours of 1939.

Davies was promoted to vice admiral upon retiring on 29 May 1941, aged 55. He then joined the Royal Naval Reserve (RNR) with a reduction in rank to commander. As an RNR officer, he served as a convoy commodore, and as commissioning captain of the escort carrier HMS Dasher and the trials carrier HMS Pretoria Castle. He left the RNR in 1944.

== Death and legacy ==
He died at RNH Haslar in Gosport, Hampshire. His Victoria Cross is on display at the Fleet Air Arm Museum in Yeovil, Somerset.

On 19 November 2015, he was remembered at a memorial service in central London, with a memorial stone laid in Sloane Square, Chelsea.

== See also ==
- List of firsts in aviation
