= Reginald Henderson =

Admiral Sir Reginald Henderson GCB
- Born: Reginald Guy Hannam Henderson; 1 September 1881; Falmouth, Cornwall, England
- Died: 2 May 1939 (aged 57); Haslar, Hampshire
- Military career
- Allegiance: United Kingdom
- Branch: Royal Navy
- Rank: Admiral
- Commands: HMS Furious
- Conflicts: World War I
- Awards: Knight Grand Cross of the Order of the Bath

Admiral Sir Reginald Guy Hannam Henderson, GCB (1 September 1881 – 2 May 1939) was a Royal Navy officer who went on to be Third Sea Lord and Controller of the Navy.

== Early life and education ==
Henderson was born into a naval family in Falmouth, Cornwall, the son of Commander John Hannam Henderson and Betsy Ann May. He was the nephew of Admiral Sir Reginald Friend Hannam Henderson and Admiral Sir William Hannam Henderson. He had one brother, Lt.-Col. Henry May Henderson, who was killed in action in the First World War.

He entered HMS Britannia as a naval cadet in 1895.

== Naval career ==
Henderson was appointed an acting sub-lieutenant in the Royal Navy in November 1900, confirmed as such in 1902, and posted to HMS Syren in April that year. He was promoted to lieutenant on 15 May 1902, and in November that year was posted to the battleship HMS Venerable, on her first commission, to the Mediterranean Fleet. He took part in the Naval Mission to Greece in 1913. He served in World War I as Commander (executive officer) of the battleship HMS Erin in 1914 and took part in the Battle of Jutland in 1916.

In 1917, as a commander involved in anti-submarine warfare, he quietly opposed the Admiralty's official position that the volume of merchant shipping was too great to be protected by warships. Henderson demonstrated that the vast majority of the 2,500 ships completing voyages each week were in fact coastal voyages, and only between 120 and 140 ocean-going. Hankey's biographer Stephen Roskill suggested that Henderson's contribution to the introduction of convoys (in particular to Hankey's memorandum of February 1917) was not acknowledged on paper at the time in order to avoid imperilling the younger officer's career.

After the War he became Chief Staff Officer to the Commander-in-Chief, China Station and then, in 1923, joined the staff of the Royal Naval College, Greenwich.

Henderson later promoted the Fleet Air Arm and the construction of aircraft carriers. He was given command of the aircraft carrier HMS Furious in 1926 and became Naval Aide-de-Camp to King George V in 1928. He was appointed Rear Admiral commanding aircraft carriers in 1931 and Third Sea Lord and Controller of the Navy in 1934. As such he played a significant role in all of the major warship procurements for the Royal Navy in the rearmament period running up to the Second World War, in particular the new aircraft carrier, escort and cruiser forces. He was earmarked for higher command until his early death.

He was appointed a Companion of the Order of the Bath (CB) following the First World War and knighted in the order (KCB) in 1936. He was promoted to full admiral in January 1939, but fell ill and was forced to retire in March 1939. In April 1939, he was promoted to Knight Grand Cross of the Order of the Bath (GCB), which, owing to his illness, was accepted by his wife on his behalf at Buckingham Palace.

== Personal life ==
In 1911, he married Islay Edith Campbell Campbell. They had three sons, two surviving to adulthood.

He died in May at the Royal Naval Hospital in Haslar, Portsmouth, aged 57.

Military offices
Preceded by Sir Charles Forbes	Third Sea Lord and Controller of the Navy; 1934–1939	Succeeded by Sir Bruce Fraser
