= Alexander Bingley =

Royal Navy Admiral (1905–1972)

Admiral Sir Alexander Bingley GCB OBE
- Bingley in 1955
- Born: 15 February 1905
- Died: 28 September 1972 (aged 67)
- Spouse: Juliet Vick (m. 1948)
- Children: 3
- Military career
- Allegiance: British Empire; United Kingdom
- Branch: Royal Navy
- Service years: 1918–1922 (British Empire); 1922–1963 (United Kingdom)
- Rank: Admiral
- Nickname: Alec
- Commands: Allied Command Channel (1961–63); Commander-in-Chief, Portsmouth (1961–63); Allied Forces Mediterranean (1959–61); Mediterranean Fleet (1959–61); Flag Officer, Aircraft Carriers (1958–59); HMS Eagle (1952–53); HMS Nabaron (1945); HMS Biter (1944); HMS Slinger (1943–44)
- Conflicts: Second World War
- Awards: Knight Grand Cross of the Order of the Bath; Officer of the Order of the British Empire

Admiral Sir Alexander Noel Campbell Bingley, GCB, OBE (15 February 1905 – 28 September 1972) was a Royal Navy officer who served as Commander-in-Chief, Portsmouth and Allied Command Channel from 1961 to 1963.

== Naval career ==
Bingley joined the Royal Navy as a cadet in 1918.

Bingley served during World War II on the staff of the commander-in-chief, Home Fleet. He went on to be captain of the aircraft carrier HMS Slinger in 1943, of the aircraft carrier HMS Biter in 1944, and of the Mobile Naval Air Base HMS Nabaron in 1945.

After the war, Bingley was appointed deputy director of air warfare. He went on to be chief of staff to the flag officer (air) and then commander of the aircraft carrier HMS Eagle in 1952. He was appointed Fifth Sea Lord and deputy chief of Naval Staff (Air) in 1954 and Flag Officer, Aircraft Carriers in 1958. He was made commander-in-chief, Mediterranean Fleet and NATO commander Allied Forces Mediterranean in 1959 and then Commander-in-Chief, Portsmouth and Allied Commander-in-Chief, Channel in 1961; he retired in 1963.

== Personal life ==
Bingley married Juliet Vick in 1948. After his death, she resumed her career as a social worker after a gap of 28 years, and was appointed a Member of the Order of the British Empire in 1970. They had three children, and lived at Hoddesdon in Hertfordshire.

Military offices
Preceded by Sir Edmund Anstice	Fifth Sea Lord; 1954–1957	Succeeded by Sir Manley Power
Preceded by Sir Charles Lambe	Commander-in-Chief, Mediterranean Fleet; 1959–1961	Succeeded by Sir Deric Holland-Martin
Preceded by Sir Manley Power	Commander-in-Chief, Portsmouth; 1961–1963	Succeeded by Sir Wilfrid Woods
Honorary titles
Preceded by Sir Peter Reid	Rear-Admiral of the United Kingdom; 1966–1972	Succeeded by Sir Nigel Henderson
