= Charles Lambe =

Royal Navy Admiral of the Fleet (1900–1960)

Admiral of the Fleet Sir Charles Lambe GCB CVO
- Sir Charles Lambe in his capacity as Admiral
- Born: 20 December 1900; Stalbridge, Dorset
- Died: 29 August 1960 (aged 59); Newport-on-Tay, Fife
- Military career
- Allegiance: United Kingdom
- Branch: Royal Navy
- Service years: 1917–1960
- Rank: Admiral of the Fleet
- Commands: First Sea Lord (1959–60); Mediterranean Fleet (1957–59); Far East Fleet (1953–54); Flag Officer, Air (Home) (1951–53); 3rd Aircraft Carrier Squadron (1949–51); Flag Officer, Flying Training (1947–48); HMS Illustrious (1944–45); HMS Dunedin (1939–40)
- Conflicts: First World War; Second World War
- Awards: Knight Grand Cross of the Order of the Bath; Commander of the Royal Victorian Order; Mentioned in Despatches (3); Legion of Merit (United States); Order of the Dannebrog (Denmark)

Admiral of the Fleet Sir Charles Edward Lambe, GCB, CVO (20 December 1900 – 29 August 1960) was a senior Royal Navy officer. He fought in the Second World War in command of a cruiser, as Director of Naval Plans and then in command of an aircraft carrier. He served as First Sea Lord and Chief of the Naval Staff from 1959 until 1960 when he was forced to retire early because of a heart condition. He died only a few months later.

== Naval career ==
Born the son of Henry Edward Lambe and Lilian Hope Lambe (née Bramwell), Lambe was educated at the Royal Naval College, Osborne. He joined the Royal Navy as a cadet in 1914 and was posted as a midshipman to the battleship HMS Emperor of India on 15 August 1917; he remained with her until the end of the First World War.

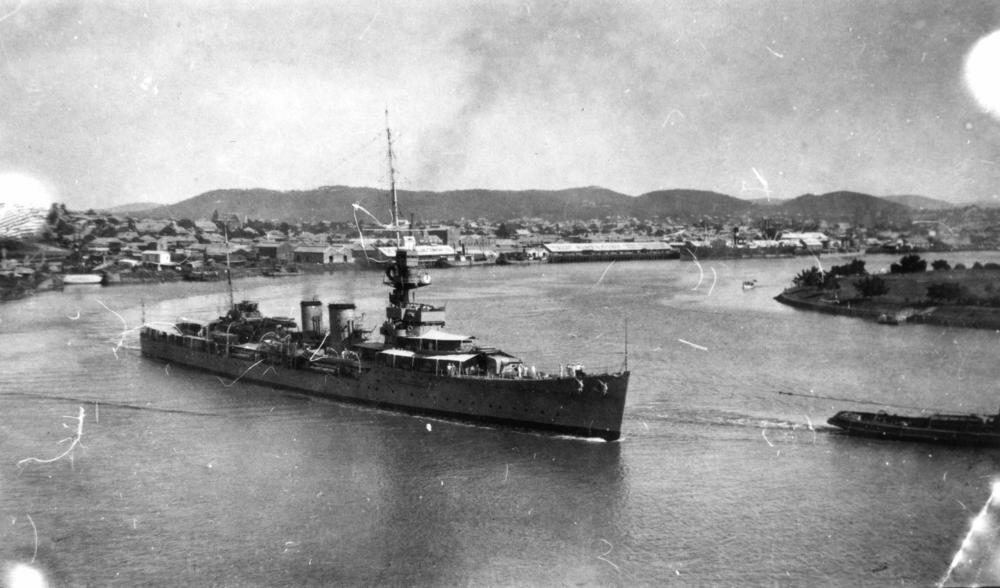
The cruiser HMS Dunedin, which Lambe commanded as part of the Northern Patrol in the early part of the Second World War

Lambe transferred to the battleship HMS King George V in June 1919 and, having been promoted to sub-lieutenant on 15 January 1921, was posted to the cruiser HMS Raleigh in March 1921. Promoted to lieutenant on 15 February 1922, he joined the battleship HMS Benbow in the Mediterranean Fleet in August 1923. He attended the torpedo school, HMS Vernon, in 1926 and after qualifying there, joined the destroyer HMS Stuart in the Mediterranean Fleet as torpedo officer. Promoted to lieutenant commander on 15 February 1930, he attended the Royal Naval Staff College in 1931 and then joined the cruiser HMS Hawkins on the East Indies Station. Promoted to commander on 30 June 1933, he joined the staff of the Flag Officer, Destroyer Flotillas in the Mediterranean Fleet before returning home to become Commander of HMS Vernon. He was appointed equerry to the King on 1 September 1936 and, having been promoted to captain on 31 December 1937 and appointed a Commander of the Royal Victorian Order on 28 September 1938, he was given command of the cruiser HMS Dunedin in January 1939.

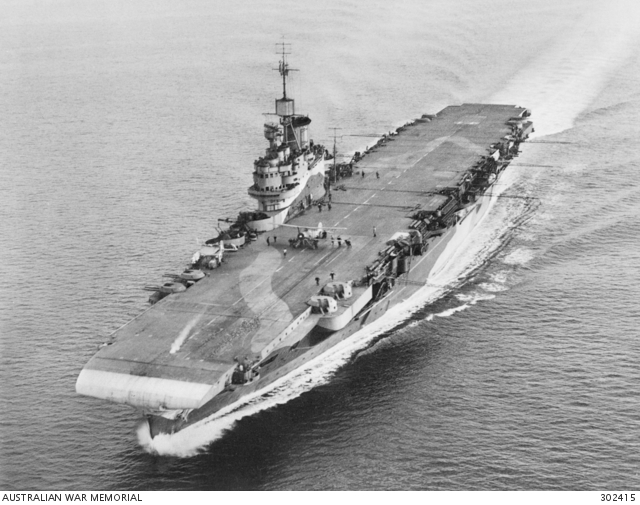
The aircraft carrier HMS Illustrious, which Lambe commanded in the British Pacific Fleet later on in the Second World War

Lambe served in the Second World War, initially in command of HMS Dunedin as part of the Northern Patrol and, from October 1940, in the Plans Department at the Admiralty, where he served successively as Assistant Director, as Deputy Director and, from March 1942, as Director. Appointed a Companion of the Order of the Bath in the 1944 New Year Honours, he was given command of the aircraft carrier HMS Illustrious in the British Pacific Fleet in May 1944 and survived a kamikazi attack in April 1945. He was three times mentioned in despatches, and was also awarded the American Legion of Merit for his service during the war.

After the war, Lambe served as Assistant Chief of the Naval Staff (Air) from August 1945. He was appointed a Naval Aide-de-Camp to the King on 8 January 1947. Promoted to rear admiral on 8 July 1947, he became Flag Officer, Flying Training in September 1947 and commander of the 3rd Aircraft Carrier Squadron in the Home Fleet in September 1949. In 1950 he offered a place on the Home Fleet's spring cruise to the composer Lennox Berkeley, who was composing Nelson, an opera based on the life of Lord Nelson; the route of the cruise passed through the waters of the Battle of Trafalgar. Lambe, who was an able pianist, had Berkeley's cabin fitted up with a pair of grand pianos so that they could play piano duets during the voyage.

Promoted to vice admiral on 1 December 1950, Lambe became Flag Officer, Air (Home) at Lee-on-Solent in March 1951 and took part in the funeral of King George VI in February 1952. He was advanced to Knight Commander of the Order of the Bath in the 1953 New Year Honours, before becoming Commander-in-Chief, Far East Station in March 1953. Promoted to full admiral on 30 March 1954, he went on to be Second Sea Lord and Chief of Naval Personnel in October 1955 and, having been advanced to Knight Grand Cross of the Order of the Bath in the 1957 Birthday Honours, he became Commander-in-Chief, Mediterranean Fleet as well as NATO Commander, Allied Forces Mediterranean in November 1957.

Lambe became First Sea Lord and Chief of the Naval Staff in May 1959. He suffered a serious heart attack only six months after taking office and was promoted to Admiral of the Fleet on his early retirement on 10 May 1960. He died at his home at Newport-on-Tay in Fife on 29 August 1960.

== Family ==
In 1940, Lambe married Lesbia Rachel Mylius (née Corbet); they had one son and one daughter.

== Sources ==
- Heathcote, Tony (2002). The British Admirals of the Fleet 1734 – 1995. Pen & Sword Ltd. ISBN 0-85052-835-6.
- Dickinson, Peter (2003). The Music of Lennox Berkeley. Boydell Press. ISBN 978-0851159362.

Military offices
Preceded by Sir Guy Russell	Commander-in-Chief, Far East Fleet; 1953–1954	Succeeded by Sir Alan Scott-Moncrieff
Preceded by Sir Guy Russell	Second Sea Lord; 1955–1957	Succeeded by Sir Deric Holland-Martin
Preceded by Sir Ralph Edwards	Commander-in-Chief, Mediterranean Fleet; 1958–1959	Succeeded by Sir Alexander Bingley
Preceded by The Earl Mountbatten	First Sea Lord; 1959–1960	Succeeded by Sir Caspar John
