= Assistant Chief of the Naval Staff (Aviation, Amphibious Capability & Carriers) =

UK naval appointment

Office of the Assistant Chief of the Naval Staff (Aviation, Amphibious Capability & Carriers)
- Ensign of the Royal Navy
- Ministry of Defence
- Reports to: Second Sea Lord
- Nominator: First Sea Lord
- Appointer: Prime Minister; Subject to formal approval by the King-in-Council
- Term length: Not fixed (typically 1–3 years)
- Inaugural holder: Rear-Admiral Richard Bell Davies
- Formation: 24 May 1939–current

The Assistant Chief of the Naval Staff (Aviation, Amphibious Capability & Carriers) formerly the Assistant Chief of the Naval Staff (Aviation and Carrier Strike) is a senior Royal Navy appointment responsible for naval aviation. The post is also the successor to the Royal Navy's Flag Officer for naval aviation in the British Isles, established since 1939.

== Flag Officer, Naval Air Stations ==
The post of Flag Officer Naval Air Stations was established in May 1939 to provide land based support for the Fleet Air Arm, then being transferred from the Royal Air Force to the Royal Navy.

- Rear Admiral Richard Bell Davies: 24 May 1939 – 30 September 1941
- Rear Admiral Clement Moody: 30 September 1941 – April 1943
- Rear Admiral Cloudesley Robinson: April 1943 – April 1945

== Flag Officer, Air, Home ==
In May 1945 the FONAS post was re-styled Flag Officer Air Home.

In September 1945 the post of Flag Officer, Flying Training was created, to be followed by Flag Officer, Ground Training and Rear-Admiral, Reserve Aircraft (an Equipment Branch post) in January 1949. The Reserve Aircraft post was disestablished in 1956 and the Ground Training post in 1957.

Flag Officer, Air, Home flew his flag from RNAS Lee-on-Solent (HMS Daedalus); the post existed until 1963. He was responsible for shore-based air command working up squadrons to operational effectiveness, and after an Operational Readiness Inspection, delivering them to the Fleet.

- Vice-Admiral Sir Cloudesley Varyl Robinson: May 1945 (then retired)
- Vice-Admiral Denis Boyd: June 1945 – April 1946. Title also reported as Admiral (Air).
- Rear-Admiral Geoffrey Oliver: April–September 1946
- Vice-Admiral Sir Thomas Hope Troubridge: September 1946 – November 1947
- Admiral Sir Reginald Portal: November 1947 – March 1951
- Vice-Admiral Sir Charles Lambe: March 1951 – January 1953
- Vice-Admiral Sir John Eccles: January 1953 – June 1955
- Vice-Admiral Sir Caspar John: June 1955 – March 1957
- Admiral Sir Walter Couchman: March 1957 – January 1960
- Admiral Sir Deric Holland-Martin: January 1960 – May 1961
- Vice-Admiral Desmond Dreyer: May 1961 – October 1962
- Vice-Admiral Sir John Hamilton: October 1962 – January 1964

== Flag Officer, Naval Air Command ==
This post was created on 30 September 1963 as renaming of Flag Officer Air, Home, at the time a Vice-Admiral's command.

In November 1970 the post of Flag Officer, Flying Training was disestablished. Sir John Treacher, who was in post from June 1972, wrote in Life at Full Throttle that '..the tasks undertaken by the old Flying Training Command and Flag Officer Air (Home) had now been taken over by the Flag Officer Naval Air Command to form a single entity and the headquarters had been moved from Lee-on-Solent to the Royal Naval Air Station at Yeovilton. In April 2010 the post was renamed Assistant Chief of the Naval Staff (Carriers & Aviation).

- Vice-Admiral Sir Richard Smeeton: January 1964 – October 1965
- Vice-Admiral Sir Donald Gibson: October 1965 – October 1968
- Vice-Admiral Sir Richard Janvrin: October 1968 – November 1970
- Vice-Admiral Michael Fell: November 1970 – June 1972
- Vice-Admiral John Treacher: June 1972 – August 1973
- Vice-Admiral Sir Peter Austin: August 1973 – August 1976
- Rear-Admiral John Roberts: August 1976 – February 1978
- Vice-Admiral Sir Desmond Cassidi: February 1978 – June 1979
- Rear-Admiral Edward Anson: June 1979 – May 1982
- Vice-Admiral Sir John Cox: May 1982 – September 1983
- Vice-Admiral Sir Derek Reffell: September 1983 – September 1984
- Rear-Admiral Linley Middleton: September 1984 – February 1987
- Rear-Admiral Roger Dimmock: February 1987 – August 1988
- Rear-Admiral Michael Layard: August 1988 – December 1990
- Rear-Admiral Colin Cooke-Priest: December 1990 – February 1993
- Rear-Admiral Ian Garnett: February 1993 – June 1995
- Rear-Admiral Terence Loughran: June 1995 – October 1998
- Rear-Admiral Iain Henderson: October 1998 – July 2001 - Flag Officer, Maritime Aviation
- Rear-Admiral Scott Lidbetter: July 2001 – 2003
- Rear-Admiral Simon Charlier: September 2008 – April 2010

== Assistant Chief of the Naval Staff (Aviation, Amphibious Capability & Carriers) ==
In 2012, this post's responsibilities were officially described as '..ACNS(A&C) is responsible for delivering aviation Force Elements at Readiness in accordance with the RN plan and arising, contingent events. This includes all RN fixed and rotary wing assets, the two Naval Air Stations and the generation of aircraft carriers and carrier capability. He is the lead, on behalf of the Fleet Commander, for the development of the future Carrier Strike capability. As the Navy's Aviation Operational Duty Holder, he is personally, legally accountable for the safe execution of maritime aviation by all Royal Navy units, including aircraft, ships and submarines. ACNS(A&CS) is also Rear Admiral Fleet Air Arm in which role, as a Head of a Naval Fighting Arm, he is responsible for the professional effectiveness, ethos and spirit of all Fleet Air Arm personnel.' It has been renamed as Assistant Chief of Naval Staff (Aviation, Amphibious Capability & Carriers) (ACNS(A&C)) and Rear-Admiral Fleet Air Arm around 2019.

Today the main air station that ACNS (A&CS) has responsibility for is RNAS Yeovilton (HMS Heron).

- Rear-Admiral Thomas Cunningham: April 2010 – September 2012
- Rear-Admiral Russ Harding: September 2012 – May 2015
- Rear-Admiral Keith Blount: May 2015 – February 2019
- Rear-Admiral Martin Connell: February 2019–January 2022
