= Juliet Bingley =

English social worker (1925–2005)

Juliet Bingley MBE
- Born: Juliet Martin Vick; 18 July 1925; London, England
- Died: 16 January 2005 (aged 79)
- Occupation: social worker
- Known for: National Association for Colitis and Crohn's Disease
- Spouse: Alexander Bingley (m. 1948; died 1972)
- Children: 3
- Parent: Reginald Vick

Juliet Martin Bingley MBE (18 July 1925 – 16 January 2005, née Vick) was an English social worker. She was chair of MIND for four years and one of the founders of the National Association for Colitis and Crohn's Disease, of which she was for a time vice-chair.

== Early life and education ==
Juliet Martin Vick was born on 18 July 1925 on Harley Street in London; her father was surgeon Reginald Vick. She attended King Alfred School, London and gained a degree in social administration at the London School of Economics.

== Social work ==
Bingley started work in 1945 as a medical social worker at St Bartholomew's Hospital, but gave up this career in 1948 when she married, resuming it when widowed 24 years later.

While living in Malta with her husband she became involved in work improving the social welfare system there, and when in 1961 he was posted as Commander in Chief at Portsmouth she worked to improve the Naval Family Welfare Services. After his retirement she became involved with the National Association for Mental Health (now MIND), and was its chair 1979–1983.

After her husband died suddenly in 1972, Bingley resumed work as a medical social worker, taking a part-time post at St Mark's Hospital, London. The hospital specialised in intestinal disorders and she supported patients whose lives were affected by these disabling conditions. In 1979, she was one of the founders of the then National Association for Colitis and Crohn's, now known as Crohn's and Colitis UK. She was appointed MBE in the 1991 New Year Honours, "For services to St. Mark's Hospital, City and Hackney Health Authority".

== Personal life ==
She married Alexander Bingley in 1948, and they bought a house Hoddensbury in Hoddesdon, Hertfordshire, which was her home to the end of her life. He was knighted in 1959, which gave her the title Lady Bingley. They lived in Malta from 1958 to 1961 while he was Commander in Chief of the Mediterranean Fleet. They had three children, all of whom survived her along with seven grandchildren. She died on 16 January 2005, in hospital after a stroke.

== Publications ==
In 2002, she published a book of poetry, What it was and what it was not (Rockingham Press: ISBN 1873468822), based on her years living in Malta 1958–1961. She also published four children's books.
