= Raymond Lygo =

Royal Navy Admiral (1924–2012)

Admiral Sir Raymond Lygo KCB
- Captain Raymond Lygo on HMS Juno, 1968
- Born: 15 March 1924
- Died: 7 March 2012 (aged 87)
- Military career
- Allegiance: United Kingdom
- Branch: Royal Navy
- Service years: 1942–1978
- Rank: Admiral
- Commands: Vice Chief of the Naval Staff; Naval Manpower and Training; HMS Ark Royal; HMS Juno; HMS Lowestoft
- Conflicts: Second World War
- Awards: Knight Commander of the Order of the Bath

Admiral Sir Raymond Derek Lygo, KCB (15 March 1924 – 7 March 2012) was a Royal Navy officer who served as Vice Chief of the Naval Staff from 1975 to 1978.

== Naval career ==
Educated at Ilford County High School and Clark's College, Bromley, Lygo joined the Royal Navy at HMS St. Vincent (Fleet Air Arm basic training establishment in Gosport, Hampshire) in 1942 during the Second World War. He was appointed the commanding officer of the frigate HMS Lowestoft in 1961, the frigate HMS Juno in 1967 and the aircraft carrier HMS Ark Royal in 1969. While in command of the latter in 1971, the Ark Royal collided with a Soviet cruiser that was shadowing her during an exercise in the Mediterranean. Damage to both vessels was slight, though two Soviet crewmen went missing. Lygo was cleared of any responsibility in the subsequent inquiry. He was next appointed Director-General, Naval Manpower and Training from February 1974 to June 1975. He went on to be Vice Chief of the Naval Staff in 1975, was promoted to full admiral on 9 February 1977, and retired in March 1978.

== Later life ==
After retirement, Lygo joined British Aerospace, becoming Chief Executive in 1986.

Lygo went on to be Chairman of the Rutland Trust in 1991, Chairman of TNT (Express) UK Ltd in 1992 and Chairman of the Liontrust First UK Investment Trust in 1997. He was Patron of the Fleet Air Arm Association.

== Family ==
In 1950, Lygo married Pepper Van Osten; they had two sons and one daughter.

Military offices
| Preceded by John Treacher | Flag Officer Carriers and Amphibious Ships; 1972–1974 | Succeeded by Desmond Cassidi |
| Preceded by Sir John Treacher | Vice Chief of the Naval Staff; 1975–1978 | Succeeded by Sir Anthony Morton |
