= Charles Woodhouse =

Royal Navy Admiral (1893–1978)

Admiral Sir Charles Woodhouse KCB
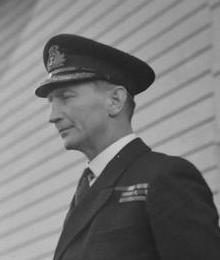
- Captain C H L Woodhouse aboard HMS Howe in January 1943
- Born: 9 July 1893; East Retford district, Nottinghamshire
- Died: 23 September 1978 (aged 85) Warlingham, Surrey
- Allegiance: United Kingdom
- Branch: Royal Navy
- Service years: 1906–1952
- Rank: Admiral
- Commands: HMS Ajax; HMS Howe; Rear-Admiral, Aircraft Carriers; Commander-in-Chief, East Indies
- Conflicts: Battle of the River Plate (1939)
- Awards: KCB; Commander, Order of Merit (Chile); Silver Medal of Concepcion

Admiral Sir Charles Henry Lawrence Woodhouse KCB (9 July 1893 – 23 September 1978) was an officer of the Royal Navy.

== Naval career ==
Woodhouse joined the Royal Navy in 1906. He served in World War I and specialized in gunnery. In 1935 he was appointed Assistant Director of Naval Equipment at the Admiralty.

He captained HMS Ajax in the Battle of the River Plate in December 1939. In October 1940 he became Director of the Local Division at the Admiralty and in April 1942 he assumed command of HMS Howe. In March 1944 he went on to be Director of Naval Ordnance at the Admiralty.

After the War he became Rear-Admiral, Aircraft Carriers and in 1948 he was made Commander-in-Chief, East Indies; he retired in 1950.

== In popular culture ==
In the 1956 film The Battle of the River Plate, Woodhouse was played by Ian Hunter.

Military offices
Preceded by Sir Arthur Palliser	Commander-in-Chief, East Indies Station; 1948–1950	Succeeded by Sir Geoffrey Oliver
