= Denis Boyd =

Royal Navy Admiral (1891–1965)

Admiral Sir Denis Boyd KCB CBE DSC
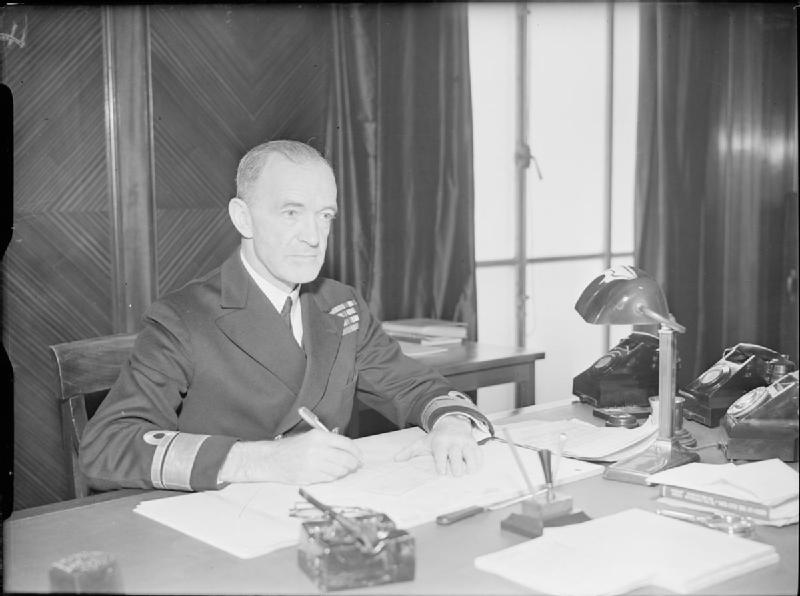
- Rear Admiral Boyd at his desk as Fifth Sea Lord
- Born: 6 March 1891; Manchester, England
- Died: 21 January 1965 (aged 73)
- Military career
- Allegiance: United Kingdom
- Branch: Royal Navy
- Service years: 1906–1949
- Rank: Admiral
- Commands: Far East Fleet (1946–49); Eastern Fleet Aircraft Carriers (1942); Mediterranean Aircraft Carriers (1941); HMS Illustrious (1941); HMS Vernon (1938–39); 2nd Destroyer Flotilla (1936–37); HMS Hardy (1936–37); HMS Valentine (1932)
- Conflicts: World War I World War II
- Awards: Knight Commander of the Order of the Bath; Commander of the Order of the British Empire; Distinguished Service Cross; Mentioned in Despatches

Sir Denis William Boyd (6 March 1891 – 21 January 1965) was a Royal Navy officer who served as Fifth Sea Lord from 1943 to 1945, and as Commander-in-Chief, Far East Fleet from 1946 to 1949.

== Naval career ==
=== Early career ===
Boyd joined the Royal Navy as a midshipman in 1906 and was commissioned in 1910. After serving as Torpedo Officer in HMS Fearless during World War I, he set off on a journey around the world aboard HMS Hood in 1922. He returned in 1923 and was then attached to the Royal Australian Navy from 1926. He was appointed Fleet Torpedo Officer in the Mediterranean Fleet in 1928 and, while serving with the Naval Equipment Department, he was promoted to captain in 1931. He was briefly Commanding Officer of the destroyer HMS Valentine in 1932, before joining the Tactical Division of the naval Staff in 1933 and becoming its Director in 1934.

Boyd became Commanding Officer of HMS Hardy and Captain (D) of the 2nd Destroyer Flotilla at Malta in 1936; a post that included responsibility for patrols off Spain during the Spanish Civil War. He was then made commanding officer of the Torpedo School HMS Vernon in 1938, serving there until the outbreak of World War II.

=== World War II ===
During the Second World War, Boyd captained the aircraft carrier HMS Illustrious from 1940, seeing action at the Battle of Taranto. Promoted to rear admiral in August 1941, he became Flag Officer, Mediterranean Aircraft Carriers. He moved to the Eastern Fleet in 1942 as admiral commanding aircraft carriers with HMS Indomitable as his flagship. He was appointed Fifth Sea Lord and Chief of Naval Air Equipment in 1943, and was promoted to vice admiral in August 1944. He then became Admiral (Air) at RNAS Lee-on-Solent (HMS Daedalus) in January 1945.

=== Post-war service ===
Boyd became Commander-in-Chief of the Far East Fleet in 1946. He was promoted to admiral in 1948 and retired in 1949.

== Later life ==
In retirement, Boyd became Principal of Ashridge College. He died, aged 73, on 21 January 1965.

Military offices
Preceded by Vacant (Last held by Sir Lumley Lyster)	Fifth Sea Lord; 1943–1945	Succeeded by Sir Thomas Troubridge
Preceded by Sir Bruce Fraser	Commander-in-Chief, Far East Fleet; 1946–1949	Succeeded by Sir Patrick Brind
