= Guy Royle =

Royal Navy Admiral (1885–1954)

Admiral Sir Guy Royle KCB CMG
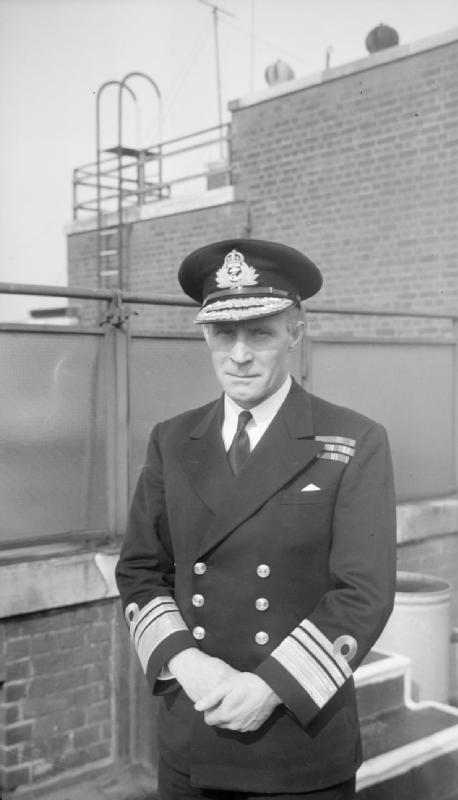
- Vice-Admiral Royle as Chief of Australian Naval Staff during the Second World War
- Born: Guy Charles Cecil Royle; 17 August 1885; Esher, Surrey
- Died: 4 January 1954 (aged 68); Ferndown, Dorset
- Military career
- Allegiance: United Kingdom
- Branch: Royal Navy
- Service years: 1900–1946
- Rank: Admiral
- Commands: Chief of the Australian Naval Staff (1941–45); HMS Glorious (1933–34); HMS Excellent (1930–32); HMS Canterbury (1927–29)
- Conflicts: First World War; Second World War
- Awards: Knight Commander of the Order of the Bath; Companion of the Order of St Michael and St George; Legion of Merit (United States); Order of Orange-Nassau (Netherlands)

Admiral Sir Guy Charles Cecil Royle, KCB, CMG (17 August 1885 – 4 January 1954) was a Royal Navy officer who went on to be Fifth Sea Lord and First Naval Member of the Royal Australian Navy.

== Naval career ==
Royle joined the Royal Navy as a midshipman in 1900. He served in the First World War as Gunnery Officer on the battleship HMS Marlborough and was at the Battle of Jutland in 1916, then on the staff of Admiral Sir Charles Madden in the Grand Fleet. By 1919 he had been promoted commander and in July 1919 was appointed a Companion of the Order of St Michael and St George "for valuable services as Gunnery officer of H. M. S. "Marlborough", 1st Battle Squadron, and as Flag Commander to the Admiral, Second in Command, Grand Fleet."

Royle was appointed Assistant to the Deputy Director of Naval Ordnance in 1923 and became Naval attaché in Tokyo in 1924. He was given command of the cruiser HMS Canterbury in 1927, the shore establishment HMS Excellent in 1930 and the aircraft carrier HMS Glorious in 1933. He went on to be Naval Secretary from 1934 and to 1937, when he was appointed Vice Admiral commanding the aircraft carriers, serving until 1939. In the Second World War, he returned briefly as Naval Secretary from September to November, 1939, then until 1941 was Fifth Sea Lord and Chief of the Naval Air Service, when he became First Naval Member of the Australian Commonwealth Naval Board; he retired the service in 1946.

Royle was knighted in 1941 and promoted admiral in 1942.

In retirement he was appointed briefly as Secretary to the Lord Great Chamberlain and finally as Yeoman Usher (deputy) of the Black Rod, a ceremonial position in the House of Lords, serving in that office from 1946 to 1953. He collapsed and died while putting out a heath fire near his home at Wimborne Minster in Dorset.

Military offices
Preceded by Sidney Meyrick	Naval Secretary; 1934–1937	Succeeded by William Whitworth
Preceded by Sir Alexander Ramsay	Fifth Sea Lord; 1939–1941	Succeeded by Sir Lumley Lyster
Preceded by Sir Ragnar Colvin	Chief of the Australian Naval Staff; 1941–1945	Succeeded by Sir Louis Hamilton
