= HMS Valentine (L69) =

Destroyer of the Royal Navy

Coordinates: 51°20′N 03°49′E

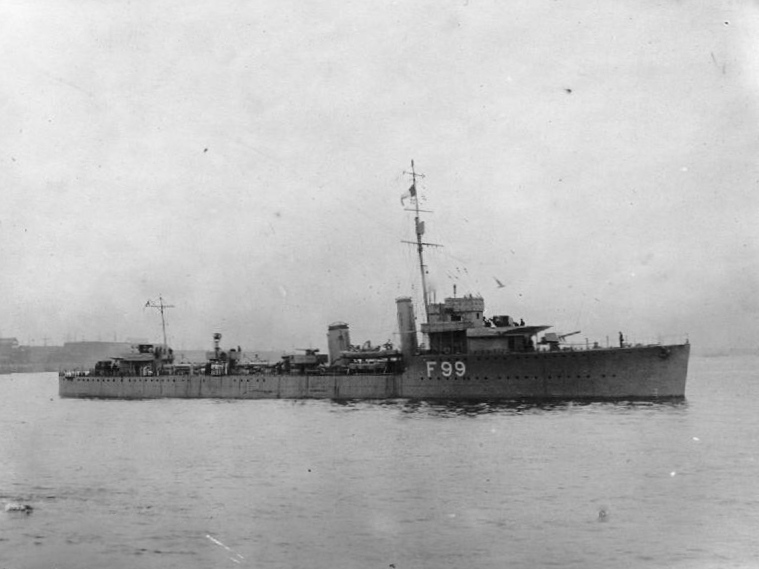
- HMS Valentine, circa 1917-18

History

United Kingdom
- Name: HMS Valentine
- Owner: Royal Navy
- Ordered: July 1916
- Builder: Cammell Laird
- Laid down: 7 August 1916
- Launched: 24 March 1917
- Commissioned: 27 June 1917
- Out of service: 15 May 1940
- Fate: Beached after attack from dive bombers.

General characteristics As built
- Class & type: Admiralty V-class leader
- Displacement: 1,188 long tons (1,207 t) standard; 1,473 long tons (1,497 t) full load
- Length: 300 ft (91.44 m) pp; 312 ft (95.10 m) oa
- Beam: 29 ft 6 in (8.99 m)
- Draught: 10 feet 8 inches (3.25 m) – 11 ft 7 1/2 in (3.54 m)
- Propulsion: 3 Yarrow-type Water-tube boilers, Brown-Curtis geared steam turbines, 2 shafts, 27,000 shp (20,134 kW)
- Speed: 34 kn (63 km/h; 39 mph)
- Range: 3,500 nmi (6,500 km; 4,000 mi) at 15 kn (28 km/h; 17 mph)
- Complement: 115
- Armament: 4 × QF 4 in Mk.V (102mm L/45) guns on mount CP.II; 1 × 3 inch (76 mm) QF 20 cwt anti-aircraft gun; 4 (2x2) tubes for 21-inch (533 mm) torpedoes

HMS Valentine was a V and W-class destroyer, built in 1917 for the Royal Navy. She fought in both world wars, serving in several capacities. She was heavily damaged by air attack and beached in 1940 near Terneuzen. Her hulk remained there until it was broken up in 1953.

== Construction and design ==
In early 1916, the British Royal Navy had a requirement for a destroyer leader suitable for leading the new, fast, R-class destroyers. To meet this requirement, the Director of Naval Construction prepared the design of a new class of ships, smaller and cheaper than the existing Marksman and Parker-classes, but still capable of accommodating the additional staff required to command the destroyer flotilla and carrying the same armament. Five ships of the new class were ordered in April–July 1916, with Valentine one of two ships ordered from Cammell Laird in July that year at a tender price of £218,000 per ship. Valentine was laid down at Cammell Laird's shipyard in Birkenhead on 7 August 1916, was launched on 24 March 1917 and completed on 27 June 1917.

The ship's machinery was based on that of the R-class destroyers, with three Yarrow boilers feeding Brown-Curtiss geared steam turbines which drove two propeller shafts. The machinery generated 27,000 shaft horsepower (20,000 kW), giving a design speed of 34 knots (63 km/h; 39 mph). A maximum of 367 tons of fuel oil could be carried, giving a range of 3,500 nautical miles (6,500 km; 4,000 mi) at a speed of 15 knots (28 km/h; 17 mph).

The ship's main gun armament was four 4 inch (102 mm) QF Mk V guns on CP.II mountings, with two mounts forward and two aft in superimposed positions. These guns, which were provided with 120 rounds per gun, could elevate to 30 degrees, allowing them to fire a 31 pounds (14 kg) shell a distance of 13,840 yards (12,660 m). Anti-aircraft armament consisted of a single 3 inch (76 mm) QF 20 cwt gun, which was preferred to the 2-pounder "Pom-Poms" fitted to previous leaders, while torpedo armament consisted of four 21 inch (53 cm) torpedo tubes in two twin mounts. Valentine was fitted for minelaying in November 1917, but it appears that this capability was never used.

== Service ==
=== First World War and Baltic campaign ===
On completion, Valentine served with the Grand Fleet, as part of the 13th Destroyer Flotilla and the 6th Light Cruiser Squadron. When commissioned, Valentine was assigned the pennant number F99, which was changed to F30 in January 1918. In October 1917, Valentine was deployed as part of an elaborate anti-submarine operation, in which destroyers and submarines were to be used to drive German U-boats that were returning to port from operations and passing to the east of the Dogger Bank into a large (several miles long) array of mine nets. Valentine was one of six destroyers whose job was to escort the drifters deploying the nets. The operation lasted for 10 days, and British Intelligence believed that three U-boats were probably sunk in the operation. However, the submarines in question were almost certainly lost in other mine-fields. Later that month, Valentine formed part of the destroyer escort to the 6th Light Cruiser Squadron when it was deployed as part of a scheme to attack German minesweepers in the Heligoland Bight. This resulted in the inconclusive Second Battle of Heligoland Bight. An attempt by Valentine and the destroyer Vanquisher to carry out a torpedo attack on German cruisers proved unsuccessful.

On 12 February 1919, Valentine was damaged in a collision with the destroyer Verdun, also of the 13th Flotilla. In March 1919, Valentine joined the 2nd Destroyer Flotilla of the Atlantic Fleet. From August to November 1919, Valentine was deployed to the Baltic Sea as part of the British intervention in the Russian Civil War, which helped to ensure the independence of the Baltic states.

=== Peacetime service ===
Although the Treaty of Tartu between Estonia and Soviet Russia and a ceasefire between Latvia and the Soviets, both in February 1920, ended the fighting in the Baltic, Royal Navy deployments to the region continued, with Valentine again operating in the Baltic in June 1920. Valentine continued as part of the flotilla until January 1922, when she joined the 9th Destroyer Flotilla based at Rosyth. In January 1923, she rejoined the 2nd Destroyer Flotilla, first as part of the Atlantic Fleet and from September 1924 as part of the Mediterranean Fleet. In September 1928, Valentine formed part of an Asdic-equipped anti-submarine screen of four destroyers protecting the capital ships of the Mediterranean Fleet during Exercise NX. In the 1920s, Valentine's twin torpedo tubes were replaced by triple tubes, giving a torpedo armament of six 21 inch torpedoes, and the 12-pounder anti-aircraft gun was replaced by a 2-pounder "pom-pom".

Valentine joined the 6th Destroyer Flotilla of the Home Fleet in July 1932, where she served until she went into reserve at Devonport in November 1934. Valentine was re-commissioned into the 21st Destroyer Flotilla in September 1935, returning to the reserve in May 1936.

=== Conversion ===
In 1936, the Admiralty recognised that the Royal Navy had a shortage of escort ships with good anti-aircraft armament, suitable for operations along the East coast of the Great Britain. As well as building a new class of escort destroyers designed for this role (the Hunt-class escort destroyers), it was decided to convert a number of old destroyers of the V and W classes, now obsolete as fleet destroyers, to perform a similar role. This programme became known as the "Wair" conversions. The conversion involved the replacement of the ship's entire armament. Two twin QF 4 inch Mk XVI naval gun anti-aircraft mounts were fitted, with a modern fire control system mounted on a new superstructure to direct their fire. Two quadruple Vickers .50 machine gun mounts provided close-in anti-aircraft armament. Modern sonar, and a relatively powerful depth-charge outfit of 30 depth charges provided the ship's anti-submarine equipment. No torpedo tubes were fitted.

Valentine was selected as one of the destroyers to undergo the Wair conversion, being converted at Devonport Dockyard, Plymouth between June 1939 and 23 April 1940.

== Loss ==
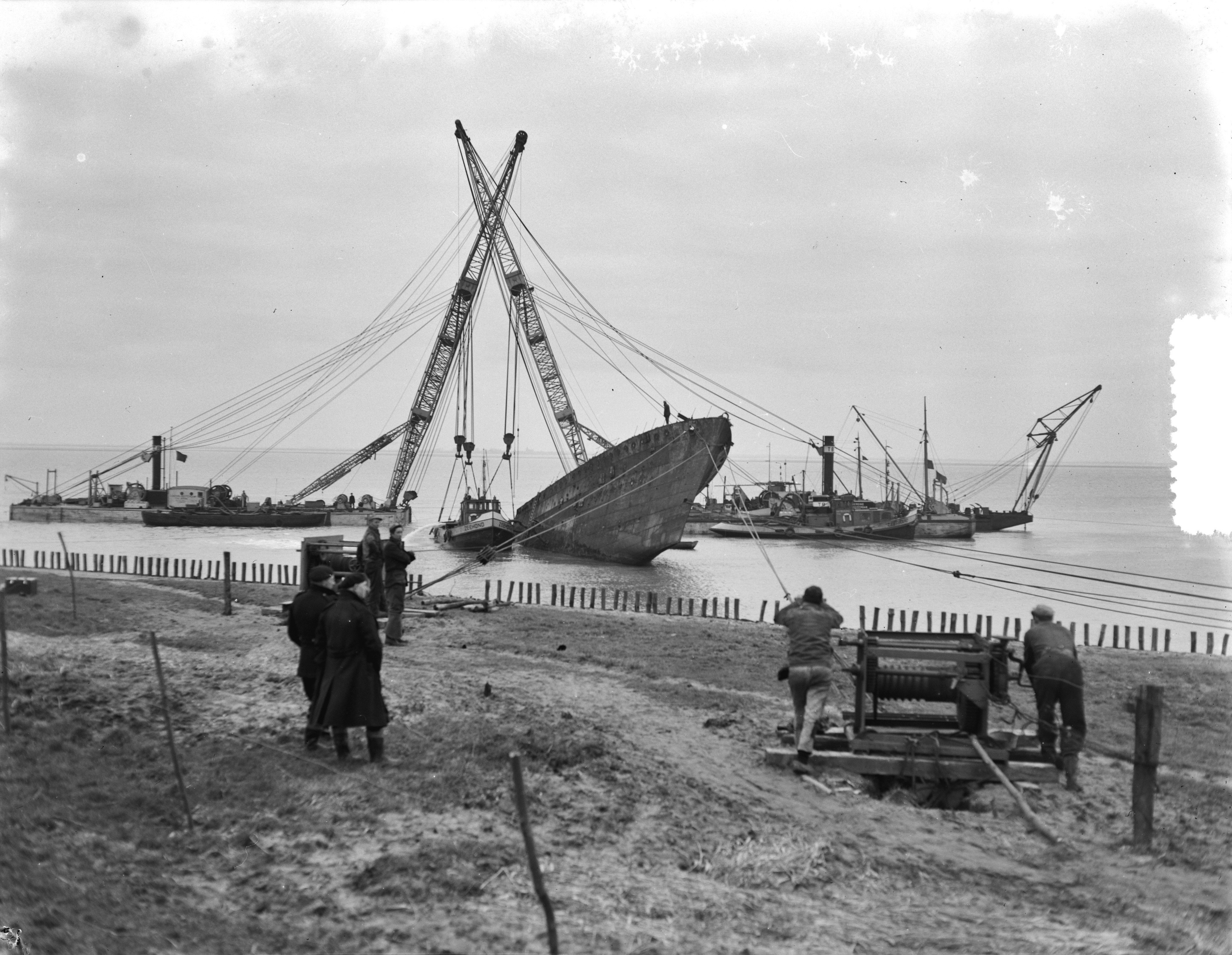
Salvaging of Valentine in 1953

After completing work-up, Valentine joined the Nore Command, responsible for East coast convoys, transferring to Dover Command in May. Valentine was one of four destroyers deployed to the Scheldt estuary to support demolition operations and the evacuation of shipping from Antwerp. While providing AA cover to Allied troops, Valentine was damaged by dive bombers on 15 May 1940, and beached near Terneuzen. 31 of Valentine's crew were killed, with a further 21 injured. Valentine was partly salvaged and broken up in 1953, but part of the ship's hull remains and is sometimes visible at low tide.
