= Lumley Lyster =

Royal Navy Vice-Admiral (1888–1957)

Admiral Sir Lumley Lyster KCB CVO CBE DSO
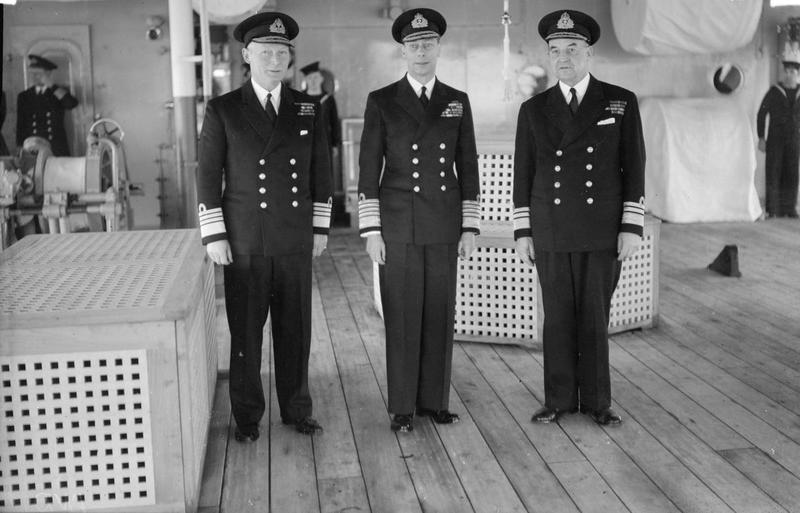
- King George VI with Admiral Sir John Tovey (left) C-in-C, Home Fleet, and Vice-Admiral Lyster aboard HMS Indomitable during the King's inspection of the fleet at Scapa Flow, February 1943.
- Born: 27 April 1888; Coleshill, Warwickshire
- Died: 4 August 1957 (aged 69); Charminster, Dorset
- Military career
- Allegiance: United Kingdom
- Branch: Royal Navy
- Service years: 1902–1945
- Rank: Admiral
- Commands: Fifth Sea Lord (1941–42); HMS Glorious (1937–39); 5th Destroyer Flotilla (1933–35); HMS Exmouth (1934–35); HMS Wallace (1933–34); HMS Despatch (1932–33); HMS Danae (1931–32)
- Conflicts: First World War; Gallipoli campaign; Italian front; Second World War; Norwegian campaign; Battle of the Mediterranean; Operation MB8; Battle of Taranto; Operation Pedestal
- Awards: Knight Commander of the Order of the Bath; Commander of the Royal Victorian Order; Commander of the Order of the British Empire; Distinguished Service Order; Mentioned in Despatches; Order of the Crown of Italy

Admiral Sir Arthur Lumley St George Lyster, KCB, CVO, CBE, DSO (27 April 1888 – 4 August 1957) was a Royal Navy officer during the Second World War.

== Naval career ==
After leaving Berkhamsted School, in 1902 Lyster joined HMS Britannia to train for a naval career. In July 1909 he was posted to HMS Drake and later to Grafton. From 1912 he specialized in gunnery, training at HMS Excellent, the gunnery school at Portsmouth, and saw active service in the First World War, his ship fighting at Gallipoli in 1915.

Lyster was appointed a Naval Member of the Ordnance Committee in 1929 and given command of the cruiser HMS Danae in 1932. He went on to command the 5th Destroyer Flotilla in 1933 and the Royal Navy Gunnery School at Chatham in 1935 before becoming director of training and staff duties at the Admiralty in 1936. He was given command of the aircraft carrier HMS Glorious in 1937 and was made Aide-de-camp to the King in 1939.

In the Second World War Lyster was initially rear-admiral in charge of HM Dockyard Scapa Flow and then from 1940 saw further active service as rear-admiral in charge of the Aircraft Carriers in the Mediterranean Fleet. He is notable for drawing up the attack plan for the Battle of Taranto, beginning in 1935 on the instructions of Admiral Sir Dudley Pound, and for putting it into execution in November 1940. In 1941 he was appointed as Fifth Sea Lord and Chief of Naval Air Services and Commander of the Aircraft Carriers in the Home Fleet, with his flag in HMS Illustrious, and in 1942 he commanded air operations during Operation Pedestal, for which he was appointed a Commander of the Order of the British Empire. His last appointment was as Flag Officer, Carrier Training, in 1943 before he retired in 1945.

== Notes ==
Military offices
Preceded by Sir Guy Royle	Fifth Sea Lord; 1941–1942	Succeeded by Vacant (Next held by Sir Denis Boyd)
