= HMS Lowestoft (F103) =

1961 Type 12M or Rothesay-class frigate of the Royal Navy

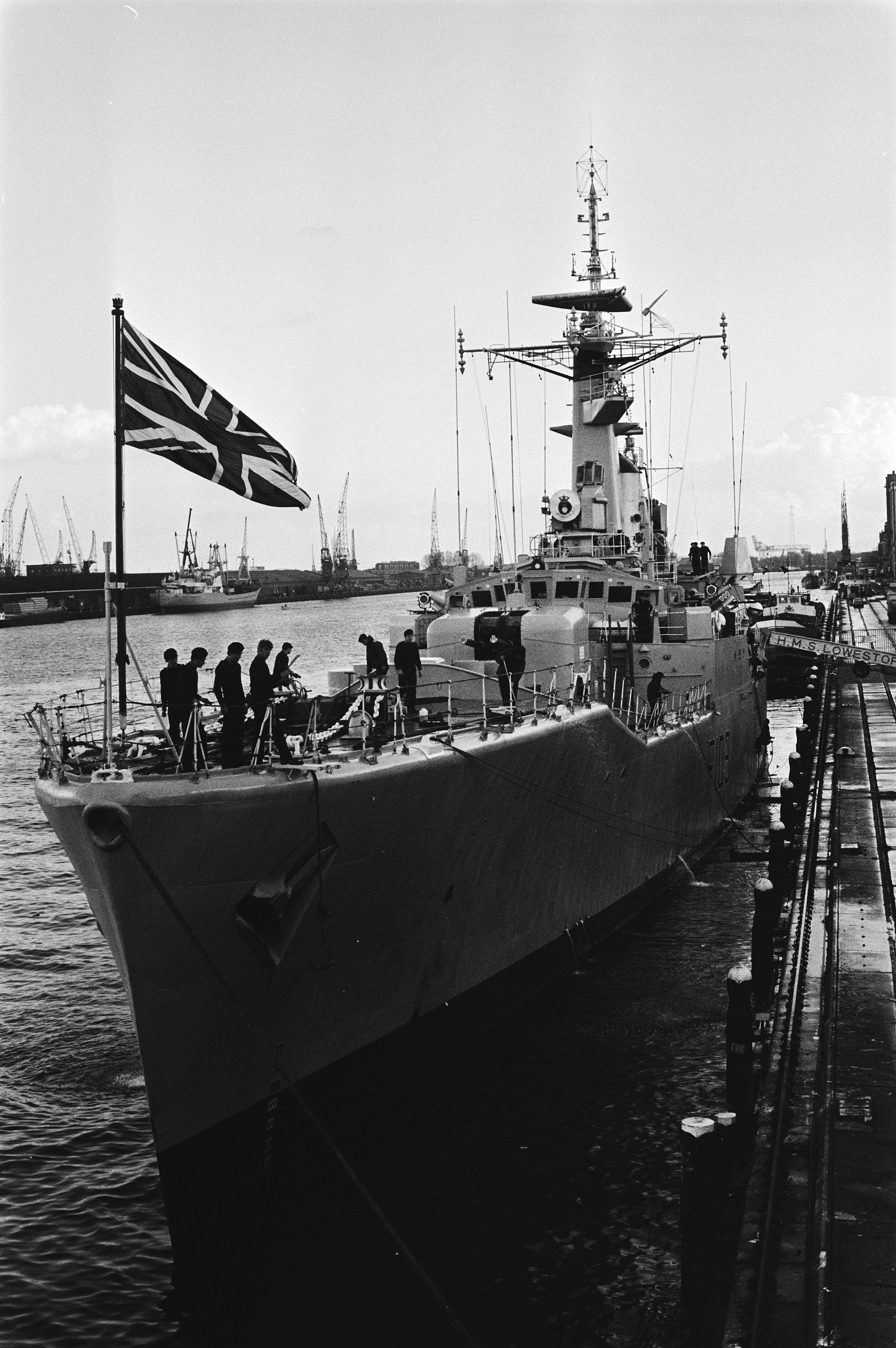
- HMS Lowestoft in 1979

History

United Kingdom
- Name: HMS Lowestoft
- Builder: Alex Stephens & Sons
- Laid down: 9 June 1958
- Launched: 23 June 1960
- Commissioned: 26 September 1961
- Decommissioned: 1985
- Identification: Pennant number: F103
- Fate: Sunk as target 8 June 1986

General characteristics
- Class & type: Rothesay-class frigate
- Displacement: 2,800 tons
- Length: 370 ft (110 m)
- Beam: 41 ft (12 m)
- Draught: 17 ft 4 in (5.28 m)
- Propulsion: 2 × Babcock & Wilcox boilers operating at 550lb sq. in, 850 °F (454 °C) English Electric geared turbines, 2 shafts, 30000 shafts horsepower
- Speed: 30 knots (56 km/h; 35 mph)
- Complement: 235
- Armament: 2 × 4.5-inch dual purpose guns on a Mk VI mounting; 1 × 40 mm (1.6 in) on STAGG mounting; 1 × Limbo mortar Mk 10 mounting
- Aircraft carried: 1 × Wasp helicopter

HMS Lowestoft was a Rothesay-class or Type 12M class anti-submarine frigate of the British Royal Navy. Lowestoft was reconstructed in the late 1960s to largely the same pattern as the third group of Leander-class frigates, with new radar and fire control and a hangar and pad for a Westland Wasp helicopter for longer range, anti-submarine, engagement. In the late 1970s it was converted as the prototype towed array frigate for the Royal Navy, but retained its full armament. Lowestoft was sunk as a target on 8 June 1986 by HMS Conqueror using a Tigerfish torpedo. She was the last Royal Naval target to be sunk still displaying her pennant number.

== Design ==
The Rothesay class was an improved version of the Whitby-class anti-submarine frigate, with nine Rothesays ordered in the 1954–55 shipbuilding programme for the Royal Navy to supplement the six Whitbys.

Lowestoft was 370 feet 0 inches (112.78 m) long overall and 360 feet 0 inches (109.73 m) between perpendiculars, with a beam of 41 feet 0 inches (12.50 m) and a draught of 13 feet 6 inches (4.11 m). The Rothesays were powered by the same Y-100 machinery used by the Whitby-class. Two Babcock & Wilcox water-tube boilers fed steam at 550 pounds per square inch (3,800 kPa) and 850 °F (454 °C) to two sets of geared steam turbines which drove two propeller shafts, fitted with large (2 feet, 0.61 m diameter) slow-turning propellers. The machinery was rated at 30,000 shaft horsepower (22,000 kW), giving a speed of 29.5 knots (54.6 km/h; 33.9 mph). Crew was about 212 officers and men. (Note: Conway's states the crew of a Rothesay ranged from 200–235, while Jane's Fighting Ships 1962–63 states a crew of 200 (9 officers and 191 ratings))

A twin 4.5-inch (113 mm) Mark 6 gun mount was fitted forward, with 350 rounds of ammunition carried. It was originally intended to fit a twin 40 mm L/70 Bofors anti-aircraft mount aft, but in 1957 it was decided to fit the Seacat anti-aircraft missile instead. Seacat was not yet ready, and Yarmouth was completed with a single L/60 40 mm Bofors mount aft as a temporary anti-aircraft armament. The design anti-submarine armament consisted of twelve 21-inch torpedo tubes (eight fixed and two twin rotating mounts) for Mark 20E Bidder homing anti-submarine torpedoes, backed up by two Limbo anti-submarine mortars fitted aft. The Bidder homing torpedoes proved unsuccessful however, being too slow to catch modern submarines, and the torpedo tubes were soon removed.

The ship was fitted with a Type 293Q surface/air search radar on the foremast, with a Type 277 height-finding radar on a short mast forward of the foremast. A Mark 6M fire control system (including a Type 275 radar) for the 4.5-inch guns was mounted above the ship's bridge, while a Type 974 navigation radar was also fitted. The ship's sonar fit consisted of Type 174 search, Type 170 fire control sonar for Limbo and a Type 162 sonar for classifying targets on the sea floor.

Lowestoft was laid down at Alexander Stephen and Sons's Linthouse, Glasgow shipyard on 19 June 1958, was launched on 23 June 1960 and completed on 26 September 1961.

=== Modernisation ===
From 1967 to 1969 Lowestoft underwent a major modernisation, which brought the ship close in capacity to the Leander class. A hangar and flight deck was added aft to allow a Westland Wasp helicopter to be operated, at the expense of one of the Limbo anti-submarine mortars, while a Seacat launcher and the associated GWS20 director was mounted on the hangar roof. Two 20-mm cannons were added either side of the ship's bridge. A MRS3 fire control system replaced the Mark 6M, and its integral Type 903 radar allowed the Type 277 height finder radar to be removed. A Type 993 surface/air-search radar replaced the existing Type 293Q radar, while the ship's defences were enhanced by the addition of the Corvus chaff rocket dispenser.

== Service ==
Lowestoft commissioned on 18 October 1961 and joined the 5th Frigate Squadron in March 1962. Between 1961 and 1963 she was commanded by Raymond Lygo.

On 16 November 1962, a Westland Whirlwind helicopter from the aircraft carrier Hermes with five men aboard, including the politicians Lord Windlesham and John Cronin crashed off St Davids Head. Lowestoft took part in search operations after the crash, and while three survivors (including Cronin) were rescued by helicopters, Lord Windlesham's body was not found. On 4 September 1964, Lowestoft took part in the ceremonies for the opening of the Forth Road Bridge. Later that day, Lowestoft collided with the cruiser Lion, which was moored under the bridge, having also taken place in the ceremony, in foggy conditions. Lowestoft sustained damage to her bows but returned to Rosyth dockyard under her own power. Lowestoft's navigating officer was convicted of negligently hazarding his ship at a court martial and was reprimanded.

In January 1971, Lowestoft joined STANAVFORLANT, the NATO Standing Naval Force Atlantic.

From October 1976 to September 1977, Lowestoft was refitted at Portsmouth for her new role as a trials ship for towed array sonar arrays. She was again refitted, at Falmouth in October 1978. In June 1982, as a result of the Falklands War, she was returned to operational service with the 7th Frigate Squadron after a short refit at Portsmouth, serving as guardship at Ascension Island.

Lowestoft was paid off at Portsmouth on 29 March 1985, and was placed on the Disposal list. Lowestoft was sunk as a target off the Bahamas on 8 June 1986.

== Bibliography ==
- Blackman, Raymond V. B. (1962). Jane's Fighting Ships 1962–63. London: Sampson Low, Marston & Co., Ltd.
- Blackman, Raymond V. B. (1971). Jane's Fighting Ships 1971–72. London: Sampson Low, Marston & Co., Ltd. ISBN 0-354-00096-9.
- Colledge, J. J.; Warlow, Ben (2006) [1969]. Ships of the Royal Navy: The Complete Record of All Fighting Ships of the Royal Navy from the 15th Century to the Present (3rd Rev ed.). London: Chatham Publishing. ISBN 978-1-86176-281-8. OCLC 67375475.
- Critchley, Mike (1992). British Warships Since 1945: Part 5: Frigates. Liskeard, UK: Maritime Press. ISBN 0-907771-13-0.
- Friedman, Norman (2008). British Destroyers & Frigates: The Second World War and After. Barnsley, UK: Seaforth Publishing. ISBN 978-1-84832-015-4.
- Gardiner, Robert; Chumbley, Stephen, eds. (1995). Conway's All The World's Fighting Ships 1947–1995. Annapolis, Maryland, USA: Naval Institute Press. ISBN 1-55750-132-7.
- Marriott, Leo (1983). Royal Navy Frigates 1945–1983. Shepperton, Surrey, UK: Ian Allan Ltd. ISBN 0-7110-1322-5.
- Moore, John, ed. (1979). Jane's Fighting Ships 1979–80. London: Jane's Yearbooks. ISBN 0-354-00587-1.
- Moore, John, ed. (1985). Jane's Fighting Ships 1985–86. London: Jane's Yearbooks. ISBN 0-7106-0814-4.
