= Western Fleet (United Kingdom) =

Former naval fleet of the Royal Navy

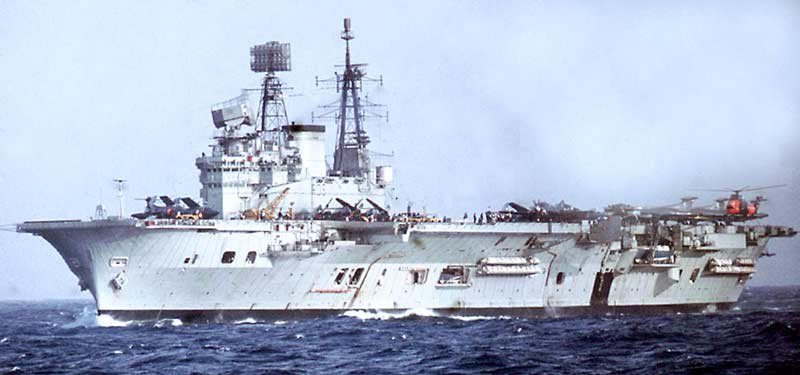
- The aircraft carrier HMS Eagle, Flagship of the Western Fleet
- Active: 5 June 1967 – November 1971
- Country: United Kingdom
- Branch: Royal Navy
- Type: Fleet
- Part of: Admiralty
- Garrison/HQ: Northwood Headquarters, Middlesex

The Western Fleet was a fleet of the Royal Navy from June 1967 to 1971.

== History ==
In 1967 the Home and Mediterranean Fleets were merged to form the Western Fleet. The amalgamated fleet was now responsible for United Kingdom home waters, the North and South Atlantic, and the Mediterranean – all Royal Navy operations “West of Suez”. One of the fleet commander's subordinates was Flag Officer Flotillas, Western Fleet, which Vice Admiral Andrew Lewis filled in 1968–69.

Some details of squadrons in the Western Fleet from 1967 to 1971 can be seen in Graham Watson's work.

In July 1969 fourteen ships of the Western Fleet took part in a Fleet Review and Queen's Colour presentation aboard HMS Eagle in Torbay. The review was challenging due to very inclement weather conditions, with some ships having to sail from Torbay during the night and hundreds of sailors being stranded ashore overnight as it was too rough for small boat transfer.

The headquarters of the Western Fleet was at the Northwood Headquarters in Middlesex. The post of Commander in Chief Western Fleet (abbreviated CINC WF) came with the additional NATO responsibility as Commander in Chief Allied Command Channel. The first Allied Commander-in-Chief Channel was Admiral Sir Arthur Power who was also Commander-in-Chief, Portsmouth, appointed in February 1952. In 1966 it was agreed that the same commander, the Royal Navy's Commander-in-Chief, Western Fleet, should direct the NATO Channel and Eastern Atlantic Commands. As a consequence these functions were combined at his Headquarters in Northwood.

The fleet's existence was quite short in comparison to other fleets of the Royal Navy. The Western Fleet was amalgamated with the Far East Fleet in 1971, and the admiral commanding all the Royal Navy's worldwide forces at Northwood was given the title Commander-in-Chief Fleet (CINCFLEET).

== Commanders in Chief Western Fleet ==
Post holders included:

	Rank	Flag	Name	Term
Commander-in-Chief, Western Fleet
1	Admiral	Admiral - Royal Navy	Sir John Bush	October 1967 – February 1970
2	Admiral	Admiral - Royal Navy	Sir William O’Brien	February 1970 – September 1971
3	Admiral	Admiral - Royal Navy	Sir Edward B. Ashmore	September 1971 – November 1971

The fleet's last commander, Admiral Sir Edward Ashmore, became the first Commander-in-Chief Fleet.

=== Chiefs of Staff, Western Fleet ===
Post holders included:

	Rank	Flag	Name	Term
Chief of Staff, Western Fleet
1	Rear-Admiral	Rear-Admiral - Royal Navy	Edmund N. Poland	October 1967 – December 1967
2	Rear-Admiral	Rear-Admiral - Royal Navy	Peter W.B. Ashmore	December 1967 – December 1969
3	Rear-Admiral	Rear-Admiral - Royal Navy	Ian W. Jamieson	December 1969 – October 1971
4	Vice-Admiral	Vice-Admiral - Royal Navy	John Ernle Pope	October 1971 -November 1971
