= Frank Twiss =

Royal Navy Admiral (1910-1994)

Admiral Sir Frank Twiss KCB KCVO DSC
- Born: 7 July 1910
- Died: 27 January 1994 (aged 83)
- Military career
- Allegiance: United Kingdom
- Branch: Royal Navy
- Service years: 1924–1970
- Rank: Admiral
- Commands: Far East Fleet (1965–67); HMS Ceylon (1957–60)
- Conflicts: Second World War
- Awards: Knight Commander of the Order of the Bath; Knight Commander of the Royal Victorian Order; Distinguished Service Cross

Admiral Sir Frank Roddam Twiss, KCB, KCVO, DSC (7 July 1910 – 27 January 1994) was a senior Royal Navy officer who served as Second Sea Lord and Chief of Naval Personnel from 1967 to 1970. He went on to serve as Gentleman Usher of the Black Rod from 1970 to 1978.

== Naval career ==
The son of Lieutenant Colonel Edward Twiss and his first wife Margaret Edmondson née Tate, he joined the Royal Navy as a cadet in 1924.

During the Second World War, Twiss was Gunnery Officer of HMS Exeter which was badly damaged during the Second Battle of the Java Sea: Twiss was captured and was a Japanese prisoner of war for three years. He was the last captain of HMS Ceylon before she was transferred to the Peruvian Navy on 9 February 1960.

Twiss was appointed Naval Secretary to the First Lord in 1960. Lord Carrington, who had been First Lord of the Admiralty when Twiss was Naval Secretary, later said:

The Naval Secretary was an officer destined to get to the very top—detailed for two years or so to look after promotion to Captain and Flag rank in the Royal Navy and, in the course of doing so, to look after a civilian First Lord, almost invariably ignorant of naval tradition and likely, particularly when visiting the Fleet, to make mistakes of so fundamental and tasteless a character that it would call into question not just the credibility of the Government but our political institutions. For two years Admiral Twiss—quick witted, nimble and tireless—prevented this ex-First Lord from making too much of a fool of himself. In the course of those two years, which I for one greatly enjoyed and during which we travelled a great deal and laughed a great deal, I came to recognize the quality which his senior officers saw in him and which was to serve the Royal Navy and your Lordships' House so well. He did indeed rise to the top of the Royal Navy, despite an occasion which I remember when cruising with him in HMS Tiger. Anxious to show off the skill of his ship's gunnery in front of an old First Lord, he made the unpardonable error of shooting down a very expensive target aircraft, to the cheers of the ship's company but to a stinging rebuke from their Lordships of the Admiralty. I am glad to say that he responded that, since for 30 years he had been trying to hit a target and failed, he could not quite understand the attitude of their Lordships.

Twiss was appointed Flag Officer Flotillas for the Home Fleet in 1962. He went on to be Commander-in-Chief, Far East Fleet in 1965 and Second Sea Lord and Chief of Naval Personnel in 1967. In that capacity he presided over the abolition of the naval rum ration. He retired in 1970.

== Later life ==
In retirement, Twiss served as Gentleman Usher of the Black Rod from 1970 to 1978 and was a member of Commonwealth War Graves Commission from 1970 to 1979.

He retired to East Marsh Farm, Bratton, Wiltshire

== Notes ==
Military offices
Preceded by John Hamilton	Naval Secretary; 1960–1962	Succeeded by John Hayes
Preceded by Sir Desmond Dreyer	Commander-in-Chief, Far East Fleet; 1965–1967	Succeeded by Sir William O'Brien
Preceded by Sir Peter Hill-Norton	Second Sea Lord; 1967–1970	Succeeded by Sir Andrew Lewis
Government offices
Preceded by George Mills	Black Rod; 1970–1978	Succeeded by David House
