= Terence Lewin =

Royal Navy Admiral of the Fleet (1920–1999)

Admiral of the Fleet The Right Honourable The Lord Lewin KG GCB LVO DSC
- Admiral Sir Terence Lewin
- Born: 19 November 1920; Dover, Kent, England
- Died: 23 January 1999 (aged 78); Ufford, Suffolk, England
- Military career
- Allegiance: United Kingdom
- Branch: Royal Navy
- Service years: 1939–1982 (43 years)
- Rank: Admiral of the Fleet
- Commands: Chief of the Defence Staff; First Sea Lord; Naval Home Command; Commander-in-Chief Fleet; HMS Hermes; HMS Tenby; HMS Urchin; HMS Corunna
- Conflicts: Second World War; Falklands War
- Awards: Knight Companion of the Order of the Garter; Knight Grand Cross of the Order of the Bath; Lieutenant of the Royal Victorian Order; Distinguished Service Cross; Mentioned in Despatches (3)

Member of the House of Lords
- Lord Temporal
- Life peerage 19 November 1982 – 23 January 1999

Personal details
- Party: Crossbencher

Admiral of the Fleet Terence Thornton Lewin, Baron Lewin (19 November 1920 – 23 January 1999) was a career Royal Navy officer, best known for his service as Chief of the Defence Staff during the Falklands War in 1982, in which he acted both as chief war planner and senior military advisor for Prime Minister Margaret Thatcher.

Joining the Royal Navy in 1939, Lewin served at sea throughout the Second World War, taking part in numerous campaigns and receiving the Distinguished Service Cross for heroism in 1942. First promoted to command his own ship in 1955, Lewin commanded the destroyer HMS Corunna, the Royal yacht, two frigates and an aircraft carrier before achieving higher command. He served as the 88th First Sea Lord and Chief of the Naval Staff in the late 1970s, fighting to secure a decent wage for British servicemen, helping to win them a 32% pay rise. Lewin rose to become the 9th Chief of the Defence Staff in 1979 and held the office for three years, the first holder of that office to act directly as professional head of the British military, rather than just as Chairman of the Chiefs of Staff Committee.

Lewin retired from the Royal Navy in October 1982, becoming Chairman of the Trustees of the National Maritime Museum and President of the Society for Nautical Research among other roles, also maintaining interest as a military historian. He died in 1999 at the age of 78.

== Naval career ==
Born the son of Eric Lewin and Maggie Lewin (née Falconer) and educated at The Judd School in Tonbridge, where he was head prefect in 1938, Lewin joined the Royal Navy as a cadet in 1939. He was initially posted to the training ship HMS Vindictive but when the Second World War broke out in September 1939 he transferred to the cruiser HMS Belfast and then two months later to the battleship HMS Valiant.

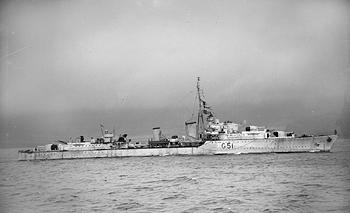
The destroyer HMS Ashanti in which Lewin he took part in the Arctic Convoys during the Second World War

In the Valiant he took part in the Norwegian Campaign in April and May 1940 and then in the attack on the French Fleet at Mers-el-Kébir in July 1940. He transferred to the destroyer HMS Highlander in October 1941 and then to the destroyer HMS Ashanti in January 1942. During a long period of service in the Ashanti he took part in the Arctic Convoys, and having been promoted to lieutenant on 1 July 1942, he took part in Operation Pedestal to relieve Malta in August 1942 and then the allied landings in North Africa in November 1942 before returning to the Arctic Convoys again and finally taking part in the allied landings in Normandy in June 1944. He served with distinction being mentioned in despatches three times and being awarded the Distinguished Service Cross in 1942 for saving the lives of many fellow servicemen when the destroyer HMS Somali was hit by a torpedo.

Lewin attended the gunnery school at HMS Excellent in Spring 1945 and then joined the staff there in May 1945. He was posted to the cruiser HMS Bellona as gunnery officer in April 1946 and, after attending the advanced gunnery course at the Royal Naval College, Greenwich, in 1947, he returned to the staff at HMS Excellent in December. Promoted to lieutenant commander on 1 July 1949, he became gunnery officer of the First Destroyer Flotilla in the Mediterranean Fleet. He rejoined the staff of HMS Excellent in January 1952 and, having been promoted to commander on 31 December 1952, he joined the staff of the Second Sea Lord at the Admiralty in December 1953.

Lewin was given command of the destroyer HMS Corunna in October 1955 before joining HMY Britannia in April 1957 as the executive officer. Promoted to captain on 30 June 1958, he went back to the Admiralty as Assistant Director of the Tactical Ship Requirements and Staff Duties Division in November 1958 and then, having been appointed a Member (fourth class) – later redesignated Lieutenant – of the Royal Victorian Order in the 1959 New Year Honours, he became Assistant Director of the Tactical and Weapons Policy Division in 1960. After attending the Imperial Defence College in 1961, he was appointed Captain (F) of the 17th Frigate Squadron in December 1961 sailing successively in the frigates HMS Urchin and then HMS Tenby. He went back to the Admiralty again as Director of Tactical and Weapons Policy in December 1963 and took command of the aircraft carrier HMS Hermes in May 1966.

=== Flag rank ===
Lewin was appointed Naval Aide-de-Camp to the Queen on 7 July 1967 and promoted to rear admiral on 7 January 1968, on appointment as Assistant Chief of the Naval Staff (Policy) before becoming Flag Officer Second in Command Far East Fleet in August 1969. Promoted to vice admiral on 7 October 1970, he became Vice Chief of the Naval Staff in January 1971. He was appointed Knight Commander of the Order of the Bath in the 1973 New Year Honours. As VCNS two of his most important projects were the approval of the Sea Harrier and the beginning of "group deployments," as the UK's far-flung naval forces had mostly disappeared. He was promoted to full admiral on 1 December 1973, on appointment as Commander-in-Chief Fleet and NATO Commander-in-Chief, Channel and Commander-in-Chief Eastern Atlantic and became Commander-in-Chief Naval Home Command in November 1975 before being advanced to Knight Grand Cross of the Order of the Bath in the 1976 Birthday Honours.

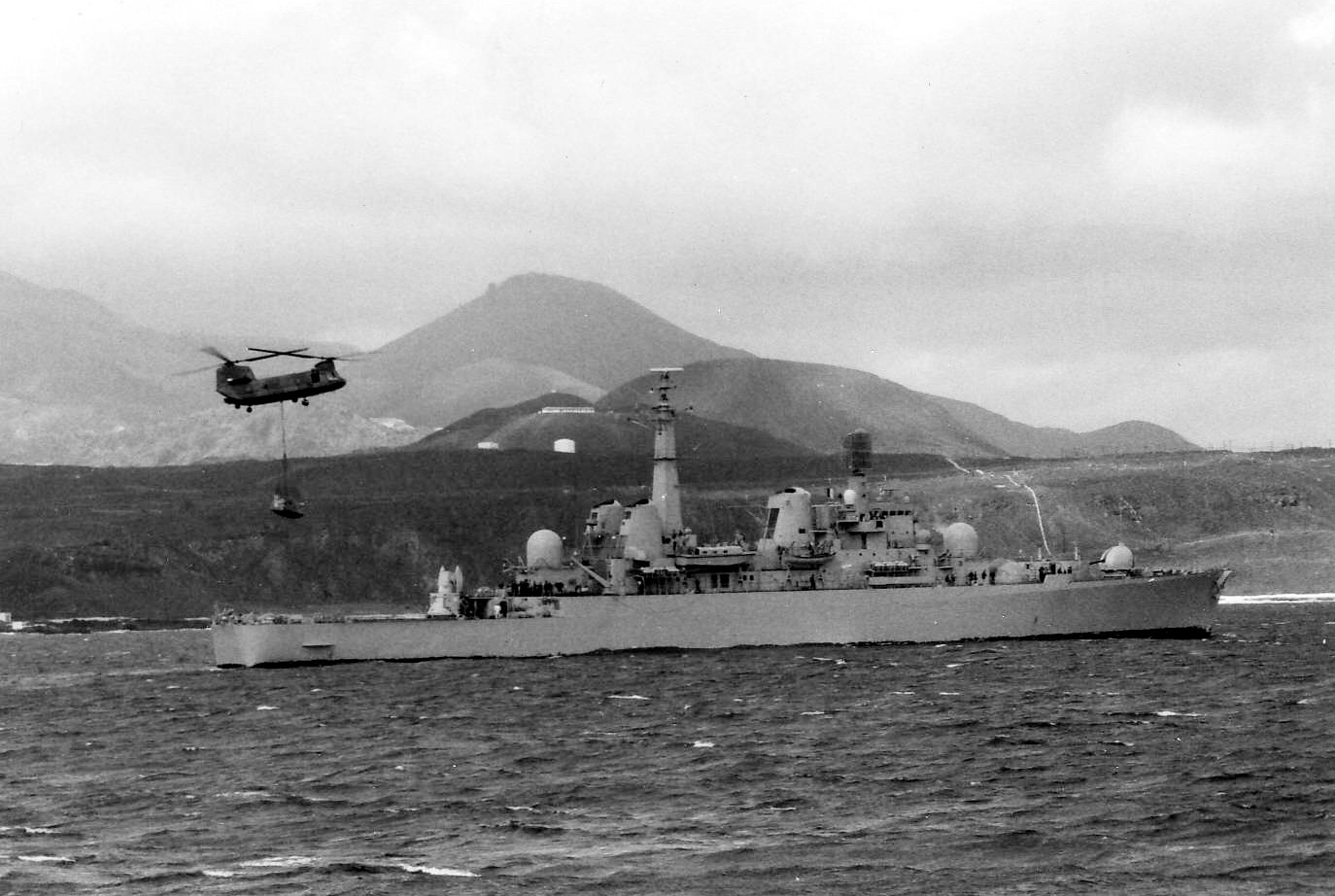
Supplies being delivered to the destroyer HMS Bristol by helicopter during a stopover at Ascension Island on the ship's voyage to take part in the Falklands War

Lewin was appointed First Sea Lord and Chief of Naval Staff on 1 March 1977. In that role he worked hard to secure a decent wage for servicemen and helped win them a 32% pay rise. Promoted to Admiral of the Fleet on 6 July 1979, he went on to be Chief of the Defence Staff in September 1979 and served as a member of the War Cabinet during the Falklands War giving Prime Minister Margaret Thatcher his resolute support when losses began to be suffered.

Lewin was the first Chief of Defence Staff to act as professional head of the Armed Forces rather than just Chairman of the Chiefs of Staff Committee. He was created a life peer, as Baron Lewin, of Greenwich in Greater London in October 1982 on his retirement.

== Later life ==
In retirement, Lewin became Chairman of the Trustees of the National Maritime Museum, President of the Society for Nautical Research, a Liveryman of the Skinners' Company and of the Shipwrights' Company and an elder brother of Trinity House. His interests included military history: he was an expert on the life of Captain Cook. He was appointed a Knight Companion of the Order of the Garter in April 1983. He died at his home at Ufford in Suffolk on 23 January 1999.

== Family ==
In 1944, Lewin married Jane Branch-Evans; they had two sons and a daughter.

== Coat of Arms ==
Coat of arms of Terence Lewin, Baron Lewin, KG, GCB, LVO, DSC
Coronet Coronet of a Baron Crest Out of a Naval Crown Azure, a Lion rampant in trian aspect Or, on its head a Baron's Coronet and Cap of Estate proper, brandishing in the dexter paw a Sword proper, Hilt, Knuckle Guard and Pommel in the form of an eagle's head Gold. Escutcheon Quarterly Gules and Azure, three Boars' Heads, two and one, couped Or, tusked Argent, on a Chief barry wavy of four Bleu Celeste and Argent, a Naval Gun circa 1800 proper, mounted on its Carriage Gold. Supporters Dexter: an Able Seaman of Her Majesty's Ship Victory, wearing the South Atlantic Medal proper. Sinister: a Royal Marine, wearing the South Atlantic Medal proper. The whole upon a Compartment comprising a Grassy Mount with Outcrops of Rock proper, and having on each side a Sea Inlet barry wavy Argent and Azure. Motto FLEXIBLE BUT FIRM OF PURPOSE Other elements Order of the Garter circlet bearing the inscription HONI SOIT QUI MAL Y PENSE Symbolism The three boar's heads are taken from the arms of Sir Andrew Judde, Lord Mayor of London in 1550/1, as a tribute to the Judd School in Tonbridge where Lord Lewin was educated. The red and blue background echoes the arms of an earlier Lewin family. The naval cannon is an appropriate emblem for a naval officer who has seen active service, and it is set against a pattern of blue and white waves for the sea.

== Sources ==
- Heathcote, Tony (2002). The British Admirals of the Fleet 1734 – 1995. Pen & Sword Ltd. ISBN 0-85052-835-6.
- Rear-Admiral Richard Hill (2000). Lewin of Greenwich. Weidenfeld Military. ISBN 978-0-304-35329-3.
- Prince, Stephen. "British command and control in the Falklands Campaign." Defense & Security Analysis 18.4 (2002): 333–349.

Military offices
Preceded by Sir Edward Ashmore	Vice Chief of the Naval Staff; 1971–1973	Succeeded by Sir John Treacher
Preceded by Sir Edward Ashmore	Commander-in-Chief Fleet; 1973–1975	Succeeded by Sir John Treacher
Preceded by Sir Derek Empson	Commander-in-Chief Naval Home Command; 1975–1976	Succeeded by Sir David Williams
Preceded by Sir Edward Ashmore	First Sea Lord; 1977–1979	Succeeded by Sir Henry Leach
Preceded by Sir Neil Cameron	Chief of the Defence Staff; 1979–1982	Succeeded by Sir Edwin Bramall
