= Nigel Henderson =

Royal Navy Admiral (1909–1993)

Admiral Sir Nigel Henderson GBE KCB DL
- Henderson in 1957
- Born: 1 August 1909
- Died: 2 August 1993 (aged 84)
- Military career
- Allegiance: United Kingdom
- Branch: Royal Navy
- Service years: 1927–1971
- Rank: Admiral
- Commands: Chairman of the NATO Military Committee (1968–71); Plymouth Command (1962–65); Director General of Training (1960–62); HMS Kenya (1955); Royal Naval Air Station at Bramcote (1952); HMS Protector (1951)
- Conflicts: Second World War
- Awards: Knight Grand Cross of the Order of the British Empire; Knight Commander of the Order of the Bath

Admiral Sir Nigel Stuart Henderson, GBE, KCB, DL (1 August 1909 – 2 August 1993) was a Royal Navy officer who served as Chairman of the NATO Military Committee from 1968 to 1971.

== Naval career ==
Henderson joined the Royal Navy in 1927. He served in the Second World War as a gunnery officer. After the war he became Naval Attaché in Rome and then, from 1951, commanded the patrol vessel HMS Protector.

Henderson was appointed Commanding Officer at the Royal Naval Air Station at Bramcote in 1952 and was Captain of the cruiser HMS Kenya from 1955. He became Vice Naval Deputy and then Naval Deputy to the Supreme Allied Commander Europe in 1957 and Director General of Training at the Admiralty in 1960. In 1962 he was made Commander-in-Chief, Plymouth, and on 14 August 1963 he was promoted to the rank of admiral. He was made Head of the British Defence Staff in Washington, D.C. and UK Military Representative to NATO in 1965 and then Chairman of the NATO Military Committee in 1968. He retired in 1971.

Writing in 1974 Henderson expressed concern over a general lack of awareness about "Western Europe and indeed of all NATO countries being dependent very largely on Middle East oil".

== Personal life ==
Henderson married Catherine Mary Maitland in 1939. They had three children, a son and two daughters. In 1959 Lady Henderson inherited the estate of Hensol House near Castle Douglas from her godmother Helen, Marchioness of Ailsa. The couple retired there in 1971.

In retirement Henderson spearheaded the effort to restore the Scottish birthplace of John Paul Jones at Arbigland back to its original 1747 condition. He was also a Deputy Lieutenant of the Stewartry of Kirkcudbright and a Patron of the Ten Tors Challenge held each year on Dartmoor.

Military offices
Preceded by Sir Charles Madden	Commander-in-Chief, Plymouth; 1962–1965	Succeeded by Sir Fitzroy Talbot
Preceded by Sir Michael West	Head of the British Defence Staff in Washington, D.C. 1965–1968	Succeeded by Sir George Lea
Preceded by Sir Michael West	UK Military Representative to NATO; 1965–1968	Succeeded by Sir David Lee
Preceded by C.P. de Cumont	Chairman of the NATO Military Committee; 1968–1971	Succeeded by Johannes Steinhoff
Honorary titles
Preceded by Sir Alexander Bingley	Rear-Admiral of the United Kingdom; 1973–1976	Succeeded by Sir John Bush
Preceded by Sir Deric Holland-Martin	Vice-Admiral of the United Kingdom; 1976–1979	Succeeded by Sir John Bush
