= John Bush (Royal Navy officer) =

Royal Navy Admiral (1914–2013)

Admiral Sir John Bush GCB DSC**
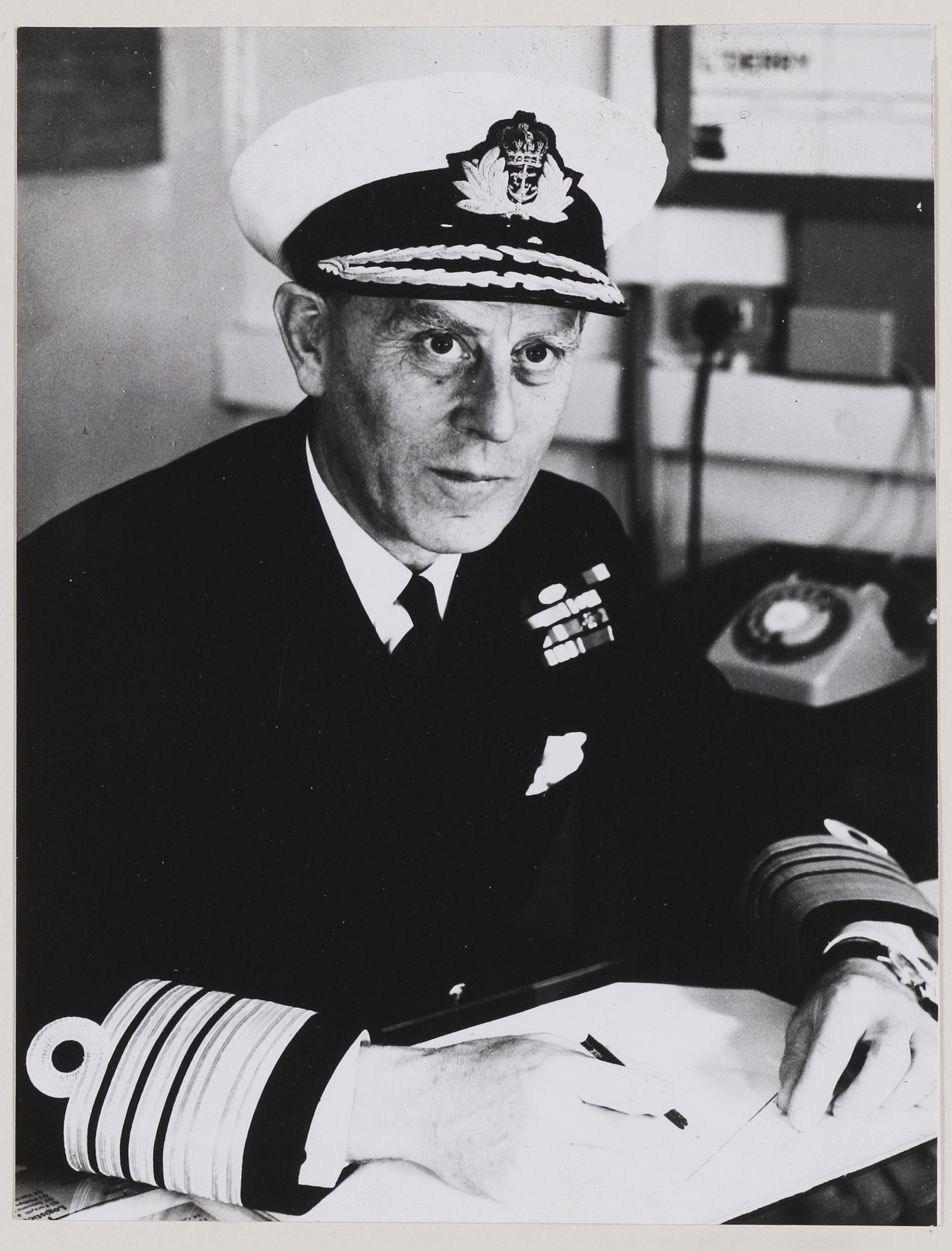
- Sir John Bush in 1969
- Born: 1 November 1914
- Died: 10 May 2013 (aged 98)
- Relatives: Knight Grand Cross of the Order of the Bath; Distinguished Service Cross & two bars
- Military career
- Allegiance: United Kingdom
- Branch: Royal Navy
- Rank: Admiral
- Commands: 6th Frigate Squadron; Western Fleet
- Conflicts: World War II

Admiral Sir John Fitzroy Duyland Bush GCB DSC** (1 November 1914 – 10 May 2013) was a British Royal Navy officer who served as Commander-in-Chief Western Fleet.

== Naval career ==
Educated at Clifton College, Bush was commissioned into the Royal Navy and served in World War II. He became Commanding officer of the destroyer HMS Undine as well as Captain of the 6th Frigate Squadron in 1955, Flag Officer (Flotillas) in the Mediterranean Fleet in 1961 and then Commander of the British Naval staff in Washington, D.C. in 1962.

In January 1967 he led a British delegation to South Africa to renegotiate the Simonstown Agreement.

He was appointed Vice Chief of the Naval Staff in 1965 and the first Commander-in-Chief Western Fleet in 1967. He retired in 1970.

In retirement he held the posts of Rear-Admiral and then Vice-Admiral of the United Kingdom. He was one of the inaugural members of East Hampshire District Council after its creation in 1973. He died on 10 May 2013.

== Family ==
In 1938 he married Ruth Kennedy Horsey. They went on to have three sons and two daughters.

Military offices
Preceded by Sir John Frewen	Vice Chief of the Naval Staff; 1965–1967	Succeeded by Sir Peter Hill-Norton
Preceded by New Post	Commander-in-Chief Western Fleet; 1967–1970	Succeeded by Sir William O'Brien
Honorary titles
Preceded by Sir Nigel Henderson	Rear-Admiral of the United Kingdom; 1976–1979	Succeeded by Sir William O'Brien
Preceded by Sir Nigel Henderson	Vice-Admiral of the United Kingdom; 1979–1984	Succeeded by Sir William O'Brien
