= HMS Tenby (F65) =

1957 Type 12 or Whitby-class frigate of the Royal Navy

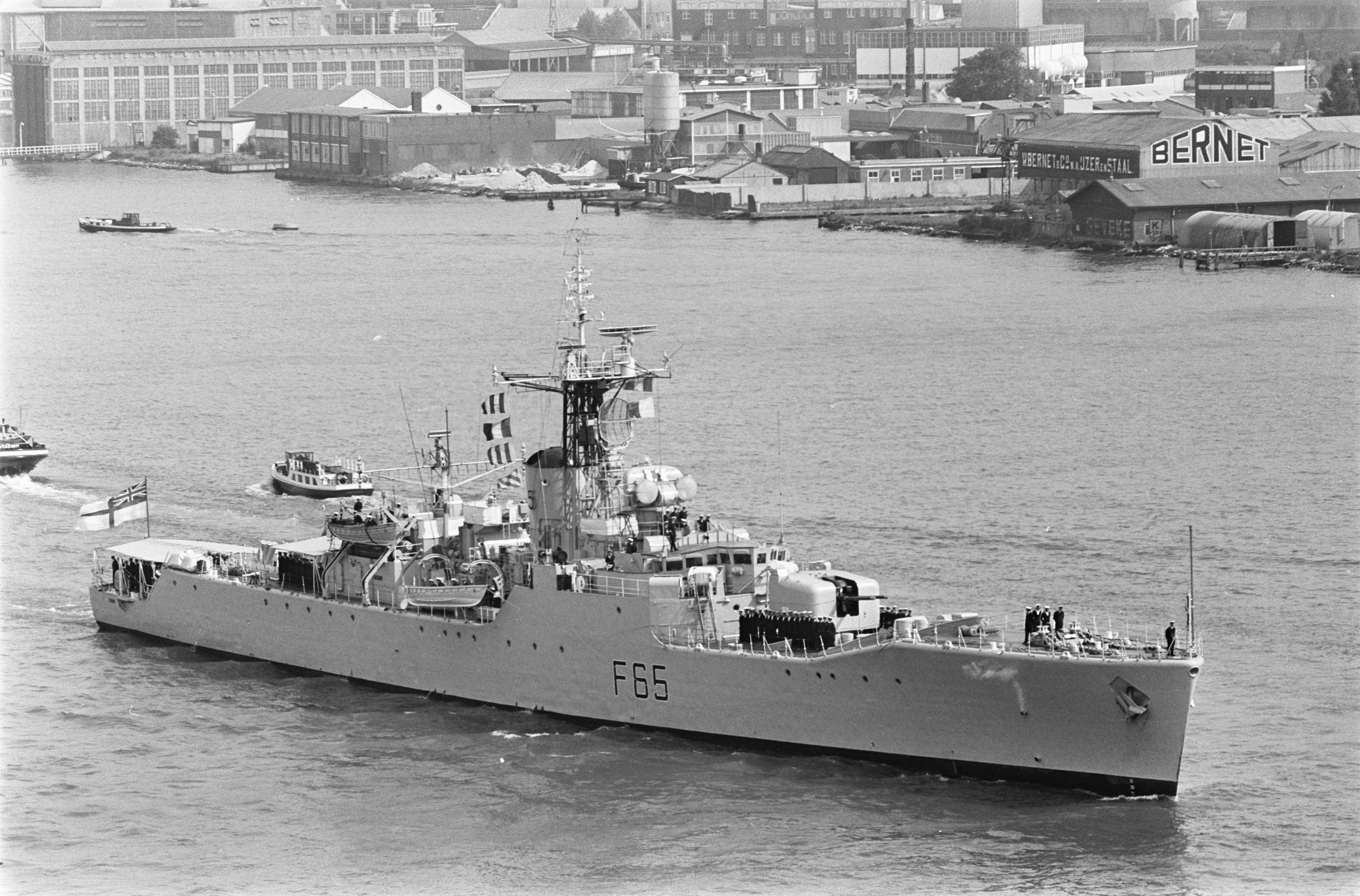
- HMS Tenby, May 1969

History

United Kingdom
- Name: Tenby
- Ordered: 6 March 1951
- Builder: Cammell Laird and Co Ltd, Birkenhead
- Laid down: 23 June 1953
- Launched: 4 October 1955
- Commissioned: 18 December 1957
- Decommissioned: 1972
- Identification: Pennant number: F65
- Fate: Sold to Pakistan Navy in 1975 but not taken up; Sold for scrapping in 1977

General characteristics
- Class & type: Whitby-class frigate
- Displacement: 2,150 tons (2,185 tonnes); 2,560 tons full load (2,600 tonnes)
- Length: 360 ft (109.7 m) w/l; 370 ft (112.8 m) o/a
- Beam: 41 ft (12.5 m)
- Draught: 17 ft (5.18 m)
- Propulsion: Y-100 plant; 2 Babcock & Wilcox boilers, 2 English Electric steam turbines, 2 shafts, 30,000 shp (22 MW)
- Speed: 30 kn (56 km/h)
- Range: 370 tons oil fuel, 4,200 nmi (7,780 km) at 12 knots (22 km/h)
- Complement: 152, later 225
- Sensors & processing systems: Radar Type 293Q target indication.; Radar Type 277Q height finding (later removed); Radar Type 275 fire control on director Mark 6M; Radar Type 262 fire control on STAAG; Radar Type 974 navigation; Type 1010 Cossor Mark 10 IFF; Sonar Type 174 search; Sonar Type 162 target classification; Sonar Type 170 attack
- Armament: 1 × twin 4.5 in (114 mm) gun Mark 6; 1 × twin 40 mm Bofors gun Mark 2 STAAG, later; 1 × single 40 mm Bofors gun Mark 7; 2 × Limbo A/S mortar Mark 10; 12 × 21 in A/S torpedo tubes (removed or never shipped)

HMS Tenby was a Whitby-class or Type 12 anti-submarine frigate of the Royal Navy of the United Kingdom.

== Design ==
The Whitbys were designed as specialist anti-submarine warships, intended to counter fast modern diesel-electric submarines. As such, the design was required to reach a speed of at least 27 knots (31 mph; 50 km/h), maintaining high speed in rough weather conditions and have a range of 4,500 nautical miles (5,200 mi; 8,300 km) at 12 knots (14 mph; 22 km/h). To meet these requirements, the Type 12s had a new hull form and, unlike the contemporary Type 41 anti-aircraft and Type 61 air direction frigates, were powered by steam turbines.

Tenby was 370 feet 0 inches (112.78 m) long overall and 360 feet 0 inches (109.73 m) at the waterline, with a beam of 41 feet 0 inches (12.50 m) and a draught of 11 feet 0 inches (3.35 m) forward and 13 feet 0 inches (3.96 m) at the propellers. The ships were powered by the new Y-100 machinery in which the ship's boilers and steam turbines were designed as a closely integrated set of machinery to increase efficiency. Two Babcock & Wilcox water-tube boilers fed steam at 550 pounds per square inch (3,800 kPa) and 850 °F (454 °C) to two sets of geared steam turbines which drove two propeller shafts, fitted with large (2 feet (0.61 m) diameter) slow-turning propellers. The machinery was rated at 30,000 shaft horsepower (22,000 kW), giving a speed of 29 knots (33 mph; 54 km/h). Crew was about 189 when operated as a leader and 152 as an ordinary ship.

A twin 4.5-inch (113 mm) Mark 6 gun mount was fitted forward, with 350 rounds of ammunition carried, with close-in armament of a stabilised twin Bofors 40 mm L/60 gun (STAAG, Stabilised Tachymetric Anti-Aircraft Gun) mount aft. The design anti-submarine armament consisted of twelve 21-inch torpedo-tubes (eight fixed and two twin rotating mounts) for Mark 20E Bidder homing anti-submarine torpedoes, backed up by two Limbo anti-submarine mortars fitted aft. The Bidder homing torpedoes proved unsuccessful however, being too slow to catch modern submarines, and the torpedo tubes were soon removed.

The ship was fitted with a Type 293Q surface/air search radar on the foremast, with a Type 277 height-finding radar on a short mast forward of the foremast. A Mark 6M fire control system (including a Type 275 radar) for the 4.5 inch guns was mounted above the ship's bridge, while a Type 974 navigation radar was also fitted. The ship's sonar fit consisted of Type 174 search, Type 170 fire control sonar for Limbo and a Type 162 sonar for classifying targets on the sea floor.

== History ==
In 1962-1963 she was commanded by Captain T Lewin.

By the early 1970s, in the latter part of her career, she was one of three frigates which formed the Dartmouth Training Squadron and was used for the training of Royal Navy Officer Cadets before being promoted to Midshipmen.

== In popular culture ==
The fake military funeral of Commander James Bond in the 1967 film You Only Live Twice was filmed on board this ship, which was near Gibraltar at that time. In the film however, it was portrayed as being in Hong Kong.

== Decommissioning ==
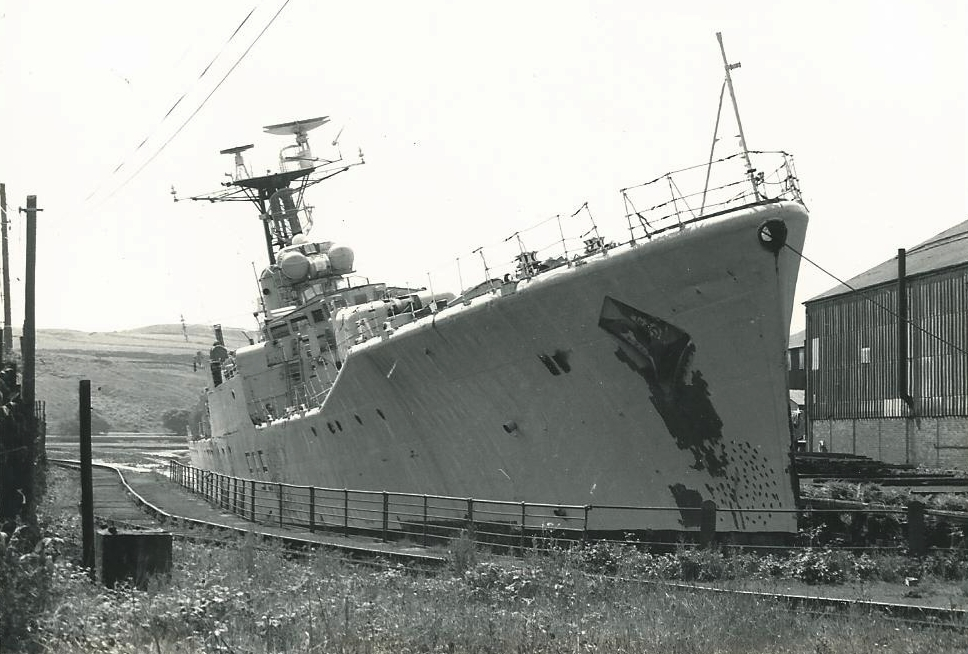
HMS Tenby at Thos. W. Ward's Scrapyard, Briton Ferry, 1979

She was paid off into the reserve fleet on 8 December 1972 with the final ship's company leaving on 28 February 1973.

She spent four years laid up at Devonport prior to being sold to Thos. W. Ward for breaking up at Briton Ferry, the proposed sale to Pakistan being cancelled.
