= Edward Ashmore =

Royal Navy Admiral of the Fleet (1919–2016)

Admiral of the Fleet Sir Edward Ashmore GCB DSC
- Sir Edward Ashmore
- Born: 11 December 1919; Queenstown, Ireland
- Died: 28 April 2016 (aged 96)
- Military career
- Allegiance: United Kingdom
- Branch: Royal Navy
- Service years: 1938–1977
- Rank: Admiral of the Fleet
- Commands: Acting Chief of the Defence Staff; First Sea Lord; Commander-in-Chief Fleet; Western Fleet; HMS Blackpool; HMS Alert
- Conflicts: Second World War; Cold War; Third Cod War
- Awards: Knight Grand Cross of the Order of the Bath; Distinguished Service Cross; Mentioned in Despatches

Admiral of the Fleet Sir Edward Beckwith Ashmore, GCB, DSC (11 December 1919 – 28 April 2016) was a senior Royal Navy officer. He saw active service in the Second World War and later commanded two frigates before achieving high command in the Navy. He served as First Sea Lord and Chief of the Naval Staff in the mid-1970s and in that role he advised the incoming Labour government on a major defence review and on the implications of the Turkish invasion of Cyprus. He went on to be acting Chief of the Defence Staff, serving briefly in a caretaker capacity following the death of his predecessor.

== Naval career ==
Born the son of Vice Admiral Leslie Haliburton Ashmore by his marriage to Tamara Vasilevna Schutt, and brother of Vice Admiral Sir Peter Ashmore, who was the Master of the Household to HM the Queen from 1973 to 1986, Ashmore was educated at various schools including Yardley Court in Kent and then at the Royal Naval College, Dartmouth. He joined the Royal Navy as a cadet in September 1933 and was posted to the cruiser HMS Frobisher in May 1937 and then, having been promoted to midshipman, to the battleship HMS Rodney in September 1937. He transferred to the cruiser HMS Birmingham on the China Station January 1938 and was promoted to sub-lieutenant on 1 September 1939. He was also involved in a confrontation with the Imperial Japanese Navy at Qingdao over the SS Vincent de Paul in January 1939.

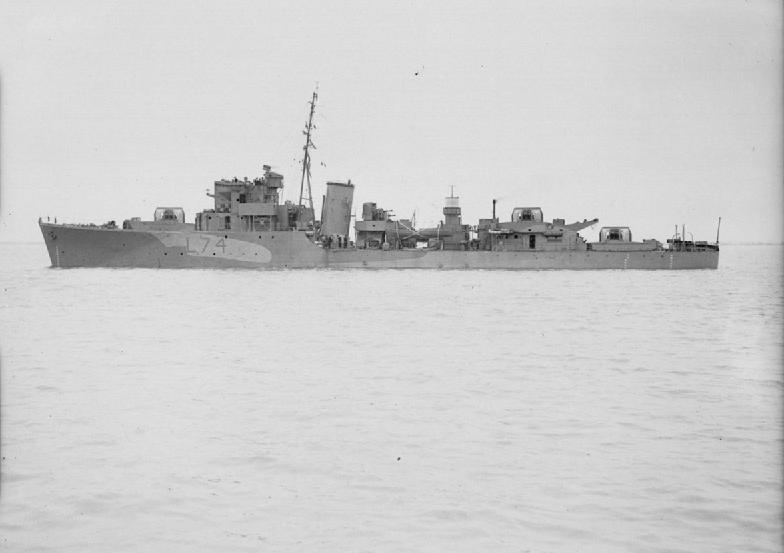
The destroyer HMS Middleton in which Ashmore took part in the Arctic Convoys during the Second World War

Ashmore was posted to the destroyer HMS Jupiter in January 1940, early in the Second World War, and saw action during the Norwegian Campaign. Promoted to lieutenant on 1 January 1941, he transferred to the destroyer HMS Middleton in June 1941 and took part in the Arctic Convoys and as well as a convoy to relieve Malta in June 1942: it was during this latter operation that he was awarded the Distinguished Service Cross. In August 1942 he went to Russia to help evacuate the survivors of the ill-fated Convoy PQ 17. He attended signals and radar training courses in 1943 and was posted to the staff of the Commander-in-Chief, Home Fleet, as Fleet Wireless Assistant in December 1943. He became Squadron Signal Officer for the 4th Cruiser Squadron in September 1944 and helped provide naval support during the Battle of Okinawa in April 1945. In that capacity he experienced a Kamikaze air attack in July 1945 and observed the signing of the Japanese Instrument of Surrender on USS Missouri in September 1945. He was mentioned in despatches for distinguished service in the Far East on 11 June 1946.

After the war Ashmore qualified as a Russian interpreter and became Assistant Naval Attache in Moscow in 1946. He joined the staff of the Royal Navy Signals School in September 1947 and, having been promoted to lieutenant commander on 1 January 1948, he attended the Royal Naval Staff College in 1949. He was appointed Squadron Communications Officer for the 3rd Aircraft Carrier Squadron in October 1949 and, having been promoted to commander on 31 December 1950, was posted to the Admiralty as Assistant Director (Communications) in the Radio Equipment Department. He was given command of the frigate HMS Alert in June 1953 and returned to the Royal Navy Signals School as Second-in-Command in October 1954 before being promoted to captain on 30 June 1955. He attended the Joint Service Staff College before becoming Chief Signals Officer at the Headquarters of the Commander-in-Chief Allied Forces Northern Europe in Oslo. He went on to be Captain (F) of the 6th Frigate Squadron sailing in the frigate HMS Blackpool in October 1958.

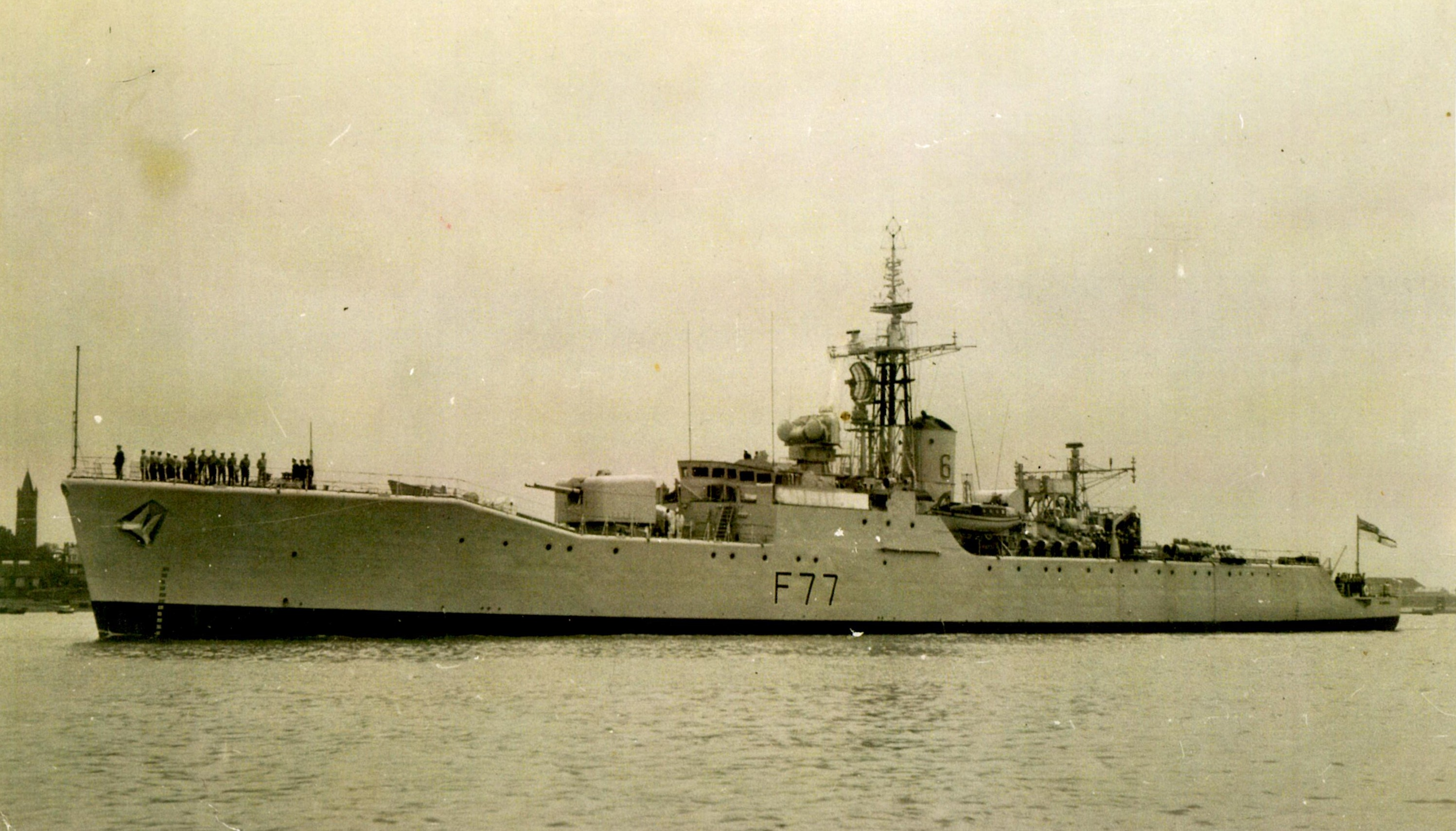
The frigate HMS Blackpool which Ashmore commanded in the late 1950s

Ashmore became Deputy Director of Naval Plans at the Admiralty in June 1960, Director of Naval Plans there in November 1960 and then Chairman of the Service Directors of Plans at the Ministry of Defence in December 1961. Promoted to commodore in March 1962, he became Commander of British Forces in the Caribbean and Senior Naval Officer West Indies in July 1963.

=== Flag rank ===
Ashmore was appointed Naval Aide-de-Camp to the Queen on 7 July 1964 and promoted to rear admiral on appointment as Assistant Chief of Defence Staff (Signals) on 7 January 1965. Appointed a Companion of the Order of the Bath in the 1966 Birthday Honours, he became Flag Officer Second in Command Far East Fleet based in Singapore in April 1967. Promoted to vice admiral on 24 July 1968, he went on to be Vice Chief of the Naval Staff in December 1968 and, having been promoted to the rank of full admiral on 4 November 1970, he was advanced to Knight Commander of the Order of the Bath in the 1971 New Year Honours. He became the last Commander-in-Chief Western Fleet in September 1971 and then the first Commander-in-Chief Fleet and NATO Commander-in-Chief, Channel and Commander-in-Chief Eastern Atlantic, as a result of the amalgamation of the Far East Fleet and the Western Fleet into the a single Fleet Command in November 1971. He was advanced to Knight Grand Cross of the Order of the Bath in the 1974 New Year Honours.

Ashmore became First Sea Lord and Chief of Naval Staff on 1 March 1974. In that role he advised the incoming Labour Government on a major defence review and on the implications of the Turkish invasion of Cyprus in July 1974. He was promoted to Admiral of the Fleet on 9 February 1977 and was appointed Chief of the Defence Staff that month serving in a caretaker capacity (following the death of his predecessor) before retiring at the end of August 1977.

== Later career ==
In retirement he became a Director of Racal Electronics and a Governor of Suttons Hospital in London as well as Chairman of the Royal Navy Club of 1765 & 1785 (United 1889). He described his interests as the "usual".

== Personal life ==
In 1942, he married Elizabeth Mary Doveton Sturdee, daughter of Rear Admiral Sir Lionel Sturdee, 2nd Baronet. They had together one son and two daughters. Ashmore died in April 2016 aged 96.

== Sources ==
- Heathcote, Tony (2002). The British Admirals of the Fleet 1734 – 1995. Pen & Sword Ltd. ISBN 0-85052-835-6.

Military offices
Preceded by Sir Peter Hill-Norton	Vice Chief of the Naval Staff; 1969–1971	Succeeded by Sir Terence Lewin
Preceded by Sir William O'Brien	Commander-in-Chief Western Fleet; 1971	Post disbanded
New title	Commander-in-Chief Fleet; 1971–1973	Succeeded by Sir Terence Lewin
Preceded by Sir Michael Pollock	First Sea Lord; 1974–1977	Succeeded by Sir Terence Lewin
Preceded by Sir Andrew Humphrey	Chief of the Defence Staff; 1977	Succeeded by Sir Neil Cameron
