= John Moresby =

English Royal Navy Admiral (1830–1922)

Admiral John Moresby
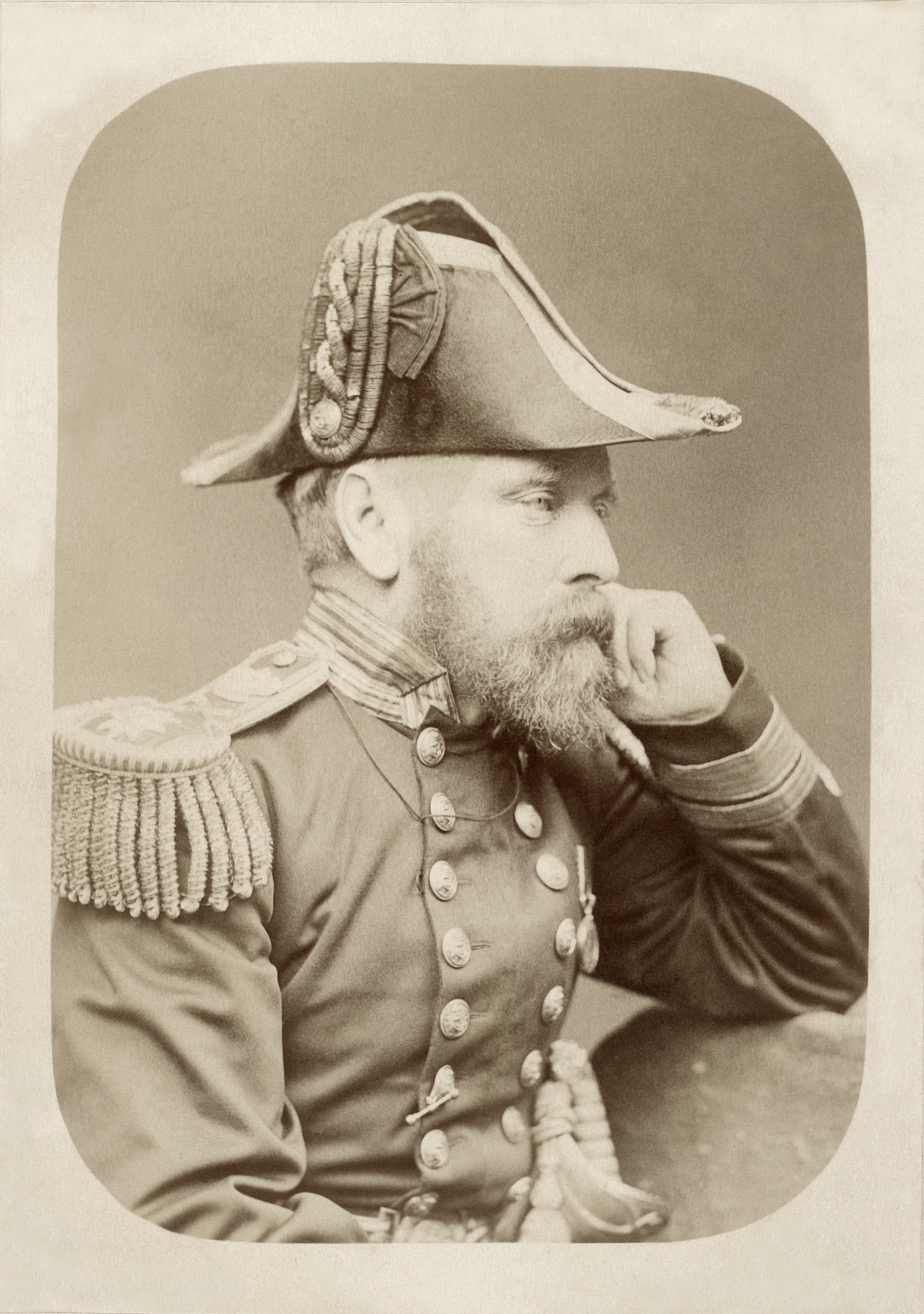
- Born: 15 March 1830; Allerford, Somerset, England
- Died: 12 July 1922 (aged 92); Fareham, Hampshire, England
- Relatives: Fairfax Moresby (father); L. Adams Beck (daughter)
- Military career
- Allegiance: United Kingdom
- Branch: Royal Navy
- Rank: Admiral
- Commands: HMS Endymion

Admiral John Moresby (15 March 1830 – 12 July 1922) was a British naval officer who explored the coast of New Guinea and was the first European to discover the site of Port Moresby.

== Life and career ==
Moresby was born in Allerford, Somerset, England, the son of Eliza Louisa and Admiral of the Fleet Sir Fairfax Moresby. He joined the navy at an early age as a Volunteer 1st Class in HMS Victor.

On 23 January 1871, he was appointed to the command of the 1,031 ton paddle steamer cruiser HMS Basilisk, in which he made hydrological surveys around eastern New Guinea. During the survey of the southern coast he discovered the harbour which he named Fairfax after his father. The town established there, based on already existing native villages (principally Hanuabada) was named Port Moresby and is now the nation's capital.

Moresby was also searching for a shorter route between Australia and China and on the eastern tip of the island he discovered the China Strait. He continued exploring along the north west coast as far as the Huon Gulf.

Basilisk, under the command of Moresby, visited the Ellice Islands in July 1872.

On 29 September 1876, Moresby took command of HMS Endymion, remaining in this position until 6 March 1878, when he was appointed Captain-in-Charge of the Royal Naval Dockyard in the Imperial fortress colony of Bermuda.

He was later promoted to admiral and died on 12 July 1922 in Fareham, Hampshire, England.

== Family ==
In 1859 he married Jane Willis Scott (? – 1876) of Queenstown, Ireland and had six children:

- Walter Halliday Moresby CBE (9 November 1861 – 24 April 1951), lawyer and spy
- Elizabeth Louisa Moresby (1862 – 3 January 1931), became a well-known writer under a variety of pseudonyms, married Edward Western Hodgkinson and Ralph Coker Adams Beck
  - Harry Drake Hodgkinson
- Ethel Fortescue Moresby (1865 – ?), married Frederick Haines
- Georgina Moresby (23 July 1867 - 1953?), married Peyton Temple Mackeson (1854–1918)
  - Donald Fairfax Mackeson
- Hilda Fairfax Moresby (16 December 1868 – 16 August 1893), accidentally drowned
- Gladys Moresby (5 April 1870 - ?)

During the 1890s he lived on Tower Street in Chichester.

== Works ==
- New Guinea and Polynesia..., John Moresby, John Murray 1876 (reprinted 2002, Elibron Classics, ISBN 1-4021-8798-X)
- Two Admirals, Admiral of the Fleet, Sir Fairfax Moresby (1786–1877), and His Son, John Moresby. A Record of Life and Service in the British Navy for a Hundred Years, John Moresby, Murray, London 1909
