= William O'Brien (Royal Navy officer) =

Royal Navy Admiral (1916-2016)

Admiral Sir William O'Brien KCB DSC
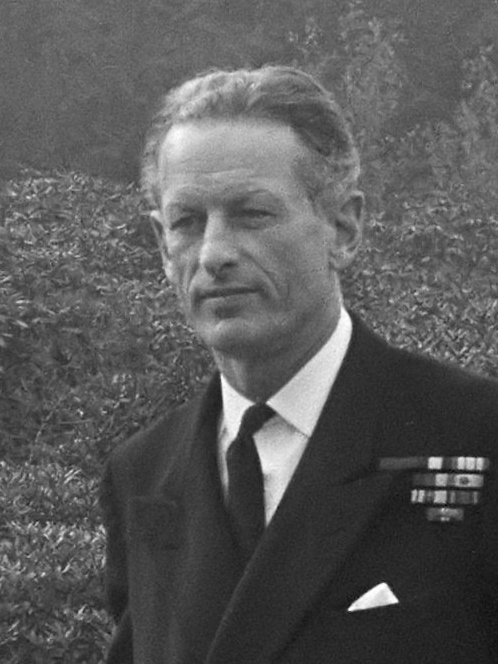
- Admiral Sir William O'Brien in 1970
- Born: 13 November 1916; Faversham, Kent, England
- Died: 19 February 2016 (aged 99)
- Military career
- Allegiance: United Kingdom
- Branch: Royal Navy
- Service years: 1930–1971
- Rank: Admiral
- Commands: Western Fleet (1970–71); Far East Fleet (1967–69); Flag Officer, Aircraft Carriers (1966–67); HMS Hermes (1961–64); 8th Destroyer Squadron (1958–59); HMS Cheviot (1958–59); HMS Manxman (1955–57); HMS Venus (1948–49); HMS Cottesmore (1943–44)
- Conflicts: Second World War
- Awards: Knight Commander of the Order of the Bath; Distinguished Service Cross; Mentioned in Despatches (2)

Admiral Sir William Donough O'Brien, KCB, DSC (13 November 1916 – 19 February 2016) was a senior officer in the Royal Navy who served as Commander-in-Chief of the Western Fleet from 1970 to 1971.

== Naval career ==
Educated at the Royal Naval College Dartmouth, O'Brien was commissioned into the Royal Navy in 1930. He served in the Second World War, during which he served with the naval escort of the fateful PQ 17 convoy. He was promoted to captain on 30 June 1955.

In the early 1960s, O'Brien served as Director of Naval Plans at the Ministry of Defence under Lord Louis Mountbatten. He was then appointed Naval Secretary in 1964. He was appointed Flag Officer, Aircraft Carriers in 1966, Commander-in-Chief, Far East Fleet in 1967, and Commander-in-Chief of the Western Fleet in 1970. He retired in 1971.

== Later life ==
In retirement, O'Brien became Chairman of the King George's Fund for Sailors. In 1975 he was Chairman of the Royal Navy Club of 1765 & 1785 (United 1889). He became Chairman of the Kennet and Avon Canal and, after its re-opening by Queen Elizabeth II in 1990, he retired from this post. He also held the posts of Rear-Admiral and then Vice-Admiral of the United Kingdom. He died after a brief illness on 19 February 2016, aged 99.

== Family ==
In 1943, O'Brien married Rita Micallef: they went on to have one son and two daughters.

Military offices
Preceded by John Hayes	Naval Secretary; 1964–1966	Succeeded by Anthony Griffin
Preceded by Sir Frank Twiss	Commander-in-Chief, Far East Fleet; 1967–1969	Succeeded by Sir Derek Empson
Preceded by Sir John Bush	Commander-in-Chief Western Fleet; 1970–1971	Succeeded by Sir Edward Ashmore
Honorary titles
Preceded by Sir John Bush	Rear-Admiral of the United Kingdom; 1979–1984	Succeeded by Sir Derek Empson
Preceded by Sir John Bush	Vice-Admiral of the United Kingdom; 1984–1986	Succeeded by Sir Derek Empson
