= Edward Twiss =

English cricketer and military officer

Personal information
- Full name: Edward Kemble Twiss
- Born: 6 November 1882; Kingston, Surrey, England
- Died: 1 August 1943 (aged 60); Brighton, Sussex, England
- Batting: Unknown
- Bowling: Unknown

Domestic team information
- Years: Team
- 1901: Oxfordshire
- 1913/14: Europeans

Career statistics
Competition	First-class
Matches	2
Runs scored	6
Batting average	1.50
100s/50s	–/–
Top score	3
Balls bowled	228
Wickets	7
Bowling average	14.14
5 wickets in innings	1
10 wickets in match	–
Best bowling	6/30
Catches/stumpings	–/–
- Source: ESPNcricinfo, 25 June 2019

Lieutenant-Colonel Edward Kemble Twiss DSO (6 November 1882 – 1 August 1943) was an English first-class cricketer and an officer in both the British Army and the British Indian Army, as well as playing first-class cricket while serving in British India.

== Life and military career ==
Twiss was born at Surbiton Surrey, the son of Vice-Admiral Guy Ouchterlony Twiss R.N. and Margaret Louisa née Williams. He was educated at Magdalen College School, Oxford. He played minor counties cricket for Oxfordshire in 1901, making five appearances in the Minor Counties Championship. Deciding on a career as a professional soldier, Twiss enlisted with the Devonshire Regiment as a second lieutenant in July 1901. Shortly after enlisting he served in the Second Boer War. He was promoted to the rank of lieutenant in January 1904, before being transferred to the British Indian Army in October 1905, joining the 10th Jats. He was promoted to the rank of captain in July 1910. He made two appearances in first-class cricket for the Europeans against the Hindus and the Parsees in 1913–14 Bombay Presidency matches at Poona. Against the Hindus he took figures of 6 for 30.

He served in the First World War attached to the Dorset Regiment and was cited for the Distinguished Service Order in June 1916, with promotion to the rank of major coming in the following month. Following the war, Twiss returned to the British Indian Army, retiring from active service in March 1920, at which point he was granted the rank of lieutenant colonel. He died at Brighton in August 1943. His son, Frank Twiss, would become an admiral in the Royal Navy.
