= Vice-Admiral of the United Kingdom =

Honorary office in the United Kingdom

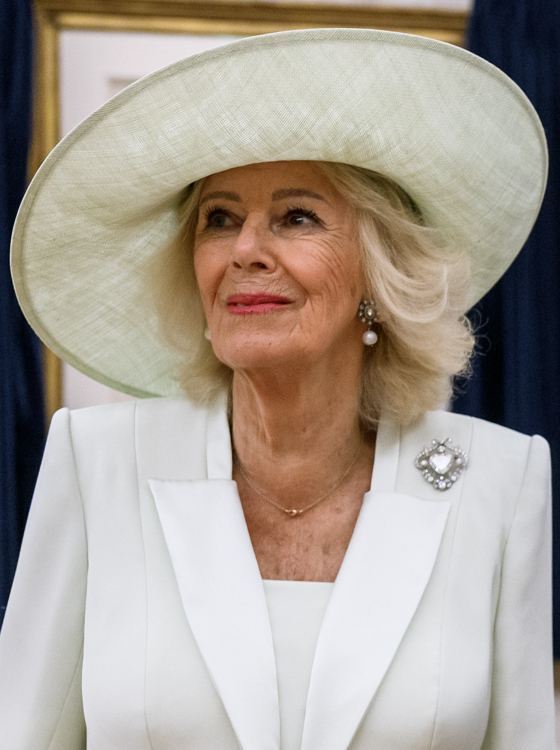
- Incumbent; Queen Camilla since 16 July 2025
- Appointer: Monarch
- Formation: 25 April 1513
- First holder: William FitzWilliam, 1st Earl of Southampton
- Deputy: Rear-Admiral of the United Kingdom

Vice-Admiral of the United Kingdom is an honorary office, which has generally held by a senior (and often retired) Royal Navy admiral. The title holder is the official deputy to the Lord High Admiral, an honorary (although once operational) office which is (as of 2025) vested in the Sovereign.

In former days, the Vice-Admiral of England (or Vice-Admiral of Great Britain following the 1707 union with Scotland) was the second most powerful position in the Royal Navy. The post was for many years held jointly with that of Lieutenant of the Admiralty.

Below the office of Vice-Admiral of the United Kingdom ranks the Rear-Admiral of the United Kingdom, another now honorary office.

== History ==
The office was originally created on 25 April 1513, by Tudor King Henry VIII. The office holder served as the deputy of the Lord High Admiral from April 1546. From 1557 to 1558 Vice-Admiral Sir John Clere of Ormesby was appointed Vice-Admiral of England by patent but not appointed Lieutenant of the Admiralty.

In 1727, following the accession of King George II, the Earl of Berkeley (who had served as "Vice-Admiral of Great Britain" in the previous reign) was reappointed to the office as "Vice-Admiral of Great Britain, and Lieutenant of the Admiralty thereof, and Lieutenant of the Navies and Seas of this Kingdom". The same wording was used for subsequent appointees during the 18th century, and similarly in the 19th ('Vice Admiral of the United Kingdom of Great Britain and Ireland, and Lieutenant of the Admiralty thereof, and also Lieutenant of the Navies and Seas of the said United Kingdom'). This usage pertained up to and including Sir Davidge Gould's appointment in 1846. His successor Sir Robert Stopford was appointed 'Vice-Admiral of the United Kingdom of Great Britain and Ireland, and Lieutenant of the Admiralty thereof'; this form of words continued to be used into the 21st century (albeit with appropriate modification after the partition of Ireland).

For many years the Vice-Admiral of the United Kingdom had received a salary (in addition to half-pay), but in 1870 this payment (by then amounting to £432 1s 9d per annum) was abolished by Order in Council.

The Vice-Admiral (or in his absence the Rear-Admiral) of the United Kingdom regularly took part in the State Procession at the State Opening of Parliament, up until 1998 (when representation of the armed forces in the procession was scaled back).

Up to and including the appointment of Sir Jeremy Black (2001–2005), the office was formally gazetted as 'Vice Admiral of the United Kingdom and Lieutenant of the Admiralty thereof'. Subsequently, the appointment of Vice-Admiral of the United Kingdom came to be joined with that of Commander-in-Chief Fleet, until that post was discontinued in 2012. Since then, the appointment has been gazetted simply as Vice Admiral of the United Kingdom.

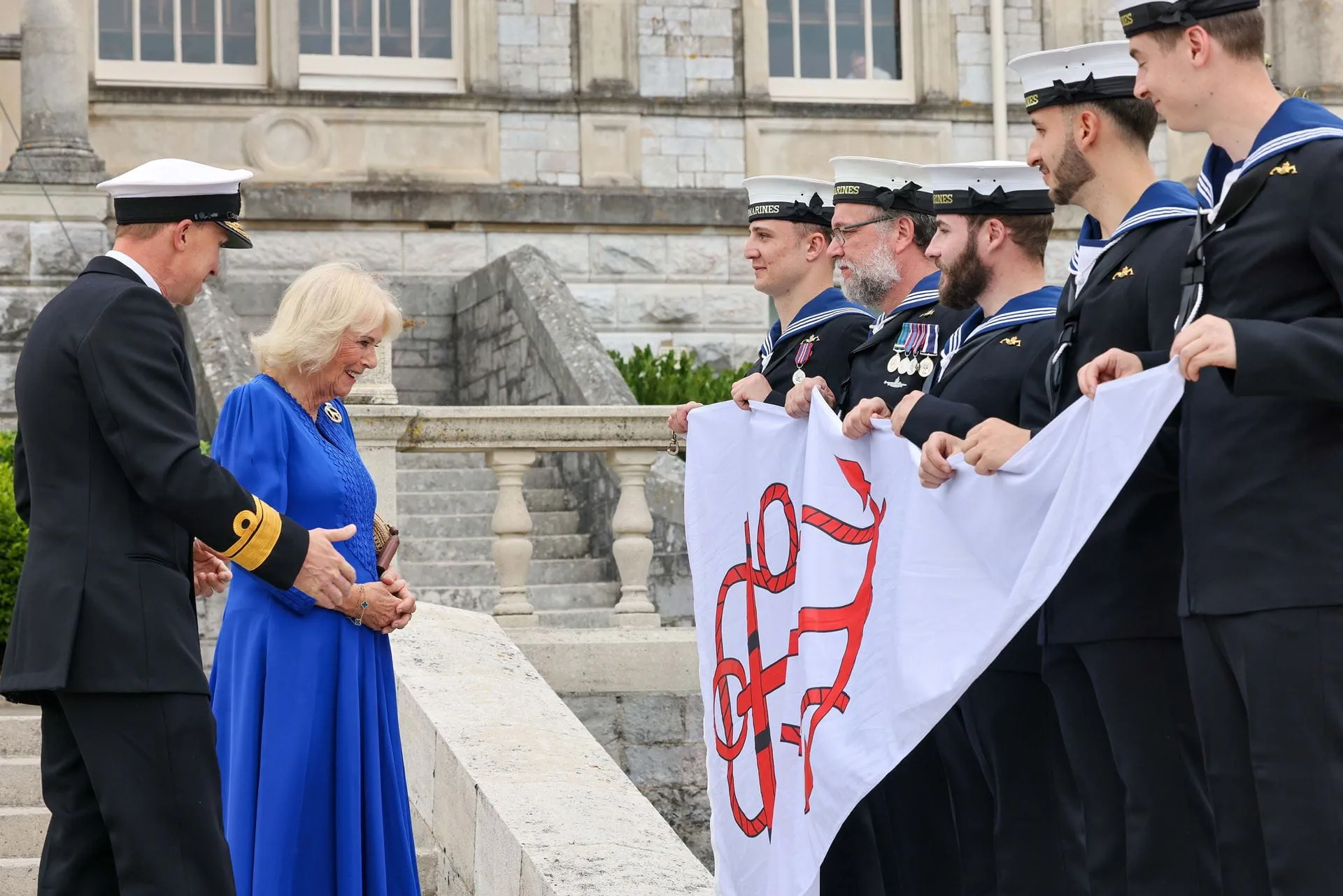
The Queen receives her burgee, 16 July 2025

In July 2025, Queen Camilla became the first female Vice Admiral of the United Kingdom.

== Vice-Admirals of England ==
- Vice-Admiral William FitzWilliam 25 April 1513 – 1536

Post in abeyance

- Vice-Admiral Sir Thomas Clere April 1546 – December 1552
- Vice-Admiral Sir William Woodhouse, December 1552 – 1557
- Vice-Admiral Sir John Clere of Ormesby 1557 – 1558

Post in abeyance

- Vice-Admiral Sir Richard Leveson April 1604 – July 1605

Post in abeyance

- Vice-Admiral Sir Robert Mansell 1618 – 1648

Post in abeyance

- Vice-Admiral Edward Montagu, 1st Earl of Sandwich 1 April 1661 – 28 May 1672
- Vice-Admiral Prince Rupert of the Rhine 15 August 1672 – 19 November 1682
- Vice-Admiral Henry FitzRoy, 1st Duke of Grafton 2 December 1682 – 1689
- Vice-Admiral Arthur Herbert, 1st Earl of Torrington 14 September 1689 – 18 December 1690
- vacant?
- Vice-Admiral Edward Russell, 1st Earl of Orford 9 November 1693 – ?
- Vice-Admiral Sir George Rooke 1702 – 1 May 1707

== Vice-Admirals of Great Britain ==
- Sir George Rooke 1 May 1707 – 24 January 1709?
- James Berkeley, 3rd Earl of Berkeley 18 March 1718 (N.S.) – 17 August 1736
- Sir John Norris April 1739 – 14 June 1749
- George Anson, 1st Baron Anson 4 July 1749 – 6 June 1762
- Henry Osborn 4 January 1763 – 1765
- Edward Hawke, 1st Baron Hawke 5 November 1765 – 16 October 1781
- George Brydges Rodney, 1st Baron Rodney 6 November 1781 – 24 May 1792
- Richard Howe, 1st Earl Howe 9 June 1792 – March 1796
- Alexander Hood, 1st Viscount Bridport March 1796 – 1801

== Vice-Admirals of the United Kingdom ==
- Alexander Hood, 1st Viscount Bridport 1 January 1801 – 2 May 1814
- Sir William Cornwallis 14 May 1814 – 5 July 1819
- Sir William Young 18 July 1819 – 25 October 1821
- James Saumarez, 1st Baron de Saumarez 21 November 1821 – 15 February 1832
- Edward Pellew, 1st Viscount Exmouth 15 February 1832 – 23 January 1833
- Sir Edward Thornbrough 30 January 1833 – 3 April 1834
- Sir George Martin April 1834 – 9 November 1846
- Sir Davidge Gould 17 November 1846 – 23 April 1847
- Sir Robert Stopford 5 May 1847 – 25 June 1847
- Sir George Martin 10 July 1847 – 28 July 1847
- Sir Thomas Byam Martin 10 August 1847 – 21 October 1854
- Sir William Hall Gage 6 November 1854 – 20 May 1862
- Sir Graham Hamond, 2nd Baronet 5 June 1862 – 10 November 1862
- Sir Francis Austen 11 December 1862 – 27 April 1863
- Thomas Cochrane, 10th Earl of Dundonald 16 May 1863 – 12 September 1865
- Sir George Seymour 23 September 1865 – 20 November 1866
- Sir William Bowles 26 November 1866 – 15 January 1869
- Sir George Sartorius 1 March 1869 – 3 July 1869
- Sir Fairfax Moresby 17 July 1869 – 21 January 1870
- Sir Provo Wallis 12 February 1870 – 15 January 1876
- Sir Michael Seymour 15 January 1876 – 23 February 1887

1876: Abolished under Queen Victoria

1901: Revived by King Edward VII

- Sir Michael Culme-Seymour, 3rd Baronet 25 July 1901 – 1920
- Sir Francis Bridgeman 1920 – 17 February 1929
- Sir Stanley Colville 25 March 1929 – 13 February 1939
- Sir Montague Browning 13 February 1939 – 19 June 1945
- Sir Martin Dunbar-Nasmith 19 June 1945 – 12 October 1962
- Sir John Edelsten 12 October 1962 – 11 March 1966
- Sir Peter Reid 11 March 1966 – 11 January 1973
- Sir Deric Holland-Martin 11 January 1973 – 12 April 1976
- Sir Nigel Henderson 12 April 1976 – 1 August 1979
- Sir John Bush 1 August 1979 – 1984
- Sir William O'Brien 1984 – 13 November 1986
- Sir Derek Empson 13 November 1986 – 29 October 1988
- Sir Anthony Griffin 29 October 1988 – 24 November 1988
- Sir Anthony Morton 24 November 1988 – 17 January 1994
- Sir James Eberle 17 January 1994 – 6 November 1997
- Sir Nicholas Hunt 6 November 1997 – 30 April 2001
- Sir Jeremy Black 30 April 2001 – 2005
- Sir James Burnell-Nugent 2005 – 2007
- Sir Mark Stanhope 2007 – 2009
- Sir Trevor Soar 2009 – 2012
- Sir George Zambellas January–April 2012
- Sir Donald Gosling 2 April 2012 – 16 September 2019
- Michael Boyce, Baron Boyce 6 December 2021 – 6 November 2022
- Queen Camilla 16 July 2025 – present
