= HMS Blackpool (F77) =

1958 Type 12 or Whitby-class frigate of the Royal Navy

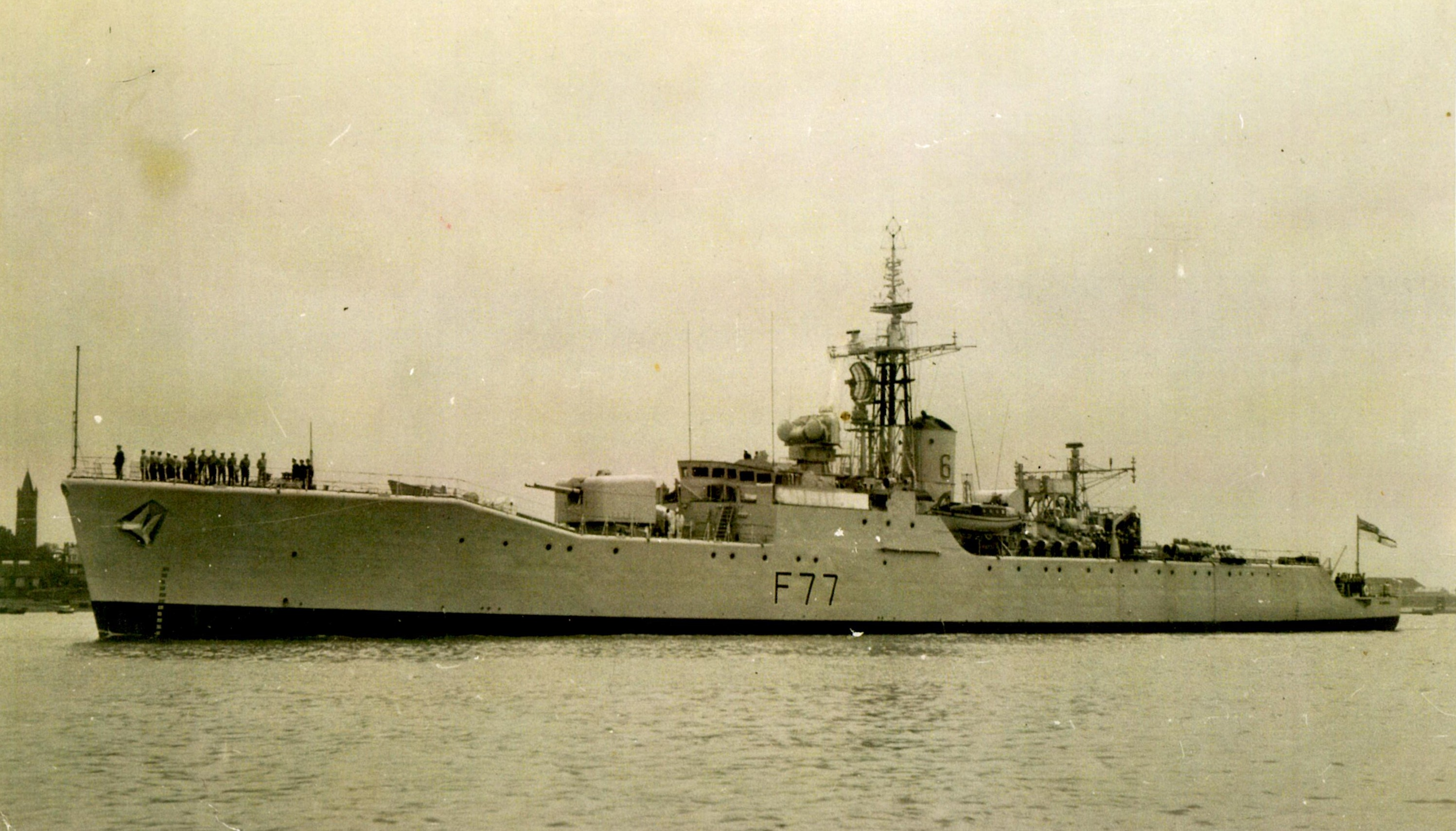
- HMS Blackpool

History

United Kingdom
- Name: HMS Blackpool
- Ordered: 6 March 1951
- Builder: Harland and Wolff, Belfast
- Laid down: 20 December 1954
- Launched: 14 February 1957
- Commissioned: 14 August 1958
- Out of service: Leased to the Royal New Zealand Navy between 7 June 1966– 30 June 1971
- Identification: Pennant number: F77
- Fate: Sold for scrapping in 1978

General characteristics
- Class & type: Whitby-class frigate
- Displacement: 2,150 tons (2,185 tonnes); 2,560 tons full load (2,600 tonnes)
- Length: 360 ft (109.7 m) w/l; 370 ft (112.8 m) o/a
- Beam: 41 ft (12.5 m)
- Draught: 17 ft (5.18 m)
- Propulsion: Y-100 plant; 2 Babcock & Wilcox boilers, 2 English Electric steam turbines, 2 shafts, 30,000 shp (22 MW)
- Speed: 30 kn (56 km/h)
- Range: 370 tons oil fuel, 4,200 nmi (7,780 km) at 12 knots (22 km/h)
- Complement: 152, later 225
- Sensors & processing systems: Radar Type 293Q target indication.; Radar Type 277Q height finding (later removed); Radar Type 275 fire control on director Mark 6M; Radar Type 262 fire control on STAAG; Radar Type 974 navigation; Type 1010 Cossor Mark 10 IFF; Sonar Type 174 search; Sonar Type 162 target classification; Sonar Type 170 attack
- Armament: 1 × twin 4.5 in (114 mm) gun Mark 6; 1 × twin 40 mm Bofors gun Mark 2 STAAG, later; 1 × single 40 mm Bofors gun Mark 7; 2 × Limbo A/S mortar Mark 10; 12 × 21 in A/S torpedo tubes (removed or never shipped)

HMS Blackpool was a Whitby-class or Type 12 anti-submarine frigate of the Royal Navy.

== Service history ==
Blackpool was leader of the 6th Frigate Squadron between 1958 and 1960 and was commanded by Edward Ashmore. Between 1962 and 1964 she was part of the 25th Escort squadron consisting of HMS Rothesay (Capt Place VC) (Capt D), HMS Cavendish, HMS Brighton, HMS Blackpool and HMS Llandaff (Canteen boat). Twelve months east of Suez, six months at home, and another six months in the Far East. Between 1964 and 1966 she was leader of the 28th Escort Squadron.

She was leased to the Royal New Zealand Navy between 7 June 1966 and 30 June 1971. In 1969, Blackpool was present at the Melbourne-Evans collision.

== See also ==
- Frigates of the Royal New Zealand Navy

== Sources ==
- Colledge, J. J.; Warlow, Ben (2006) [1969]. Ships of the Royal Navy: The Complete Record of All Fighting Ships of the Royal Navy from the 15th Century to the Present (3rd Rev ed.). London: Chatham Publishing. ISBN 978-1-86176-281-8. OCLC 67375475.
- Gerry Wright, The Story of HMNZS Blackpool (Wellington: Printshop, 2012).
