= Rear-Admiral of the United Kingdom =

Senior rank of the Royal Navy

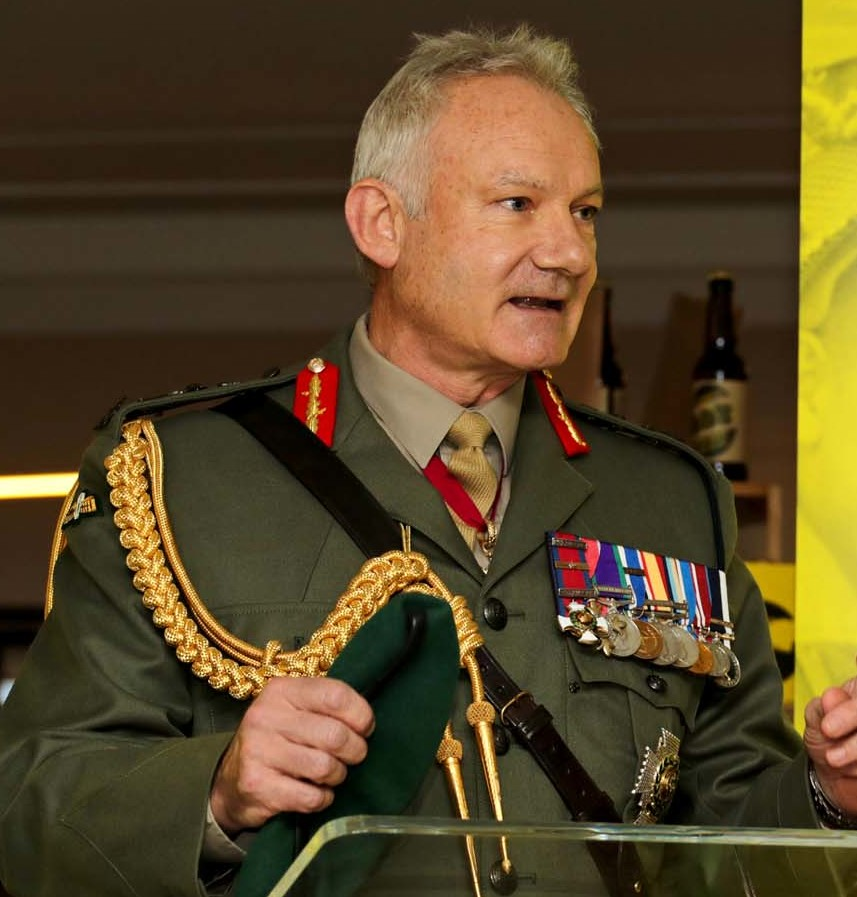
- Incumbent; General Sir Gordon Messenger since 6 December 2021
- Appointer: Monarch
- Formation: 1683
- First holder: Arthur Herbert, 1st Earl of Torrington

Rear-Admiral of the United Kingdom is a now honorary office generally held by a senior (usually retired) Royal Navy admiral, though the current incumbent is a retired Royal Marine General. Despite the title, the Rear-Admiral of the United Kingdom is usually a full admiral. He is the deputy to the Vice-Admiral of the United Kingdom, who is in turn deputy to the Lord High Admiral of the United Kingdom (an office that is currently vested in the Sovereign).

== History ==
The office dates from 1683, when the experienced naval officer Arthur Herbert was appointed Rear-Admiral of England in order to provide support to the inexperienced Duke of Grafton (who was a natural son of Charles II) in the role of Vice-Admiral of England, to which he had been appointed at the age of 19. In the 19th and 20th centuries it was not unusual for the Rear-Admiral of the United Kingdom to succeed to the office of Vice-Admiral of the United Kingdom. (Note: See office-holders with an asterisk below)

Until 1870 the Rear-Admiral of the United Kingdom received a salary (in addition to half-pay), but in February of that year his remuneration (by then amounting to £324 9s per annum) was abolished by Order in Council.

== Rear-Admirals of England ==
- Arthur Herbert, 1st Earl of Torrington 1683–1687*
- Sir Roger Strickland 12 December 1687 – 13 December 1688
- Sir Cloudesley Shovell 6 January 1705 N.S. – 1 May 1707

== Rear-Admirals of Great Britain ==
- Sir Cloudesley Shovell 1 May 1707 – 23 October 1707
- vacant
- Sir John Leake 24 May 1709 – 1 August 1714
- vacant
- Matthew Aylmer, 1st Baron Aylmer 18 March 1719 N.S. – 18 August 1720
- George Byng, 1st Viscount Torrington October 1720 – 17 January 1733
- Sir John Jennings 27 February 1733 N.S. – 1743
- Thomas Mathews 18 February 1743 – 1749
- Sir William Rowley 4 July 1749 – 1763
- Edward Hawke, 1st Baron Hawke 4 January 1763 – 5 November 1765*
- Sir Charles Knowles 5 November 1765 – October 1770
- Francis Holburne October 1770 – 14 July 1771
- George Brydges Rodney, 1st Baron Rodney 17 August 1771 – 6 November 1781*
- George Darby 6 November 1781 – 1790
- Alexander Hood, 1st Viscount Bridport 6 April 1790 – March 1796*
- Sir William Cornwallis March 1796 – 1 January 1801

== Rear-Admirals of the United Kingdom ==
- Sir William Cornwallis 1 January 1801 – 14 May 1814*
- Sir William Young 14 May 1814 – 18 July 1819*
- James Saumarez, 1st Baron de Saumarez 18 July 1819 – 21 November 1821*
- William Carnegie, 7th Earl of Northesk 21 November 1821 – 28 May 1831
- Sir Thomas Foley 14 June 1831 – 9 January 1833
- Sir George Martin 23 January 1833 – April 1834*
- Sir Robert Stopford April 1834 – 5 May 1847*
- Sir Thomas Byam Martin 5 May 1847 – 10 August 1847*
- Sir George Cockburn, 10th Baronet 10 August 1847 – 19 August 1853
- Sir William Hall Gage 24 October 1853 – 6 November 1854*
- Thomas Cochrane, 10th Earl of Dundonald, 1st Marquess do Maranhão 6 November 1854 – 31 October 1860*
- Sir Graham Hamond, 2nd Baronet 22 November 1860 – 5 June 1862*
- Sir Francis Austen 5 June 1862 – 11 December 1862*
- Sir William Parker, 1st Baronet 11 December 1862 – 16 May 1863
- Sir George Seymour 16 May 1863 – 23 September 1865*
- Sir William Bowles 23 September 1865 – 26 November 1866*
- Sir Phipps Hornby 26 November 1866 – 19 March 1867
- Sir Fairfax Moresby 20 April 1867 – 17 July 1869*
- Sir Provo Wallis 17 July 1869 – 12 February 1870*
- Sir William Hope-Johnstone 12 February 1870 – 11 July 1878
- Sir William Martin, 4th Baronet 19 September 1878 – 24 March 1895
- abolished under Queen Victoria; revived by King Edward VII
- Sir Edmund Fremantle 25 July 1901 – 31 December 1926
- Sir Stanley Colville 31 December 1926 – 22 March 1929*
- Sir Montague Browning 22 March 1929 – 13 February 1939*
- Sir Hubert Brand 13 February 1939 – 19 June 1945
- Sir Percy Noble 19 June 1945 – 25 July 1955
- Sir John Edelsten 10 October 1955 – 12 October 1962*
- Sir Peter Reid 12 October 1962 – 11 March 1966*
- Sir Alexander Bingley 11 March 1966 – 1972
- Sir Nigel Henderson 11 January 1973 – 12 April 1976*
- Sir John Bush 29 April 1976 – 1 August 1979*
- Sir Sir William O'Brien 1 August 1979 – 1984*
- Sir Derek Empson 1984 – 13 November 1986*
- Sir Anthony Griffin 13 November 1986 – 29 October 1988*
- Sir Anthony Morton 29 October 1988 – 24 November 1988*
- Sir James Eberle 24 November 1988 – 17 January 1994*
- Sir Nicholas Hunt 17 January 1994 – 6 November 1997*
- Sir Jeremy Black 6 November 1997 – 30 April 2001*
- Sir Kenneth Eaton 30 April 2001 – 2007
- Sir Gordon Messenger 6 December 2021 – present

Those marked with an asterisk went on to serve in the office of Vice-Admiral of England (or Great Britain or the United Kingdom).

== See also ==
- Lieutenant of the Admiralty
- Admiralty
