= Derek Empson =

Royal Navy Admiral (1918-1997)

Admiral Sir Derek Empson GBE KCB
- Born: 29 October 1918; Sleaford, England
- Died: 20 September 1997 (aged 78); Hampshire, England
- Military career
- Allegiance: United Kingdom
- Branch: Royal Navy
- Service years: 1940–1976
- Rank: Admiral
- Commands: Naval Home Command (1974–75); Far East Fleet (1969–71); Flag Officer, Aircraft Carriers (1967–68); Carrier Strike Group Two (1967–68); HMS Eagle (1963–65); HMS Falcon (1952–54); 767 Naval Air Squadron (1946–48)
- Conflicts: Second World War
- Awards: Knight Grand Cross of the Order of the British Empire; Knight Commander of the Order of the Bath

Admiral Sir Leslie Derek Empson, GBE, KCB (29 October 1918 – 20 September 1997) was a senior officer in the Royal Navy who served as Commander-in-Chief Naval Home Command from 1974 to 1975.

== Naval career ==
Educated at Eastbourne College, Empson joined the Royal Navy at HMS St Vincent as a pilot 1940. He served in the Fleet Air Arm during the Second World War.

Empson was appointed Naval Assistant to the First Sea Lord in 1957 and then became commanding officer of HMS Eagle in 1963. He went on to be Flag Officer, Aircraft Carriers in 1967 and then Assistant Chief of the Naval Staff (Operations and Air) in 1968. He was made Commander-in-Chief, Far East Fleet in 1969, was promoted to vice admiral on 21 April 1970, and became Second Sea Lord and Chief of Naval Personnel in 1971. After promotion to full admiral on 1 August 1972, he became Commander-in-Chief Naval Home Command and Flag Officer Portsmouth Area in 1974. He retired in 1975.

== Later life ==
In retirement, Empson worked as a consultant for EMI. He also held the posts of Rear-Admiral and then Vice-Admiral of the United Kingdom.

Military offices
Preceded by Sir William O'Brien	Commander-in-Chief, Far East Fleet; 1969–1971	Succeeded by Sir Anthony Troup
Preceded by Sir Andrew Lewis	Second Sea Lord; 1971–1974	Succeeded by Sir David Williams
Preceded by Sir Andrew Lewis	Commander-in-Chief Naval Home Command; 1974–1975	Succeeded by Sir Terence Lewin
Honorary titles
Preceded by Sir William O'Brien	Rear-Admiral of the United Kingdom; 1984–1986	Succeeded by Sir Anthony Griffin
Preceded by Sir William O'Brien	Vice-Admiral of the United Kingdom; 1986–1988	Succeeded by Sir Anthony Griffin
