= Peter Hill-Norton =

Royal Navy admiral (1915–2004)

Admiral of the Fleet The Right Honourable The Lord Hill-Norton GCB
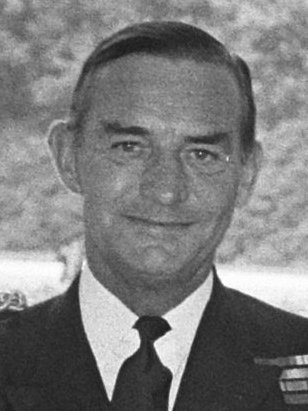
- Hill-Norton in 1974
- Born: 8 February 1915; Germiston, Transvaal Province, South Africa
- Died: 16 May 2004 (aged 89); Studland Bay, Dorset, England
- Military career
- Allegiance: United Kingdom
- Branch: Royal Navy
- Service years: 1929–1977
- Rank: Admiral of the Fleet
- Commands: Chief of the Defence Staff; First Sea Lord; HMS Ark Royal; HMS Decoy
- Conflicts: Second World War; Suez Crisis; Indonesia–Malaysia confrontation
- Awards: Knight Grand Cross of the Order of the Bath
- Other work

Member of the House of Lords
- Lord Temporal
- Life peerage 5 February 1979 – 16 May 2004

Personal details
- Party: Crossbencher

Admiral of the Fleet Peter John Hill-Norton, Baron Hill-Norton (8 February 1915 – 16 May 2004) was a senior Royal Navy officer. He fought in the Second World War as gunnery officer in a cruiser operating on the Western Approaches and in the North Sea, including the Norwegian Campaign. Subsequently he served on a cruiser covering the Arctic convoys and finally on a battleship in the Eastern Fleet. After the war he commanded a destroyer and then an aircraft carrier. Hill-Norton served as First Sea Lord and Chief of the Naval Staff and then Chief of the Defence Staff in early 1970s. In the latter role he gave the final commitment to Project Chevaline, the Polaris missile improvement programme. He went on to be Chairman of the NATO Military Committee.

== Naval career ==
Born the son of Captain Martin John Norton RFC and Margery Birnie Norton (née Hill), Peter John Norton (he changed his surname to Hill-Norton in 1931) was educated at the Royal Naval College, Dartmouth and the Royal Naval College, Greenwich. He joined the Royal Navy as a cadet in 1928 and, having been promoted to midshipman on 1 May 1932, was posted to the cruiser HMS London later that year. He transferred to the battleship HMS Rodney in September 1934 and, having been promoted to sub-lieutenant on 1 September 1935, he was posted to the battleship HMS Ramillies in August 1936. Promoted to lieutenant on 1 October 1936, he attended the gunnery course at the shore establishment HMS Excellent in 1939.

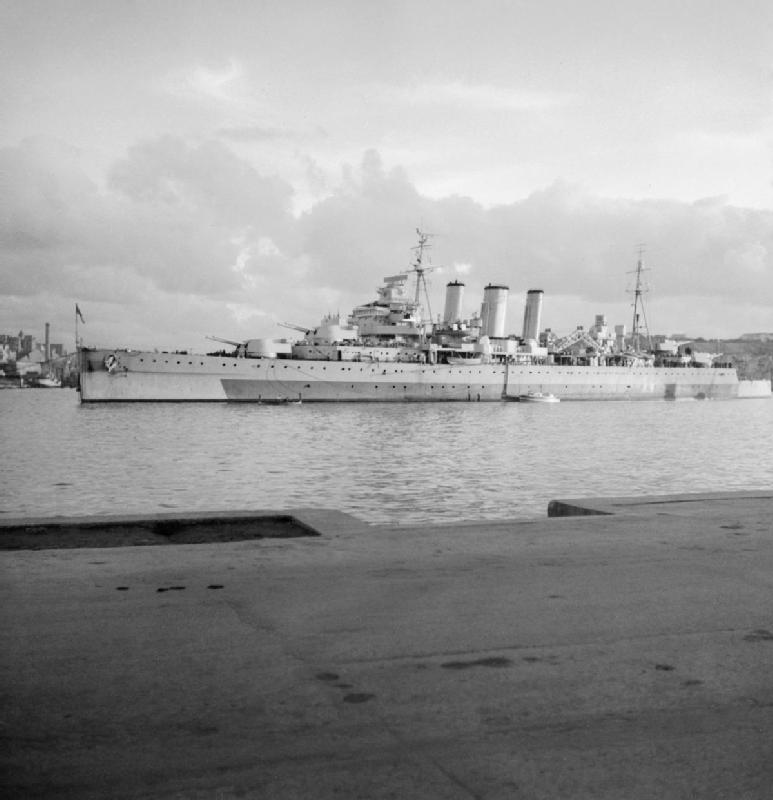
The cruiser HMS Cumberland in which Hill-Norton took part in the Arctic convoys during the Second World War

Hill-Norton served during the Second World War initially as a gunnery instructor at HMS Excellent and then as gunnery officer in the cruiser HMS Cairo operating on the Western Approaches and in the North Sea and taking part in the Norwegian Campaign in Spring 1940. He then transferred to the cruiser HMS Cumberland which took part in the Arctic convoys. He joined the staff of the gunnery division at the Admiralty in 1943 and, having been promoted to lieutenant commander on 1 April 1944, became gunnery officer in the battleship HMS Howe operating in the Eastern Fleet later that year. With HMS Howe he took part in the attack on the Sakishima Islands.

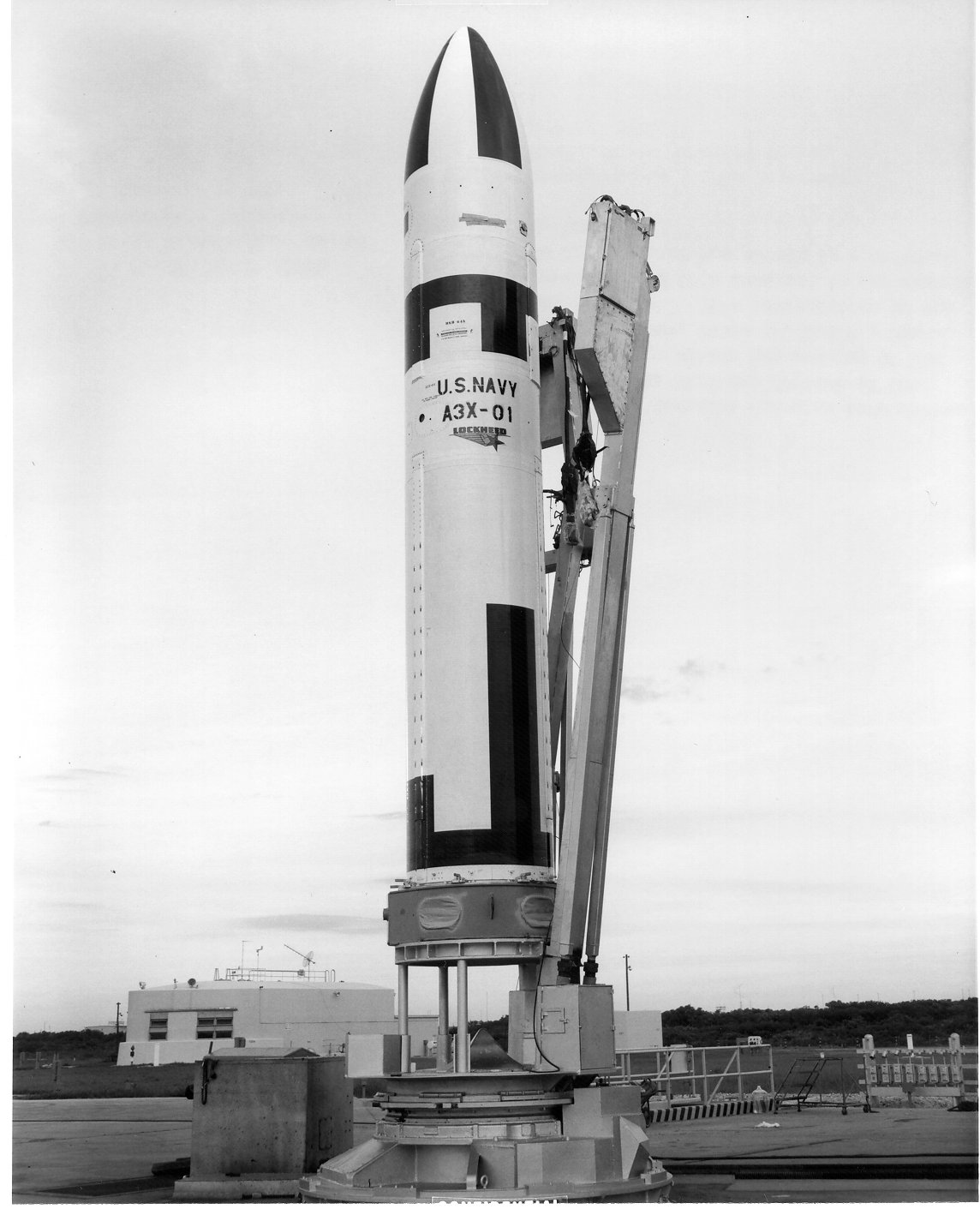
The Polaris missile improvement programme was approved by Hill-Norton as First Sea Lord

After the end of the War, Hill-Norton became gunnery officer in the cruiser HMS Nigeria in the South Atlantic and then, having been promoted to commander on 31 December 1947, he was posted to the naval ordnance division at the Admiralty. He became executive officer of the aircraft carrier HMS Eagle in 1951 and participated in Exercise Mainbrace. Promoted to captain on 31 December 1952, he was posted to Buenos Aires as naval attaché to Argentina, Paraguay and Uruguay in September 1953 before commanding the destroyer HMS Decoy during the Suez Crisis in 1956. He became Head of the Weapon Equipment Section at the Admiralty in 1957 and Director of the Tactical and Weapons Policy Division there in 1958. He was given command of the aircraft carrier HMS Ark Royal in October 1959, before being promoted to rear admiral on 8 January 1962 and being appointed Assistant Chief of Naval Staff in February 1962. He was appointed a Companion of the Order of the Bath in the 1964 New Year Honours. He was made Flag Officer Second in Command Far East Fleet in June 1964 during the Indonesia–Malaysia confrontation and, having been promoted to vice admiral on 7 August 1965, he became Deputy Chief of Defence Staff (Personnel and Logistics) at the Ministry of Defence in 1966. He was advanced to Knight Commander of the Order of the Bath in the 1967 New Year Honours. Becoming Second Sea Lord and Chief of Naval Personnel in January 1967, it was in this capacity that he took the decision to abolish the Royal Navy's traditional daily rum ration. He went on to be Vice Chief of the Naval Staff in August 1967 and, having been promoted to full admiral on 1 October 1968, he became Commander-in-Chief Far East Command in March 1969. He was advanced to Knight Grand Cross of the Order of the Bath in the 1970 Birthday Honours.

Hill-Norton was swiftly propelled into the post of First Sea Lord and Chief of the Naval Staff in July 1970 and then, having been promoted to Admiral of the Fleet on 12 March 1971, into the post of Chief of the Defence Staff in April 1971 following the unexpected early retirement of Sir Michael Le Fanu due to ill health. In the latter role he gave the final commitment to Project Chevaline, the Polaris missile improvement programme. He became Chairman of the NATO Military Committee in 1974, remaining in that post until his retirement in 1977.

== Later career ==
Hill-Norton was made a life peer as Baron Hill-Norton, of South Nutfield in the County of Surrey, in February 1979, and took an active role at the House of Lords as a crossbencher. He was President of the Sea Cadet Association, Chairman of the Royal Navy Club of 1765 & 1785 (United 1889), a Liveryman of the Shipwrights' Company and a Freeman of the City of London. He authored a book entitled No Soft Options: The Politico-Military Realities of NATO in 1978 and another entitled Sea Power: Story of Warships and Navies in 1982. He also narrated a series on sea power for BBC Television in 1985. In later years he took an interest in UFOs, writing about them and expressing concern in Parliament about the potential destruction of files on them.

Hill-Norton's interests included gardening and shooting. He lived at Hyde near Fordingbridge in Hampshire and died of a heart attack at Studland Bay in Dorset on 16 May 2004.

== Family ==
In 1936 he married Eileen Linstow; they had one son (Vice Admiral Sir Nicholas Hill-Norton) and one daughter.

== Arms ==
Coat of arms of Peter Hill-Norton

Crest
Out of a naval crown Or on a mount Vert a springbok trippant Proper.
Escutcheon
On a bend Gules between in chief a terrestrial sphere Proper and in base three cannon balls Sable within an annulet Azure four anchors Or.
Supporters
On either side a hippocampus holding in the tail an anchor Proper.
Motto
Try Harder

== Sources ==
- Heathcote, Tony (2002). The British Admirals of the Fleet 1734 – 1995. Pen & Sword Ltd. ISBN 0-85052-835-6.

Military offices
Preceded by Sir Desmond Dreyer	Second Sea Lord; 1967	Succeeded by Sir Frank Twiss
Preceded by Sir John Bush	Vice Chief of the Naval Staff; 1967–1969	Succeeded by Sir Edward Ashmore
Preceded by Sir Michael Carver	Commander-in-Chief Far East Command; 1969–1970	Succeeded by Sir Brian Burnett
Preceded by Sir Michael Le Fanu	First Sea Lord; 1970–1971	Succeeded by Sir Michael Pollock
Preceded by Sir Charles Elworthy	Chief of the Defence Staff; 1971–1973	Succeeded by Sir Michael Carver
Preceded by Johannes Steinhoff	Chairman of the NATO Military Committee; 1974–1977	Succeeded by Herman Zeiner Gunderson
