= HMS Corunna =

Battle-class destroyer

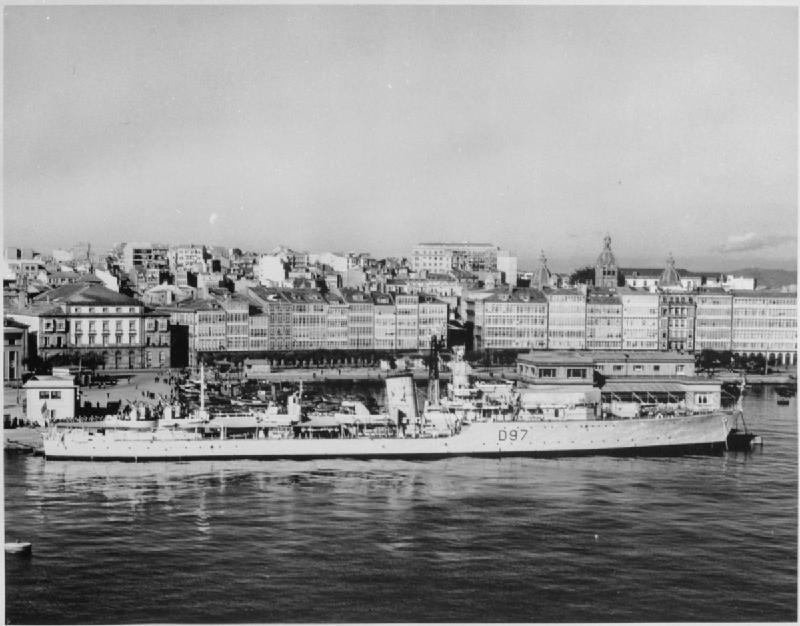

History

United Kingdom
- Name: HMS Corunna
- Ordered: 1943
- Builder: Swan Hunter, Tyne and Wear, United Kingdom
- Laid down: 12 April 1944
- Launched: 29 May 1945
- Commissioned: 6 June 1947
- Decommissioned: 1967
- Fate: Broken up 1975

General characteristics
- Class & type: Battle-class destroyer
- Displacement: 2,480 tons standard
- Length: 379 ft (116 m)
- Beam: 40 ft 6 in (12.34 m)
- Draught: 12 ft 8 in (3.86 m) mean; 17 ft 6 in (5.33 m) maximum
- Propulsion: Oil-fired, two three-drum boilers; Parsons geared turbines, twin screws, 50,000 hp (37,285 kW)
- Speed: 35.75 knots (66.21 km/h)
- Complement: 268
- Armament: Originally: 5 × 4.5 in (114 mm) guns; 8 × Bofors 40 mm guns; 10 × 21 in (533 mm) torpedo tubes; 2 × Squid mortar; Later: Sea Cat missiles

Service record
- Part of: 4th Destroyer Flotilla; 7th Destroyer Squadron; 21st Escort Squadron

HMS Corunna (D97) was a later or 1943 Battle-class fleet destroyer of the Royal Navy. She was named in honour of the Battle of Corunna, which took place during the Peninsular War in 1809 between British and French forces. Corunna was built by Swan Hunter & Wigham Richardson Limited on the Tyne. She was launched on 29 May 1945 and commissioned on 6 June 1947.

== Design and construction ==
The Battle-class was developed as a result of operational experience in the early years of the Second World War, which had shown that the Royal Navy's existing destroyers had inadequate anti-aircraft protection, and in particular, lacked a modern dual-purpose main gun armament, capable of dealing with both surface targets and air attack, with guns lacking the high elevation mountings necessary to deal with dive bombers. The resulting design was armed with two twin 4.5 inch high-angle gun-turrets of a new design mounted forward and a heavy close-in anti-aircraft armament, with 16 Battle-class destroyers ordered under the 1942 construction programme.

For the 1943 construction programme, 24 Battle-class destroyers of a revised design (known as "1943 Battles") were ordered, with three destroyers (Corunna, Oudenarde and River Plate) to be built by Swan Hunter.

Corunna was 379 ft 0 in (115.52 m) long overall, 364 ft 0 in (110.95 m) at the waterline and 355 ft 0 in (108.20 m) between perpendiculars, with a beam of 40 ft 6 in (12.34 m) and a draught of 12 ft 9 in (3.89 m) normal and 15 ft 6 in (4.72 m) at full load. Displacement was 2,550 long tons (2,590 t) standard and 3,420 long tons (3,470 t) full load. Two Admiralty 3-drum boilers supplied steam at 400 psi (2,800 kPa) and 700 °F (371 °C) to two sets of Parsons single-reduction geared steam turbines which drove two propeller shafts. The machinery was rated at 50,000 shp (37,000 kW), giving a speed of 34 kn (39 mph; 63 km/h) (31 kn (36 mph; 57 km/h) at full load. 766 long tons (778 t) of fuel oil was carried, giving an endurance of 4,400 nmi (5,100 mi; 8,100 km) at 20 kn (23 mph; 37 km/h).

Two twin 4.5 inch (113 mm) Mark IV gun mounts, capable of elevating to 85 degrees, were mounted forward, while a single 4.5 inch gun, elevating to 55 degrees was fitted behind the funnel - this fifth gun, which could fire astern, replaced a 4-inch gun fitted to the 1942 Battles used for firing Star shell and could be controlled by the main fire control system. Close-in anti-aircraft armament was eight Bofors 40 mm gun, with two twin stabilised STAAG mounts, with integrated fire control, aft, one simple Mark V twin mount amidships, and two single mounts on the bridge wings. Two quintuple 21 inch (533 mm) torpedo-tubes were fitted, with a Squid anti-submarine mortar aft.

Corunna, named after the 1809 Battle of Corunna, was one of thirteen 1943 Battles ordered on 23 April 1943. The destroyer was laid down at Swan Hunter's Tyneside shipyard on 12 April 1944, was launched on 29 May 1945. The end of the Second World War in August 1945 resulted in the decision to cancel 16 of the 1943 Battles, with construction of the remaining ships slowed. Corunna was commissioned on 23 May 1947, and was completed on 6 June 1947.

== Service ==
On commissioning, Corunna joined the 4th Destroyer Flotilla, part of the Home Fleet, but was temporarily laid up in reserve for several months from October 1947 owing to a manning crisis in the Royal Navy. On 8 December 1948 Corunna was in collision with the oiler Wave Sovereign while being refuelled, and was under repair at Chatham from 16 December to 18 February 1949. In 1953 she took part in the Fleet Review to celebrate the Coronation of Queen Elizabeth II. In 1954, Corunna, with the rest of the Squadron, formerly Flotilla, deployed to the Mediterranean, remaining there until 1955. Between 1955 and 1957 she was commanded by the future Admiral of the fleet T Lewin DSC. Corunna, with the rest of the Squadron, returned to the region in 1956 and took part in the Suez Crisis. On 15 March 1959, Corunna accidentally collided with her sister ship HMS Barrosa in the Bay Of Biscay.

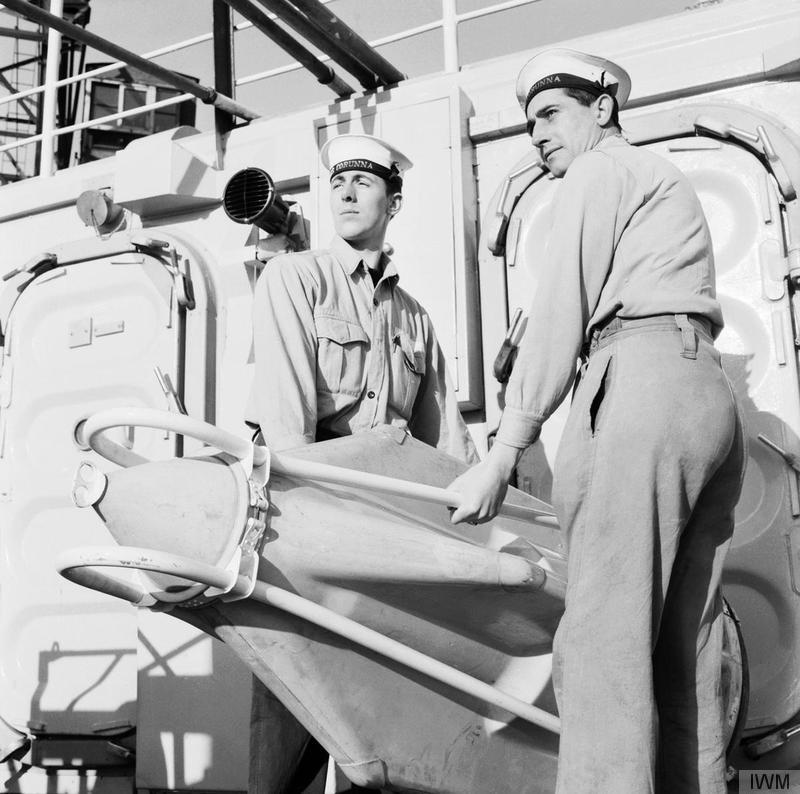
Handling a Sea Cat missile, HMS Corunna at Rosyth in 1962

Corunna subsequently began her conversion to a Radar Picket, of which three other ships were also converted. The conversion included new Anti-Aircraft weaponry, new radar, and the addition of the Sea Cat missile system. In 1962, Corunna joined the 7th Destroyer Squadron, based in the Mediterranean, and the following year joined the 21st Escort Squadron.

In 1964, Corunna deployed, along with the rest of the Squadron, to the Far East, where she would remain until 1965.

== Decommissioning and fate ==
In 1967, Corunna was placed in reserve and was put on the disposal list in 1972. On Friday 17 January 1975 "Corunna" was photographed alongside the partially demolished D86 HMS Agincourt at Sunderland. In 1975, Corunna arrived at Blyth in Northumberland where she was subsequently broken up.

== Publications ==
- Colledge, J. J.; Warlow, Ben (2006) [1969]. Ships of the Royal Navy: The Complete Record of All Fighting Ships of the Royal Navy from the 15th Century to the Present (3rd Rev ed.). London: Chatham Publishing. ISBN 978-1-86176-281-8. OCLC 67375475.
- Critchley, Mike (1982). British Warships Since 1945: Part 3: Destroyers. Liskeard, UK: Maritime Books. ISBN 0-9506323-9-2.
- English, John (2008). Obdurate to Daring: British Fleet Destroyers 1941–45. Windsor, UK: World Ship Society. ISBN 978-0-9560769-0-8.
- Friedman, Norman (2008). British Destroyers and Frigates: The Second World War and After. Barnsley, UK: Seaforth Publishing. ISBN 978-1-84832-015-4.
- Hodges, Peter (1971). Battle Class Destroyers. London: Almark Publishing. ISBN 0-85524-012-1.
- Lenton, H. T. (1970). Navies of the Second World War: British Fleet and Escort Destroyers: Volume Two. London: Macdonald & Co. (Publishers) Ltd. ISBN 0-356-03122-5.
- Manning, T. D.; Walker, C. F. (1959). British Warship Names. London: Putnam.
- Marriott, Leo (1989). Royal Navy Destroyers Since 1945. Shepperton, UK: Ian Allan. ISBN 0-7110-1817-0.
