= Fairfax Moresby =

Royal Navy officer (1786–1877)

Admiral of the Fleet Sir Fairfax Moresby GCB
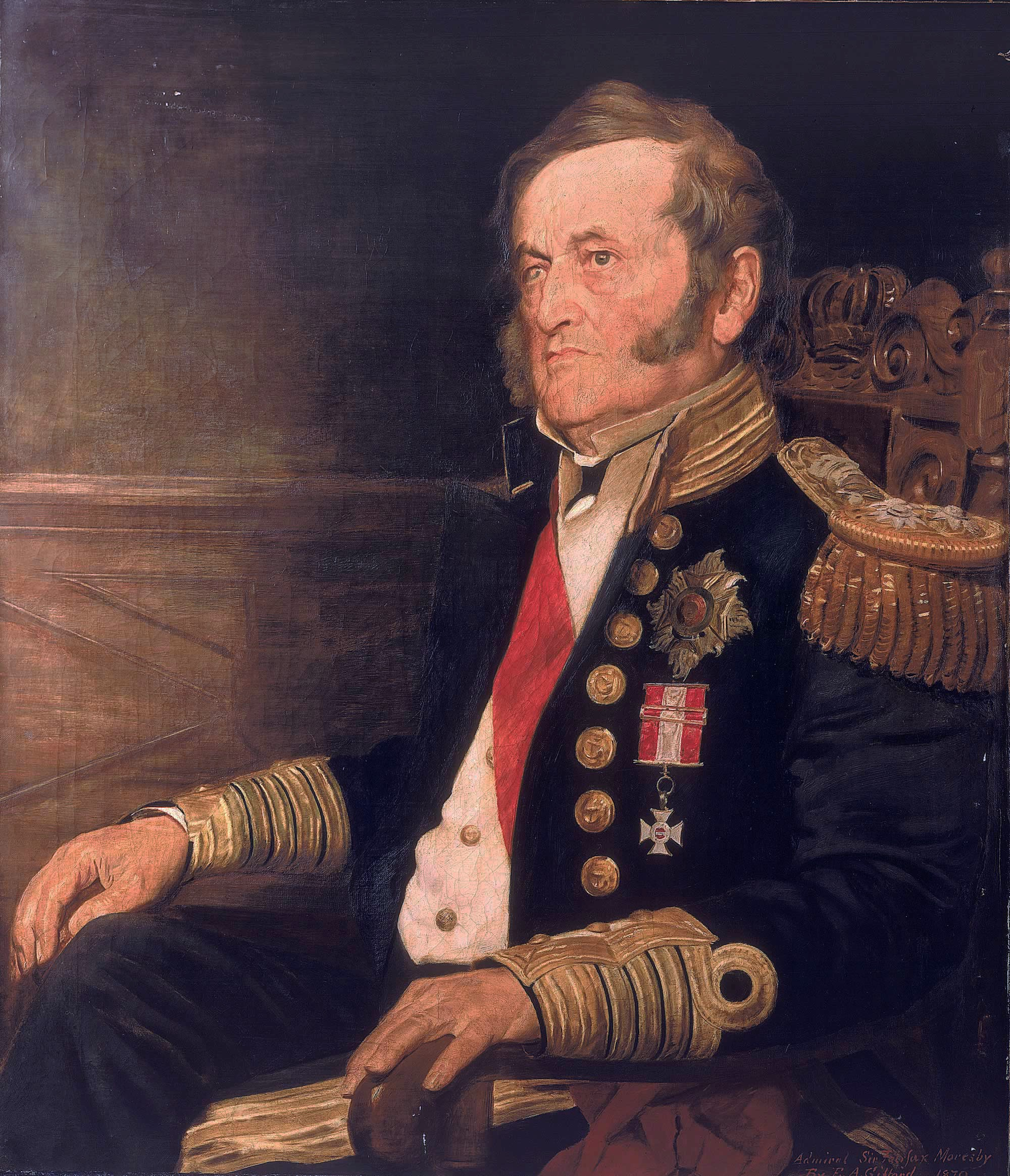
- 1870 portrait of Moresby
- Born: 29 November 1786; Calcutta, Bengal Presidency
- Died: 21 January 1877 (aged 90); Exmouth, Devon
- Burial place: St Margaret and St Andrew's Church, Littleham
- Relatives: Rear Admiral John Moresby (son), L. Adams Beck (granddaughter)
- Military career
- Allegiance: Great Britain; United Kingdom
- Branch: Royal Navy
- Service years: 1799–1870
- Rank: Admiral of the Fleet
- Commands: HMS Eclair; HMS Acorn; HMS Wizard; HMS Menai; HMS Pembroke; HMS Canopus; Pacific Station
- Conflicts: French Revolutionary Wars; Napoleonic Wars
- Awards: Knight Grand Cross of the Order of the Bath

Admiral of the Fleet Sir Fairfax Moresby (29 November 1786 – 21 January 1877) was a Royal Navy officer. As a junior officer he took part in the unsuccessful Ferrol Expedition during the French Revolutionary Wars. He later saw action during the blockade of Brest during the Napoleonic Wars before becoming commanding officer of a sloop which was sent to the Aegean Sea to defend the population of Malta from pirates; the grateful people presented him with a sword.

Moresby then sailed to the Adriatic Sea where he led a naval brigade providing artillery support to the Austrian forces during the siege of Trieste. He went on to be senior naval officer at the Cape of Good Hope and then senior officer at Mauritius, with orders to suppress the slave trade: he concluded the Moresby Treaty with Said bin Sultan, Sultan of Muscat and Oman, restricting the scope of local slave trading and conferring on British warships the right of searching and seizing local vessels.

Moresby later became Commander-in-Chief of the Pacific Station. His main responsibility was to protect British commercial interests in Valparaíso in the face of unrest among the people of Chile. He also took an interest in Pitcairn Islands at this time and planned the emigration of the islanders to Norfolk Island.

== Early career ==
Moresby was born on 29 November 1786 in Calcutta, part of the Bengal Presidency in British India, the son of Mary (née Rotton, 1767–1830) and Lieutenant Colonel (with 2nd Staffordshire Militia) Fairfax Moresby Sr (1753-1820) of Lichfield.

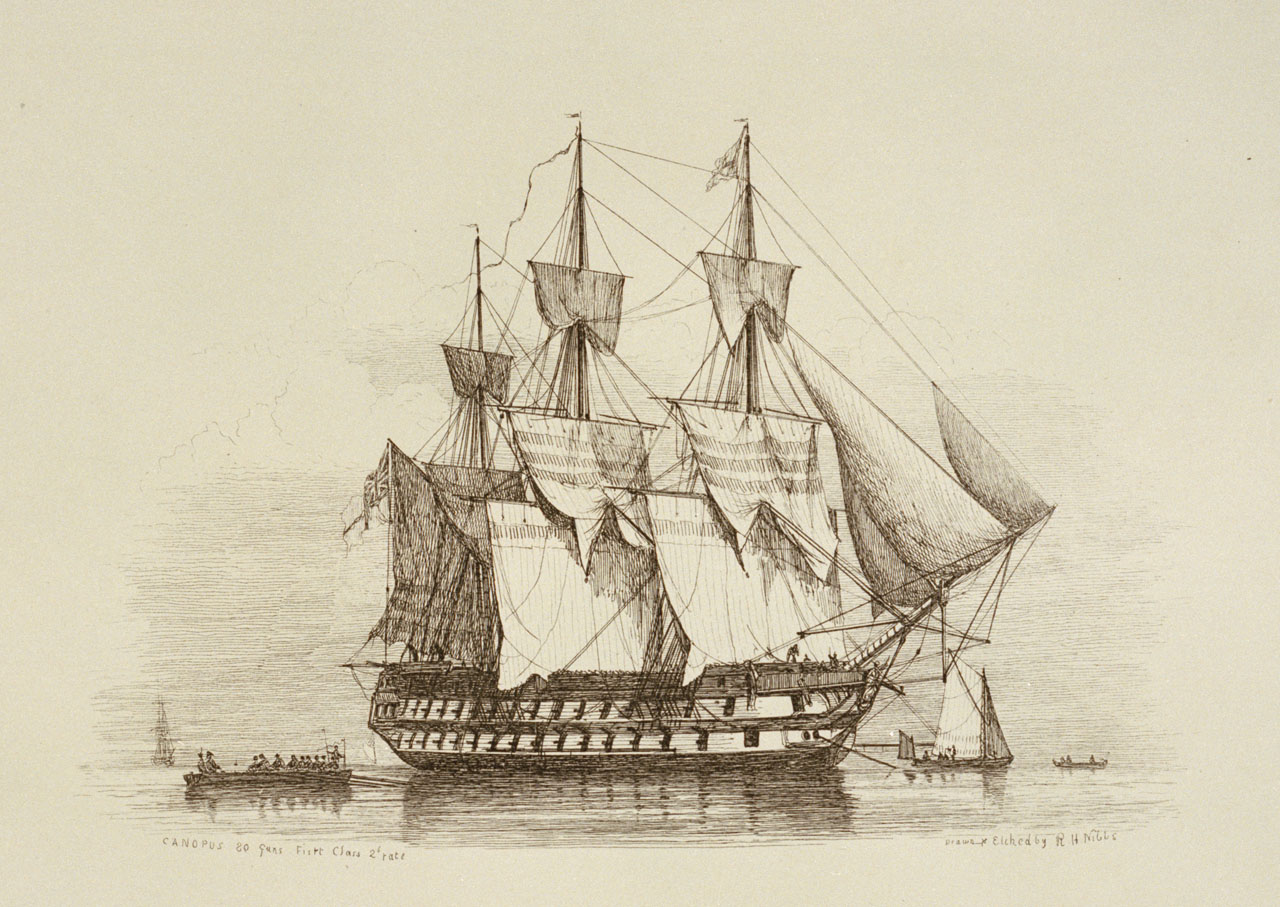
HMS Canopus, which Moresby commanded in the Channel Squadron

He joined the Royal Navy in December 1799. He was assigned to the second-rate HMS London as an able seaman but was promoted to midshipman and took part in the unsuccessful expedition to capture Ferrol in Spain in August 1800 during the French Revolutionary Wars. He transferred to the first-rate HMS Royal George later that year, to the sixth-rate HMS Alarm in the Channel Squadron in March 1802 and to the fifth-rate HMS Amazon in the Mediterranean Fleet in November 1802. In HMS Amazon he took part in the pursuit of the French Fleet, under the command of Admiral Pierre-Charles Villeneuve, to the West Indies and back in Summer 1805. He became a master's mate in the third-rate HMS Puissant at Portsmouth in December 1805 and then transferred to the first-rate HMS Hibernia, flagship of the Earl St Vincent, and saw action during the blockade of Brest during the Napoleonic Wars.

Promoted to lieutenant on 10 April 1806, Moresby was appointed to the first-rate HMS Ville de Paris and, after transferring to the third-rate HMS Kent in 1807, took part in the blockade of Rochefort. He subsequently transferred to the third-rate HMS Repulse in the Mediterranean Fleet and later to the third-rate HMS Sultan. He was then made acting commanding officer first of the sloop HMS Eclair and then of the sloop HMS Acorn observing French and Venetian ships in the Adriatic Sea in Spring 1811. Promoted to commander on 18 April 1811, he became commanding officer of the sloop HMS Wizard and was sent to the Aegean Sea to defend the population of Malta from pirates; the grateful people presented him with a sword. He then returned to the Adriatic Sea where he led a naval brigade providing artillery support to the Austrian forces during the siege of Trieste in October 1813. He was appointed a Knight of the Austrian Military Order of Maria Theresa on 23 May 1814 and, having been promoted to captain on 7 June 1814, was appointed a Companion of the Order of the Bath on 4 June 1815.

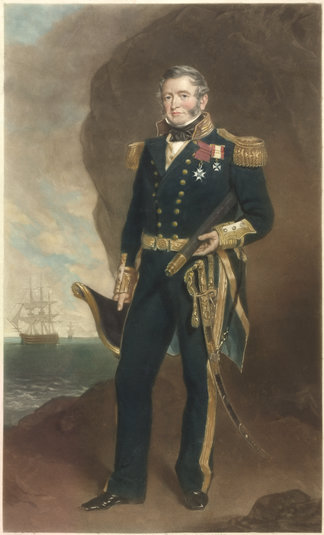
Sir Fairfax Moresby

Moresby became commanding officer of the sixth-rate HMS Menai in April 1819 and went on to be senior naval officer at the Cape of Good Hope early in 1820 and then senior officer at Mauritius in 1821, with orders to suppress the slave trade: he concluded the Moresby Treaty with Seyyid Said, the imam of Muscat in September 1822 restricting the scope of local slave trading and conferring on English warships the right of searching and seizing local vessels. In one action he boarded the schooner Camilla and freed 140 slaves. Moresby became commanding officer of the third-rate HMS Pembroke in the Mediterranean Fleet in January 1837 and commanding officer of the third-rate HMS Canopus in the Channel Squadron in March 1845.

== Senior command ==
Promoted to rear admiral 20 December 1849, Moresby became Commander-in-Chief of the Pacific Station, with his flag in the fourth-rate HMS Portland in August 1850. His main responsibility was to protect British commercial interests in Valparaíso in the face of unrest among the people of Chile. He also took an interest in Pitcairn Islands at this time and planned the emigration of the islanders to Norfolk Island which took place in 1856. Moreover, he proposed the establishment of the Esquimalt Naval Base on the West Coast of Canada, a recommendation which was taken up by the Admiralty in 1860.

Moresby was advanced to Knight Commander of the Order of the Bath on 5 July 1855, promoted to vice-admiral on 12 November 1856 and promoted to full admiral on 12 April 1862. He was advanced again to Knight Grand Cross of the Order of the Bath on 28 March 1865 and appointed Rear-Admiral of the United Kingdom on 20 April 1867 and then Vice-Admiral of the United Kingdom on 17 July 1869. He was promoted to Admiral of the Fleet on 21 January 1870.

Moresby died at his home near Exmouth in Devon on 21 January 1877 and was buried at St Margaret and St Andrew's Church, Littleham. After his death Port Moresby in Papua New Guinea and Fairfax Harbour on which it stands were named after him, as were the Moresby Islands in British Columbia.

== Family ==
Moresby's coat of arms

In August 1814, Moresby married in Malta with Eliza Louisa Williams, youngest daughter of John Williams of Bakewell, Derbyshire: they had two daughters: Ellen Mary (1820-) and Mary (1824-1908), and three sons: Commander Fairfax Moresby (1826–1858) who died in the wreck of the brig HMS Sappho off the coast of Victoria, Matthew Fortescue Moresby (1828-1918), a photographer in Australia, and Rear Admiral John Moresby (1830-1922) who surveyed the coast of New Guinea). A descendant was Admiral Sir Hugo Moresby White, Governor of Gibraltar from 1995 to 1997.

== See also ==
- O'Byrne, William Richard (1849). "Moresby, Fairfax" . A Naval Biographical Dictionary . John Murray – via Wikisource.
- Laughton, John Knox (1894). "Moresby, Fairfax" . In Lee, Sidney (ed.). Dictionary of National Biography. Vol. 39. London: Smith, Elder & Co.

== Sources ==
- Bosher, J.F. (2012). Imperial Vancouver Island: Who Was Who, 1850-1950. Berry Books. ISBN 978-0957375307.
- Campbell, Gwyn (2012). David Griffiths and the Missionary "History of Madagascar". Brill. ISBN 978-9004209800.
- Heathcote, Tony (2002). The British Admirals of the Fleet 1734 – 1995. Pen & Sword. ISBN 0-85052-835-6.

Military offices
Preceded by Sir Phipps Hornby	Commander-in-Chief, Pacific Station; 1850–1853	Succeeded by David Price
Honorary titles
Preceded by Sir Phipps Hornby	Rear-Admiral of the United Kingdom; 1867–1869	Succeeded by Sir Provo Wallis
Preceded by Sir George Sartorius	Vice-Admiral of the United Kingdom; 1869–1870	Succeeded by Sir Provo Wallis
