= L. Adams Beck =

British writer

Elizabeth Louisa Moresby Hodgkinson Adams Beck
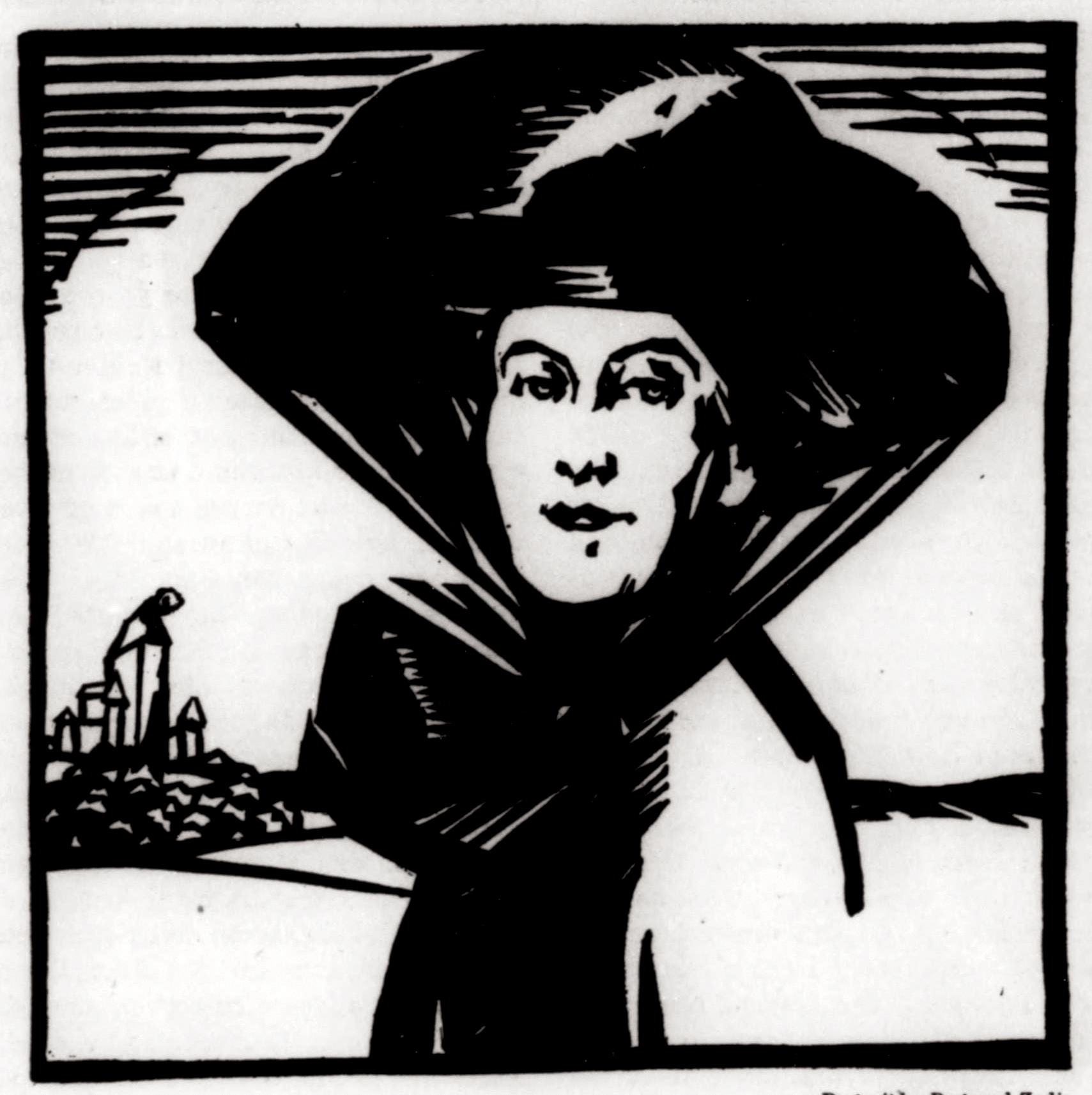
- Adams Beck in 1926
- Born: 1862; Queenstown, Cork, Ireland
- Died: 3 January 1931 (aged 68); Kyoto, Japan
- Occupations: writer, novelist
- Spouse(s): Edward Western Hodgkinson (18??–1910), Ralph Coker Adams Beck (1912–19??)
- Relatives: John Moresby (father), Fairfax Moresby (grandfather)
- Writing career
- Pen name: L. Adams Beck, E. Barrington, Louis Moresby
- Language: English language
- Period: 1919–1931

Lily Adams Beck, née Elizabeth Louisa Moresby (1862 in Queenstown, Cork, Ireland – 3 January 1931 in Kyoto, Japan) was a British writer of short stories, novels, biographies and esoteric books, under the names of L. Adams Beck, E. Barrington and Louis Moresby, and sometimes other variations: Lily Adams Beck, Elizabeth Louisa Beck, Eliza Louisa Moresby Beck and Lily Moresby Adams.

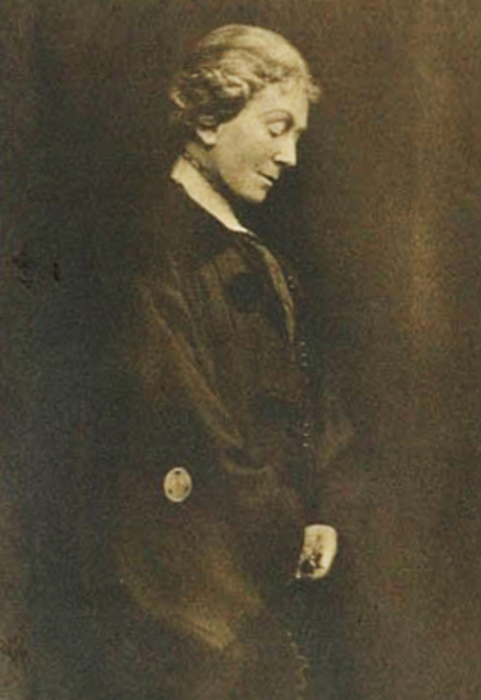
Lily Adams Beck (Elizabeth Louisa Moresby) c1926. This image is in the public domain.

== Biography ==
Portrait of Beck, c. 1910, by N. de Bertrand Lugrin Shaw

Elizabeth Louisa "Lily" Moresby was born in 1862 in Queenstown, Cork, Ireland, UK. (While there is a degree of uncertainty about her birth and early life, some sources suggest that Moresby was born in Queenstown, Ireland, then part of the United Kingdom.)

She was the second child of an Irish mother, Jane Willis (Scott), and an English father, John Moresby. Her father, a Royal Navy captain, explored the coast of New Guinea and was the first European to visit the site of Port Moresby. She was also the granddaughter of Fairfax Moresby, who culminated a long naval career as Admiral of the Fleet. She had an elder brother, Walter Halliday (9 November 1861 – 24 April 1951), and four younger sisters: Ethel Fortescue (1865 – ?), Georgina (23 July 1867 – ?), Hilda Fairfax (16 December 1868 – 16 August 1893) and Gladys Moresby (5 April 1870 – ?).

She first married Edward Western Hodgkinson, a commander in the Royal Navy. They lived and traveled widely in the East, including Egypt, India, China, Tibet, and Japan. Hodgkinson died around 1910.

In 1912, she married her second husband, retired solicitor Ralph Coker Adams Beck. Around 1919, the couple moved to Victoria, British Columbia, Canada, where she joined the Canadian Authors Association. She became the first prolific female fantasy novelist in Canada.

She began her writing career with short stories in periodicals such as The Atlantic Monthly, Asia, and the Japanese Gassho. Her first collection of short fiction was published in 1922. She was 60 years old by the time she started publishing her novels, which commonly had an Asian setting. Her stories collected in The Openers of the Gate (1930) feature an occult detective inspired by the "John Silence" stories of Algernon Blackwood. According to the historian Charles Lillard, she was also a distinguished writer of esoteric works such as The Splendor of Asia (1926) and The Story of Oriental Philosophy (1928). She has been noted as a major writer of Theosophy.

Under the pseudonym E. Barrington, she also published novelized biographies of British historical figures. The 1929 film The Divine Lady was based on her 1924 biographical novel about Emma, Lady Hamilton. Glorious Apollo (1925), a fictionalized biography of Lord Byron, was a bestseller during the 1920s. The Thunderer is a historical novel revolving around the relationship between Napoleon and Joséphine.

She continued to write and travel until her death on 3 January 1931 in Kyoto, Japan. She was 68.

== Works ==
=== L. Adams Beck ===
- The Ninth Vibration and Other Stories (1922)
  - Contents: The Ninth Vibration; The Interpreter: A Romance of the East; The Incomparable Lady; The Hatred of the Queen; Fire of Beauty; The Building of the Taj Mahal, How Great is the Glory of Kwannon!; The Round-Faced Beauty.
- The Key of Dreams: A Romance of the Orient (1922)
- The Perfume of the Rainbow and Other Stories (1923)
  - Contents: The Perfume of the Rainbow.; The Man and the Lesser Gods; Juana; The Courtesan of Vaisali; The Emperator and the Silk Goddess; The Loveliest Lady of China; The Ghost Plays of Japan; The Marvels of Xanadu; From the Ape to the Buddha; The Sorrow of the Queen; The Perfect One, The Way of Attainment; The Day Book of a Court Lady of Old Japan; The Courtesan Princess; The Happy Solitudes; The Desolate City.
- The Treasure of Ho: A Romance of Revelation (1924)
- The Way of the Stars: A Romance of Reincarnation (1925)
- Rubies: An Adventure in Burma (1925)
- Dreams and Delights: Fantasy Stories (1926)
- The Splendour of Asia: The Story and Teaching of the Buddha (1926) (also titled: The Life of the Buddha)
- The House of Fulfilment: The Spiritual Romance of a Soul in the Himalayas (1927)
- The Story of Oriental Philosophy (1928)
- The Way of Power: Studies in the Occult (1928) (also titled: Siddhis, Miracles, & Occult Power)
- The Garden of Vision: A Story of Growth (1929)
- The Openers of The Gate and Other Stories of the Occult (1930)
  - Contents: The Openers of the Gate; Lord Killary; How Felicity Came Home; Waste Manor; The Mystery of Iniquity; Many Waters Cannot Quench Love; The Horoscope; The Thug; Hell; The Man Who Saw.
- The Joyous Story of Astrid (1931)
- Dream Tea: Fantasy Stories (1934)
- A Beginner's Book of Yoga: A Compilation From Her Writings (1937) (edited by D. M. Bramble)

=== E. Barrington ===
- The Ladies: A Shining Constellation of Wit and Beauty (1922)
  - Contents: The Diurnal of Mrs. Elizabeth Pepys; The Mystery of Stella; My Lady Mary; The Golden Vanity; The Walpole Beauty; A Bluestocking at Court; The Darcys of Rosing.
- The Chaste Diana: The Romance Of The First Polly Peachum (1923)
- The Gallants: Following According to Their Wont the Ladies! (1924)
  - Contents: The King and the Lady; Her Majesty's Godson; The Prince's Pawns; The Pious Coquette; The Two and Nelson; The King and the Lady; The Wooing of Sir Peter Teazle.
- The Divine Lady: A Romance of Nelson and Emma Hamilton (1924)
- Glorious Apollo: A Novel of Lord Byron (1925)
- The Exquisite Perdita: A Novel of Mary Darby Robinson (1926)
- The Thunderer: A Romance of Napoleon and Joséphine (1927)
- The Empress of Hearts: A Romance of Marie Antoinette (1928)
- The Laughing Queen: A Romance of Cleopatra (1929)
- The Duel of the Queens: A Romance of Mary, Queen of Scotland (1930)
- The Irish Beauties: A Romance of the Luck of the Gunnings (1931)
- Anne Boleyn (1932)
- The Great Romantic: Being an Interpretation of Mr. Samuel Pepys and Elizabeth, His Wife (1933)
- The Graces (1934)
- The Wooing of the Queens: Philippa, Adelais, Matilda, Elizabeth, Isabella, and Anne of Cleves (1934)
- The Crowned Lovers: The True Romance of Charles the First and His Queen (1935)

=== Louis Moresby ===
- The Glory of Egypt (1926)
- Captain Java (1928)
