= HMS Illustrious (87) =

1940 Illustrious-class aircraft carrier of the Royal Navy

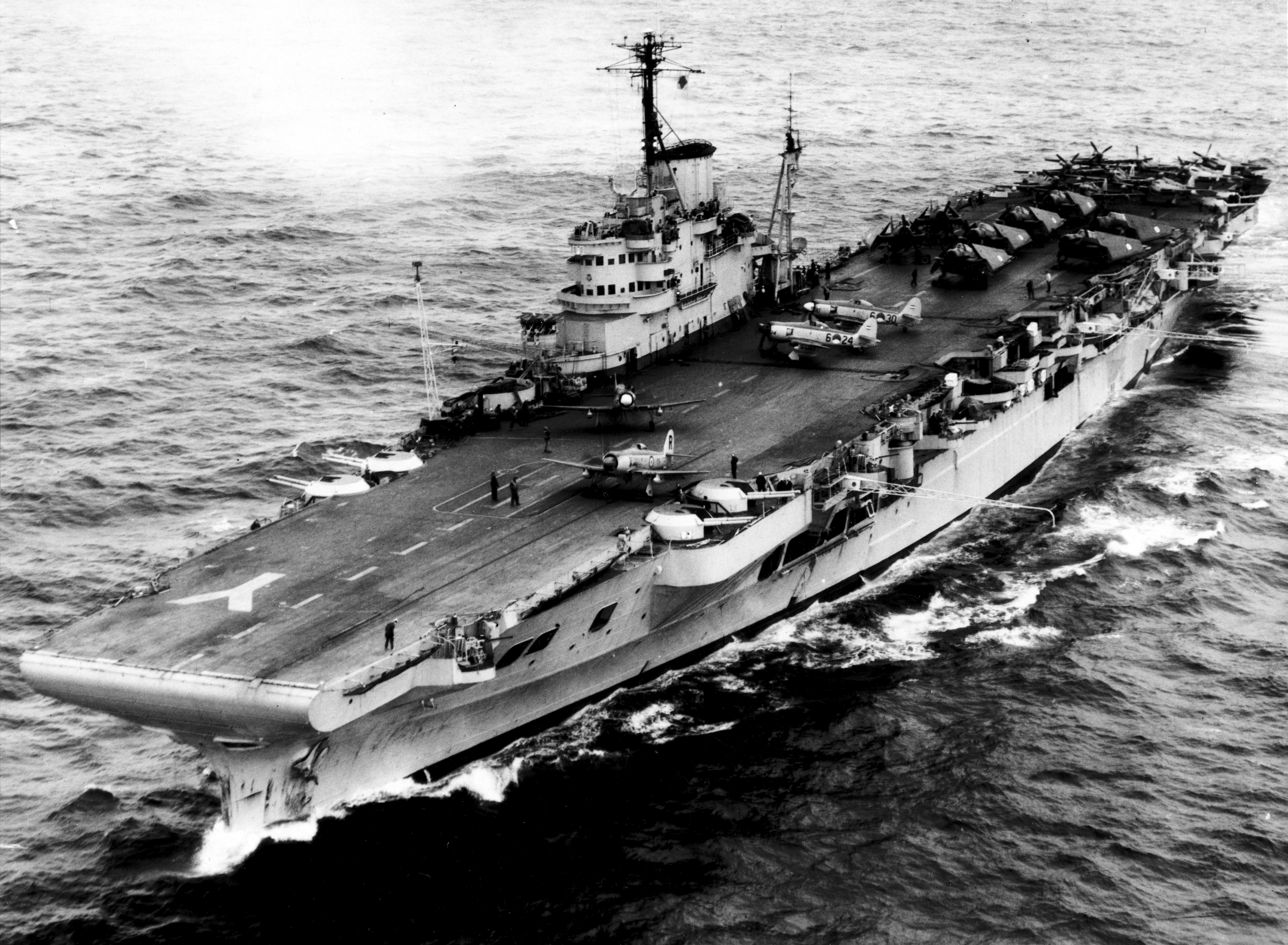
- Illustrious circa 1954

History

United Kingdom
- Name: Illustrious
- Ordered: 13 April 1937
- Builder: Vickers-Armstrongs
- Laid down: 27 April 1937
- Launched: 5 April 1939
- Commissioned: 25 May 1940
- Decommissioned: February 1955
- Identification: Pennant number: 87
- Motto: Vox non Incerta; (Latin: "No Uncertain Voice")
- Honours and awards: Genoa 1795; Basque Roads 1809; Java 1811; Taranto 1940; Mediterranean 1940–1942; Malta Convoys 1940; Diego Suarez 1942; Salerno 1943; Sabang 1944; Palembang 1945; Okinawa 1945
- Fate: Sold for scrap, November 1956
- Badge: In front of a trumpet erect two trumpets in saltire gold

General characteristics (as built)
- Class & type: Illustrious-class aircraft carrier
- Displacement: 23,000 long tons (23,369 t) (standard)
- Length: 740 ft (225.6 m) (o/a); 710 ft (216.4 m) (waterline)
- Beam: 95 ft 9 in (29.2 m)
- Draught: 28 ft 10 in (8.8 m) (deep load)
- Installed power: 111,000 shp (83,000 kW); 6 Admiralty 3-drum boilers
- Propulsion: 3 shafts; 3 geared steam turbines
- Speed: 30 knots (56 km/h; 35 mph)
- Range: 10,700 nmi (19,800 km; 12,300 mi) at 10 knots (19 km/h; 12 mph)
- Complement: 1,299
- Sensors & processing systems: 1 × Type 79 early-warning radar
- Armament: 8 × twin 4.5 in (114 mm) dual-purpose guns; 6 × octuple 2-pdr (40 mm) AA guns
- Armour: Waterline belt: 4.5 in (114 mm); Flight deck: 3 in (76 mm); Hangar sides and ends: 4.5 in (114 mm)
- Aircraft carried: 36
- Aviation facilities: 1 catapult

HMS Illustrious was the lead ship of her class of aircraft carriers built for the Royal Navy before World War II. Her first assignment after completion and working up was with the Mediterranean Fleet, in which her aircraft's most notable achievement was sinking one Italian battleship and badly damaging two others during the Battle of Taranto in late 1940. In January 1941, during Operation Excess, Illustrious was hit multiple times by German and Italian dive bombers and was repaired in the United States. After sustaining damage on the voyage home in late 1941 by a collision with her sister ship Formidable, Illustrious was sent to the Indian Ocean in early 1942 to support the invasion of Vichy French Madagascar (Operation Ironclad).

After returning home in early 1943, the ship was given a lengthy refit and briefly assigned to the Home Fleet. She was transferred to Force H for the Battle of Salerno in mid-1943 and then rejoined the Eastern Fleet in the Indian Ocean at the beginning of 1944. Her aircraft attacked several targets in the Japanese-occupied Dutch East Indies over the following year before Illustrious was transferred to the newly formed British Pacific Fleet (BPF). The carrier participated in the early stages of the Battle of Okinawa until mechanical defects arising from accumulated battle damage became so severe she was ordered home early for repairs in May 1945.

The war ended while she was in the dockyard and the Admiralty decided to modify her for use as the Home Fleet's trials and training carrier. In this role she conducted the deck-landing trials for most of the British post-war naval aircraft in the early 1950s. She was occasionally used to ferry troops and aircraft to and from foreign deployments as well as participating in exercises. In 1951, she helped to transport troops to quell rioting in Cyprus after the collapse of the Anglo-Egyptian treaty of 1936. She was paid off in early 1955 and sold for scrap in late 1956.

== Background and description ==
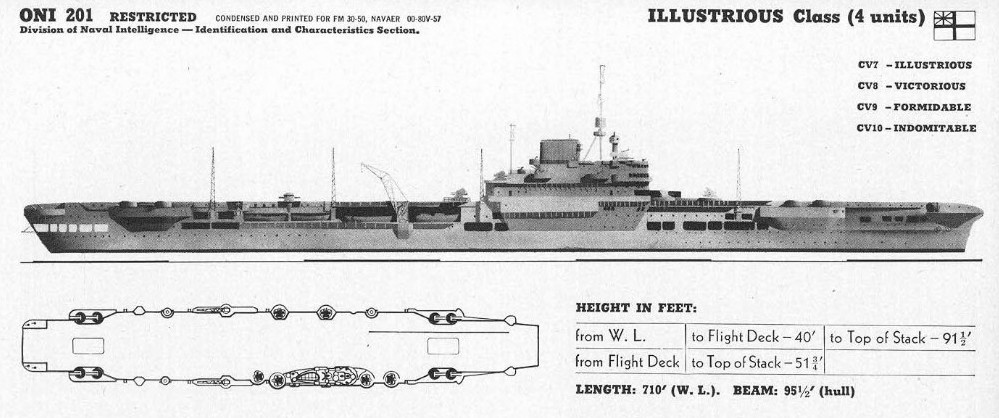
US Office of Naval Intelligence recognition drawing of the Illustrious-class carriers

The Royal Navy's 1936 Naval Programme authorised the construction of two aircraft carriers. Admiral Sir Reginald Henderson, Third Sea Lord and Controller of the Navy, was determined not to simply modify the previous unarmoured Ark Royal design. He believed that carriers could not be successfully defended by their own aircraft without some form of early-warning system. Lacking that, there was nothing to prevent land-based aircraft from attacking them, especially in confined waters like the North Sea and Mediterranean. This meant that the ship had to be capable of remaining in action after sustaining damage and that her fragile aircraft had to be protected entirely from damage. The only way to do this was to completely armour the hangar in which the aircraft would shelter, but putting so much weight high in the ship allowed only a single-storey hangar due to stability concerns. This halved the aircraft capacity compared with the older unarmoured carriers, exchanging offensive potential for defensive survivability.

Illustrious was 740 feet (225.6 m) in length overall and 710 feet (216.4 m) at the waterline. Her beam was 95 feet 9 inches (29.2 m) at the waterline and she had a draught of 28 feet 10 inches (8.8 m) at deep load. She displaced 23,000 long tons (23,369 t) at standard load as completed. Her complement was approximately 1,299 officers and enlisted men upon completion in 1940. By 1944, she was severely overcrowded with a total crew of 1,997. After post-war modifications to convert her into a trials carrier, her complement was reduced to 1,090 officers and enlisted men.

The ship had three Parsons geared steam turbines, each driving one shaft, using steam supplied by six Admiralty 3-drum boilers. The turbines were designed to produce a total of 111,000 shp (83,000 kW), enough to give a maximum speed of 30 knots (56 km/h; 35 mph) at deep load. On 24 May 1940 Illustrious ran her sea trials and her engines reached 113,700 shp (84,800 kW). Her exact speeds were not recorded as she had her paravanes streamed, but it was estimated that she could have made about 31 knots (57 km/h; 36 mph) under full power. She carried a maximum of 4,850 long tons (4,930 t) of fuel oil which gave her a range of 10,700 nautical miles (19,800 km; 12,300 mi) at 10 knots (19 km/h; 12 mph) or 10,400 nmi (19,300 km; 12,000 mi) at 16 knots (30 km/h; 18 mph) or 6,300 nmi (11,700 km; 7,200 mi) at 25 knots (46 km/h; 29 mph).

The 753-foot (229.5 m) armoured flight deck had a usable length of 620 feet (189.0 m), due to prominent "round-downs" (Note: "Round downs" were places at the ends of the flight deck that were faired into the hull; they were generally not usable by aircraft or equipment because they were not level.) at each end designed to reduce the effects of air turbulence caused by the carrier's structure on aircraft taking-off and landing, and a maximum width of 95 feet (29.0 m). A single hydraulic aircraft catapult was fitted on the forward part of the flight deck. The ship was equipped with two unarmoured lifts on the centreline, each of which measured 45 by 22 feet (13.7 by 6.7 m). The hangar was 456 feet (139.0 m) long and had a maximum width of 62 feet (18.9 m). It had a height of 16 feet (4.9 m) which allowed storage of Lend-Lease Vought F4U Corsair fighters once their wingtips were clipped. The hangar was designed to accommodate 36 aircraft, for which 50,650 imperial gallons (230,300 L; 60,830 US gal) of aviation spirit was provided.

=== Armament, electronics and protection ===
The main armament of the Illustrious class consisted of sixteen quick-firing (QF) 4.5-inch (110 mm) dual-purpose guns in eight twin-gun turrets, four in sponsons on each side of the hull. The roofs of the gun turrets protruded above the level of the flight deck to allow them to fire across the deck at high elevations. Her light antiaircraft defences included six octuple mounts for QF 2-pounder ("pom-pom") antiaircraft guns, two each fore and aft of her island, and two in sponsons on the port side of the hull.

The completion of Illustrious was delayed two months to fit her with a Type 79Z early-warning radar; she was the first aircraft carrier in the world to be fitted with radar before completion. This version of the radar had separate transmitting and receiving antennas which required a new mainmast to be added to the aft end of the island to mount the transmitter.

The Illustrious-class ships had a flight deck protected by 3 inches (76 mm) of armour and the internal sides and ends of the hangars were 4.5 inches (114 mm) thick. The hangar deck itself was 2.5 inches (64 mm) thick and extended the full width of the ship to meet the top of the 4.5-inch waterline armour belt. The underwater defence system was a layered system of liquid- and air-filled compartments backed by a 1.5-inch (38 mm) splinter bulkhead.

=== Wartime modifications ===
While under repair in 1941, Illustrious's rear "round-down" was flattened to increase the usable length of the flight deck to 670 feet (204.2 m). This increased her aircraft complement to 47 aircraft by use of a permanent deck park of 6 aircraft. Her light AA armament was also augmented by the addition of 10 Oerlikon 20 mm autocannon in single mounts. In addition the two steel fire curtains in the hangar were replaced by asbestos ones. After her return to the UK later that year, her Type 79Z radar was replaced by a Type 281 system and a Type 285 gunnery radar was mounted on one of the main fire-control directors. The additional crewmen, maintenance personnel and facilities needed to support these aircraft, weapons and sensors increased her complement to 1,326.

During her 1943 refits, the flight deck was modified to extend its usable length to 740 feet (225.6 m), and "outriggers" were probably added at this time. These were U-shaped beams that extended from the side of the flight deck into which aircraft tailwheels were placed. The aircraft were pushed back until the main wheels were near the edge of the flight deck to allow more aircraft to be stored on the deck. Twin Oerlikon mounts replaced most of the single mounts. Other twin mounts were added so that by May she had a total of eighteen twin and two single mounts. The Type 281 radar was replaced by an upgraded Type 281M, and a single-antenna Type 79M was added. Type 282 gunnery radars were added for each of the "pom-pom" directors, and the rest of the main directors were fitted with Type 285 radars. A Type 272 target-indicator radar was mounted above her bridge. These changes increased her aircraft capacity to 57 and caused her crew to grow to 1,831.

A year later, in preparation for her service against the Japanese in the Pacific, one starboard octuple "pom-pom" mount, directly abaft the island, was replaced by two 40 mm Bofors AA guns. Two more twin Oerlikon mounts were added, and her boilers were retubed. At this time her complement was 1,997 officers and enlisted men. By 1945, accumulated wear-and-tear as well as undiagnosed shock damage to Illustrious's machinery caused severe vibrations in her centre propeller shaft at high speeds. In an effort to cure the problem, the propeller was removed, and the shaft was locked in place in February; these radical measures succeeded in reducing, but not eliminating, the vibrations and reduced the ship's speed to about 24 knots (44 km/h; 28 mph).

=== Post-war modifications ===
Illustrious had been badly damaged underwater by a bomb in April 1945, and was ordered home for repairs the following month. She began permanent repairs in June that were scheduled to last four months. The RN planned to fit her out as a flagship, remove her aft 4.5-inch guns in exchange for increased accommodation, and replace some of her Oerlikons with single two-pounder AA guns, but the end of the war in August caused the RN to reassess its needs. In September, it decided that the Illustrious would become the trials and training carrier for the Home Fleet and her repairs were changed into a lengthy refit that lasted until June 1946. Her complement was sharply reduced by her change in role and she retained her aft 4.5-inch guns. Her light AA armament now consisted of six octuple "pom-pom" mountings, eighteen single Oerlikons, and seventeen single and two twin Bofors mounts. The flight deck was extended forward, which increased her overall length to 748 feet 6 inches (228.1 m). The high-angle director atop the island was replaced with an American SM-1 fighter-direction radar, a Type 293M target-indication system was added, and the Type 281M was replaced with a prototype Type 960 early-warning radar. The sum total of the changes since her commissioning increased her full-load displacement by 2,520 long tons (2,560 t). In 1947 she carried five 8-barrel pom-poms, 17 Bofors and 16 Oerlikons. A five-bladed propeller was installed on her centre shaft although the increasing wear on her outer shafts later partially negated the reduction in vibration. While running trials in 1948, after another refit, she reached a maximum speed of 29 knots (54 km/h; 33 mph) from 110,680 shp (82,530 kW). Two years later, she made 29.2 knots from 111,450 shp (83,110 kW). At some point after 1948, the ship's light AA armament was reduced to two twin and nineteen single 40 mm guns and six Oerlikons.

== Construction and service ==
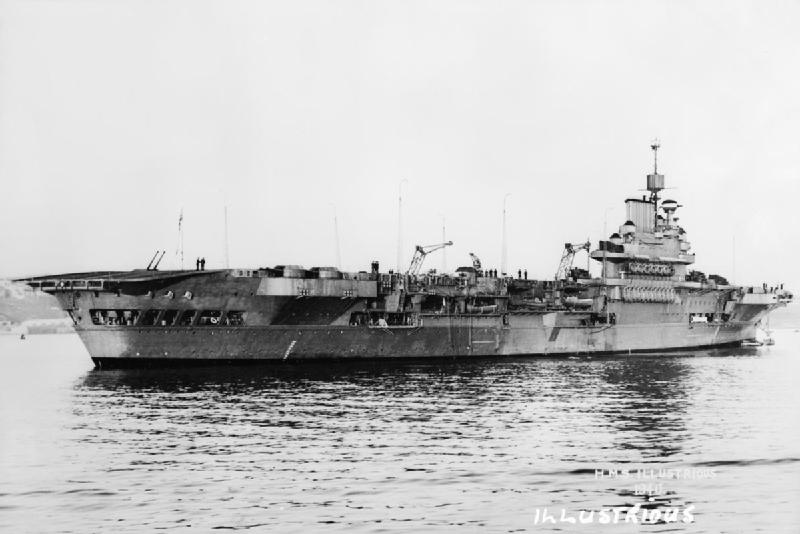
Illustrious at anchor in 1940

Illustrious, the fourth ship of her name, was ordered as part of the 1936 Naval Programme from Vickers-Armstrongs on 13 April 1937. Construction was delayed by slow deliveries of her armour plates because the industry had been crippled by a lack of orders over the last 15 years as a result of the Washington Naval Treaty. As a consequence, her flight-deck armour had to be ordered from Vítkovice Mining and Iron Corporation in Czechoslovakia. She was laid down at their Barrow-in-Furness shipyard two weeks later as yard number 732 and launched on 5 April 1939. She was christened by Lady Henderson, wife of the recently retired Third Sea Lord. Illustrious was then towed to Buccleuch Dock for fitting out and Captain Denis Boyd was appointed to command her on 29 January 1940. She was commissioned on 16 April 1940 and, excluding her armament, she cost £2,295,000 to build.

While Illustrious was being moved in preparation for her acceptance trials on 24 April, the tugboat Poolgarth capsized with the loss of three crewmen. The carrier conducted preliminary flying trials in the Firth of Clyde with six Fairey Swordfish torpedo bombers that had been craned aboard earlier. In early June, she loaded the personnel from 806, 815, and 819 Squadrons at Devonport Royal Dockyard; 806 Squadron was equipped with Blackburn Skua dive bombers and Fairey Fulmar fighters, and the latter two squadrons were equipped with Swordfish. She began working up off Plymouth, but the German conquest of France made this too risky, and Illustrious sailed for Bermuda later in the month to continue working up. This was complete by 23 July, when she arrived in the Clyde and flew off her aircraft. The ship was docked in Clydeside for a minor refit the following day; she arrived in Scapa Flow on 15 August, and became the flagship of Rear Admiral Lumley Lyster. Her squadrons flew back aboard, and she sailed for the Mediterranean on 22 August with 15 Fulmars and 18 Swordfish aboard.

After refuelling in Gibraltar, Illustrious and the battleship Valiant were escorted into the Mediterranean by Force H as part of Operation Hats, during which her Fulmars shot down five Italian bombers and her AA guns shot down two more. Now escorted by the bulk of the Mediterranean Fleet, eight of her Swordfish, together with some from the carrier Eagle, attacked the Italian seaplane base at Rhodes on the morning of 3 September. A few days after the Italian invasion of Egypt, Illustrious flew off 15 Swordfish during the moonlit night of 16/17 September to attack the port of Benghazi. Aircraft from 819 Squadron laid six mines in the harbour entrance while those from 815 Squadron sank the destroyer Borea and two freighters totalling 10,192 gross register tons (GRT). The destroyer Aquilone later struck one of the mines and sank. During the return voyage to Alexandria, the Italian submarine Corallo made an unsuccessful attack on the British ships. While escorting a convoy to Malta on 29 September, the carrier's Fulmars broke up attacks by Italian high-level and torpedo bombers, shooting down one for the loss of one fighter. While returning from another convoy escort mission, the Swordfish of Illustrious and Eagle attacked the Italian airfield on the island of Leros on the evening of 13/14 October.

=== Battle of Taranto ===
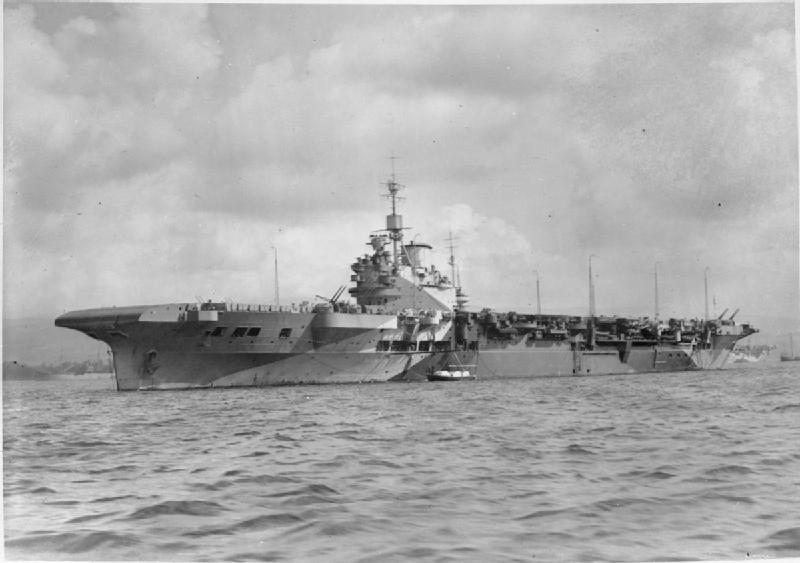
Oblique bow view of Illustrious at anchor

Upon his arrival in the Mediterranean, Lyster proposed a carrier airstrike on the Italian fleet at its base in Taranto, as the Royal Navy had been planning since the Abyssinia Crisis of 1935, and Admiral Andrew Cunningham, commander of the Mediterranean Fleet, approved the idea by 22 September 1940. The attack, with both available carriers, was originally planned for 21 October, the anniversary of the Battle of Trafalgar, but a hangar fire aboard Illustrious on 18 October forced its postponement until 11 November when the next favourable phase of the moon occurred. The fire destroyed three Swordfish and heavily damaged two others, but they were replaced by aircraft from Eagle, whose contaminated fuel tanks prevented her from participating in the attack.

Repairs were completed before the end of the month, and she escorted a convoy to Greece, during which her Fulmars shot down one shadowing CANT Z.506B floatplane. She sailed from Alexandria on 6 November, escorted by the battleships Warspite, Malaya, and Valiant, two light cruisers, and 13 destroyers, to provide air cover for another convoy to Malta. At this time her air group was reinforced by several of Eagle's Gloster Sea Gladiators supplementing the fighters of 806 Squadron as well as torpedo bombers from 813 and 824 Squadrons. The former aircraft were carried "...as a permanent deck park..." (Note: Although Illustrious's hangar must have been full, the Sea Gladiator had fixed wings and could not be struck below, as they were too large for the lifts.) and they shot down a CANT Z.501 seaplane two days later. Later that day seven Savoia-Marchetti SM.79 medium bombers were intercepted by three Fulmars, which claimed to have shot down one bomber and damaged another. In reality, they heavily damaged three of the Italian aircraft. A Z.501 searching for the fleet was shot down on 10 November by a Fulmar and another on the 11th. A flight of nine SM.79s was intercepted later that day and the Fulmars claimed to have damaged one of the bombers, although it actually failed to return to base. Three additional Fulmars had been flown aboard from Ark Royal a few days earlier, when both carriers were near Malta; that brought its strength up to 15 Fulmars, 24 Swordfish, and two to four Sea Gladiators. Three Swordfish crashed shortly after take-off on 10 and 11 November, probably due to fuel contamination, and the maintenance crewmen spent all day laboriously draining all the fuel tanks and refilling them with clean petrol. This left only 21 aircraft available for the attack.

Battle of Taranto map

Now augmented by reinforcements from the UK, the Mediterranean Fleet detached Illustrious, four cruisers, and four destroyers to a point 170 miles (270 km) south-east of Taranto. The first wave of a dozen aircraft, all that the ship could launch at one time, flew off by 20:40 and the second wave of nine by 21:34. Six aircraft in each airstrike were armed with torpedoes and the remainder with bombs or flares or both to supplement the three-quarter moon. The Royal Air Force (RAF) had positioned a Short Sunderland flying boat off the harbour to search for any movement to or from the port and this was detected at 17:55 by acoustic locators and again at 20:40, alerting the defenders. The noise of the on-coming first airstrike was heard at 22:25 and the anti-aircraft guns defending the port opened fire shortly afterwards, as did those on the ships in the harbour. The torpedo-carrying aircraft of the first wave scored one hit on the battleship Conte di Cavour and two on the recently completed battleship Littorio while the two flare droppers bombed the oil storage depot with little effect. The four aircraft loaded with bombs set one hangar in the seaplane base on fire and hit the destroyer Libeccio with one bomb that failed to detonate. The destroyer Fulmine, or Conte di Cavour, shot down the aircraft that put a torpedo into the latter ship, but the remaining aircraft returned to Illustrious.

One torpedo-carrying aircraft of the second wave was forced to return when its long-range external fuel tank fell off, but the others hit the Littorio once more and the Duilio was hit once when they attacked beginning at 23:55. The two flare droppers also bombed the oil storage depot with minimal effect, and one bomb penetrated through the hull of the heavy cruiser Trento without detonating. One torpedo bomber was shot down, but the other aircraft returned. A follow on airstrike was planned for the next night based on the pessimistic assessments of the aircrews, but it was cancelled due to bad weather. Reconnaissance photos taken by the R.A.F. showed three battleships with their decks awash and surrounded by pools of oil. The two airstrikes had changed the balance of power in the Mediterranean by rendering the Conte di Cavour unavailable for the rest of the war, and badly damaging the Littorio and the Duilio.

=== Subsequent operations in the Mediterranean ===
While en route to Alexandria the ship's Fulmars engaged four CANT Z.506Bs, claiming three shot down and the fourth damaged, although Italian records indicate the loss of only two aircraft on 12 November. Two weeks later, 15 Swordfish attacked Italian positions on Leros, losing one Swordfish. While off Malta two days later, six of the carrier's fighters engaged an equal number of Fiat CR.42 Falco biplane fighters, shooting down one and damaging two others. One Fulmar was lightly damaged during the battle. On the night of 16/17 December, 11 Swordfish bombed Rhodes and the island of Stampalia with little effect. Four days later Illustrious's aircraft attacked two convoys near the Kerkennah Islands and sank two merchant ships totalling 7,437 GRT. On the morning of 22 December, 13 Swordfish attacked Tripoli harbour, starting fires and hitting warehouses multiple times. The ship arrived back at Alexandria two days later.

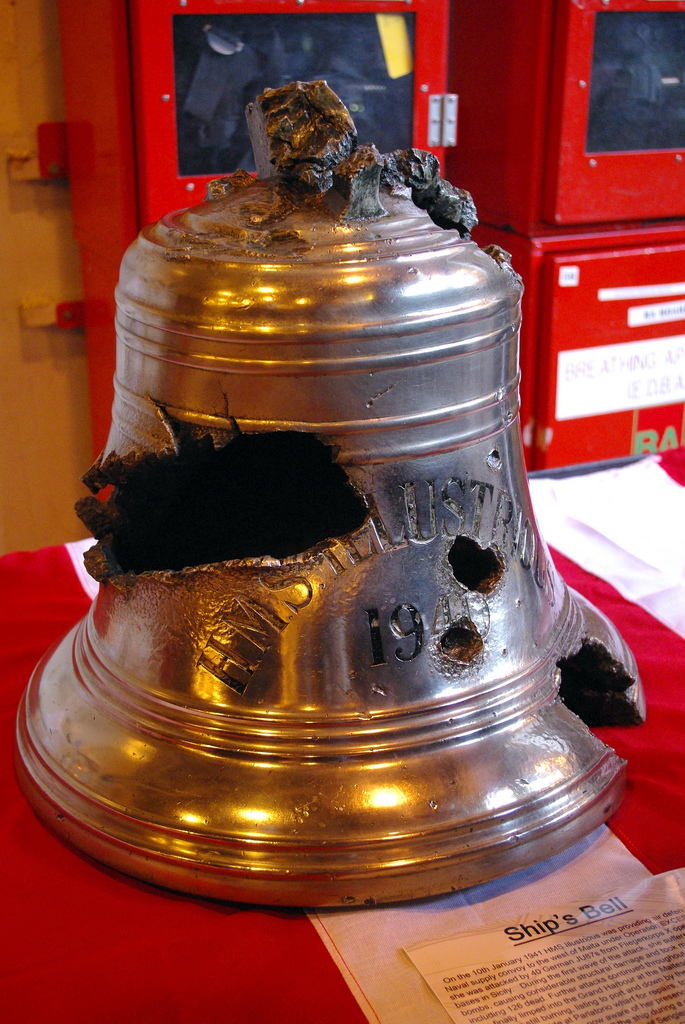
Her ship's bell that was damaged during the January 1941 attacks

On 7 January 1941, Illustrious set sail to provide air cover for convoys to Piraeus, Greece and Malta as part of Operation Excess. For this operation, her fighters were reinforced by a detachment of three Fulmars from 805 Squadron. During the morning of 10 January, her Swordfish attacked an Italian convoy without significant effect. Later that morning three of the five Fulmars on Combat Air Patrol (CAP) engaged three SM.79s at low altitude, claiming one shot down. One Fulmar was damaged and forced to return to the carrier, while the other two exhausted their ammunition and fuel during the combat and landed at Hal Far airfield on Malta. The remaining pair engaged a pair of torpedo-carrying SM.79s, damaging one badly enough that it crashed upon landing. They were low on ammunition and out of position, as they chased the Italian aircraft over 50 miles (80 km) from Illustrious. The carrier launched four replacements at 12:35, just when 24–36 Junkers Ju 87 Stuka dive bombers of the First Group/Dive Bomber Wing 1 (I. Gruppe/Sturzkampfgeschwader (StG) 1) and the Second Group/Dive Bomber Wing 2 (II. Gruppe/StG 2) began their attack, led by Paul-Werner Hozzel. Another pair were attempting to take off when the first 250-or-500-kilogram (550 or 1,100 lb) bomb struck just forward of the aft lift, destroying the Fulmar whose engine had failed to start and detonating high in the lift well; the other aircraft took off and engaged the Stukas as they pulled out of their dive.

The ship was hit five more times in this attack, one of which penetrated the un-armoured aft lift and detonated beneath it, destroying it and the surrounding structure. One bomb struck and destroyed the starboard forward "pom-pom" mount closest to the island, while another passed through the foremost port "pom-pom" mount and failed to detonate, although it did start a fire. One bomb penetrated the outer edge of the forward port flight deck and detonated about 10 feet (3.0 m) above the water, riddling the adjacent hull structure with holes which caused flooding in some compartments and starting a fire. The most damaging hit was a large bomb that penetrated through the deck armour forward of the aft lift and detonated 10 feet above the hangar deck. The explosion started a severe fire, destroyed the rear fire sprinkler system, bent the forward lift like a hoop and shredded the fire curtains into lethal splinters. It also blew a hole in the hangar deck, damaging areas three decks below. The Stukas also near-missed Illustrious with two bombs, which caused minor damage and flooding. The hits at the aft end of the carrier knocked out her steering gear, although it was soon repaired.

Another attack by 13 Ju 87s at 13:20 hit the ship once more in the aft lift well, which again knocked out her steering and reduced her speed to 15 knots (28 km/h; 17 mph). This attack was intercepted by six of the ship's Fulmars which had rearmed and refuelled ashore after they had dropped their bombs, but only two of the dive bombers were damaged before the Fulmars ran out of ammunition. The carrier, steering by engines, was attacked several more times before she entered Grand Harbour breakwater at 21:04, still on fire. The attacks killed 126 officers and men and wounded 91. Nine Swordfish and five Fulmars were destroyed during the attack. Another Swordfish, piloted by Lieutenant Charles Lamb, was attempting to land when the bombs began to strike and was forced to ditch when it ran out of fuel; the crew was rescued by the destroyer Juno. The British fighters claimed to have shot down five Ju 87s, with the fleet's anti-aircraft fire claiming three others. Germans records show the loss of three Stukas, with another forced to make an emergency landing.

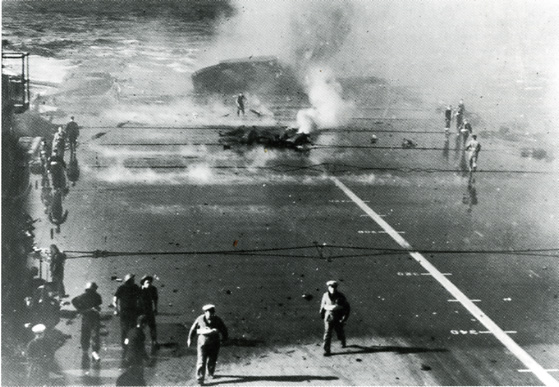
The wreckage of the aft lift is visible through the smoke behind the hole made by the only bomb to penetrate through the ship's flight-deck armour

While her steering was being repaired in Malta, the Illustrious was bombed again on 16 January by 17 Junkers Ju 88 medium bombers and 44 Stukas. The pilots of 806 Squadron claimed to have shot down two of the former and possibly damaged another pair, but a 1,100 lb (500 kg) bomb penetrated her flight deck aft of the rear lift and detonated in the captain's day cabin; several other bombs nearly hit the ship but only caused minor damage. Two days later, one of three Fulmars that intercepted an Axis air raid on the Maltese airfields was shot down with no survivors. Only one Fulmar was serviceable on 19 January, when the carrier was attacked several times and it was shot down. Illustrious was not struck during these attacks but was near-missed several times and the resulting shock waves from their detonations dislodged enough hull plating to cause an immediate 5-degree list, cracked the cast-iron foundations of her port turbine, and damaged other machinery. The naval historian J. D. Brown noted that "There is no doubt that the armoured deck saved her from destruction; no other carrier took anything like this level of punishment and survived."

Without aircraft aboard, she sailed to Alexandria on 23 January escorted by four destroyers, for temporary repairs that lasted until 10 March. Boyd was promoted to rear admiral on 18 February and relieved Lyster as Rear Admiral Aircraft Carriers. He transferred his flag to Formidable when she arrived at Alexandria on 10 March, just before Illustrious sailed for Port Said to begin her transit of the Suez Canal. The Germans had laid mines in the canal earlier. Clearing the mines and the ships sunk by them was a slow process and Illustrious did not reach Suez Bay until 20 March. The ship then sailed for Durban, South Africa, to have the extent of her underwater damage assessed in the dry dock there. She reached Durban on 4 April and remained there for two weeks. The ship arrived at the Norfolk Navy Yard in the United States on 12 May for permanent repairs.

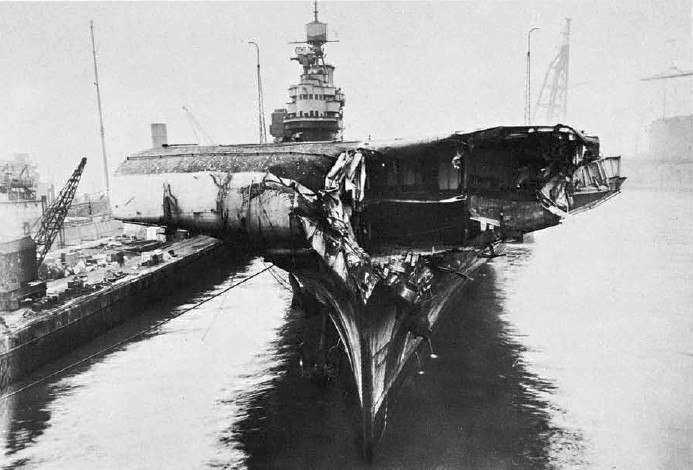
Illustrious's bow after colliding with Formidable, 16 December 1941

Some important modifications were made to her flight deck arrangements, including the installation of a new aft lift and modification of the catapult for use by American-built aircraft. Her light anti-aircraft armament was also augmented during the refit. Captain Lord Louis Mountbatten relieved her acting captain on 12 August, although he did not arrive aboard her until 28 August. He was almost immediately sent on a speaking tour to influence American public opinion, until he was recalled home in October and relieved by Captain A. G. Talbot on 1 October. The work was completed in November and Illustrious departed on 25 October, for trials off Jamaica and to load the dozen Swordfish of 810 NAS and 829 NAS. She returned to Norfolk on 9 December, to rendezvous with Formidable, which had also been repaired there, and the carriers sailed for home three days later. On the night of 15/16 December, Illustrious collided with Formidable in a moderate storm. Neither ship was seriously damaged, but Illustrious had to reduce speed to shore up sprung bulkheads in the bow and conduct temporary repairs to the forward flight deck. She arrived at Greenock on 21 December and permanent repairs were made from 30 December to late February 1942 at Cammell Laird's shipyard in Birkenhead. While working up her air group in March, reinforced by the Martlet fighters (the British name of the F4F Wildcat) of 881 NAS and 882 NAS, she conducted trials of a "hooked" Spitfire fighter, the prototype of the Seafire.

=== In the Indian Ocean ===
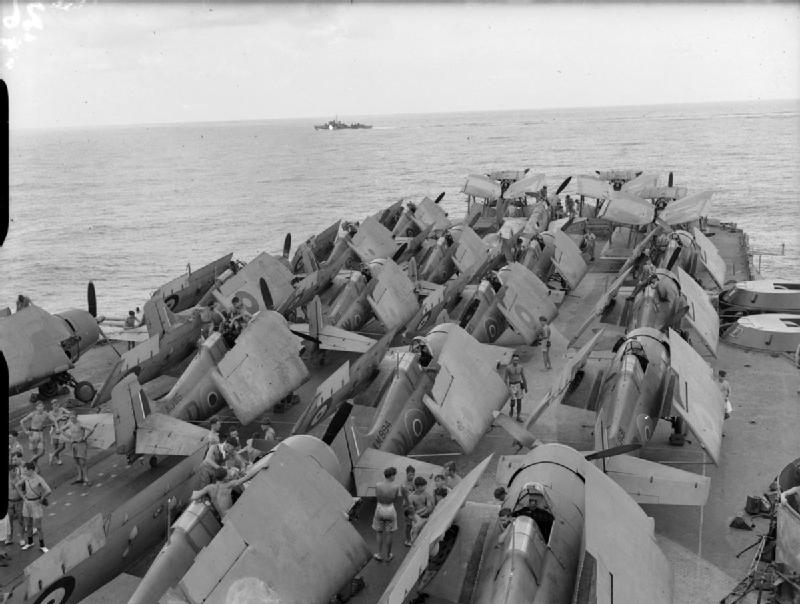
Martlets, Swordfish, and one Fulmar ranged on the bow after rehearsals for Operation Ironclad, 3 May 1942

The conquest of British Malaya and the Dutch East Indies in early 1942 opened the door for Japanese advances into the Indian Ocean. The Vichy French-controlled island of Madagascar stood astride the line of communication between India and the UK and the British were worried that the French would accede to occupation of the island as they had to the Japanese occupation of French Indochina in 1940. Preventing this required a preemptive invasion of Diego Suarez scheduled for May 1942. Illustrious had her work up cut short on 19 March to prepare to join the Eastern Fleet in the Indian Ocean and participate in the attack. She sailed four days later, having embarked twenty-one Swordfish, nine Martlet IIs of 881 Squadron and six Martlet Is of 882 Squadron, and two Fulmar fighters prior to escorting a troop convoy carrying some of the men allocated for the assault. A hangar fire broke out on 2 April that destroyed 11 aircraft and killed one crewman, but failed to cause any serious damage to the ship. Repairs were made in Freetown, Sierra Leone, where her destroyed aircraft were replaced and augmented by twelve additional Martlet II fighters from HMS Archer, while two Martlet I aircraft were, in turn, transferred to Archer, bringing Illustrious's total aircraft complement to 47. After her stay at Freetown, Illustrious proceeded to Durban; during the voyage her staff also fitted ASV radar to the replacement Swordfish. One Martlet I was fitted with folding wings.

Illustrious's aircraft were tasked to attack French naval units and shipping and to defend the invasion fleet, while her half-sister Indomitable provided air support for the ground forces. For the operation the carrier's air group numbered 25 Martlets, 1 night-fighting Fulmar and 21 Swordfish, and was consequently forced to have a permanent deck park of 5 Martlets and one Swordfish. Before dawn on 5 May, she launched 18 Swordfish together with 8 Martlets. The first flight of 6 Swordfish, carrying torpedoes, unsuccessfully attacked the aviso D'Entrecasteaux, but sank the armed merchant cruiser MS Bougainville. The second flight, carrying depth charges, sank the submarine Bévéziers while the third flight dropped leaflets over the defenders before attacking an artillery battery and D'Entrecasteaux. One aircraft of the third flight was forced to make an emergency landing and its crew was captured by the French. Later in the day, D'Entrecasteaux attempted to put to sea, but she was successfully bombed by an 829 Squadron Swordfish and deliberately run aground to avoid sinking. Three other Swordfish completed her destruction. The next morning, Martlets from 881 Squadron intercepted three Potez 63.11 reconnaissance bombers, shooting down two and forcing the other to retreat, while Swordfish dropped dummy parachutists as a diversion. One patrolling Swordfish sank the submarine Le Héros and another spotted for ships bombarding French defences. On the morning of 7 May, Martlets from 881 Squadron intercepted three Morane-Saulnier M.S.406 fighters on a reconnaissance mission. All three were shot down for the loss of one Martlet. In addition to the other losses enumerated, 882 Squadron's Fulmar was shot down while providing ground support. Illustrious' aircraft flew 209 sorties and suffered six deck landing crashes, including four by Martlets.

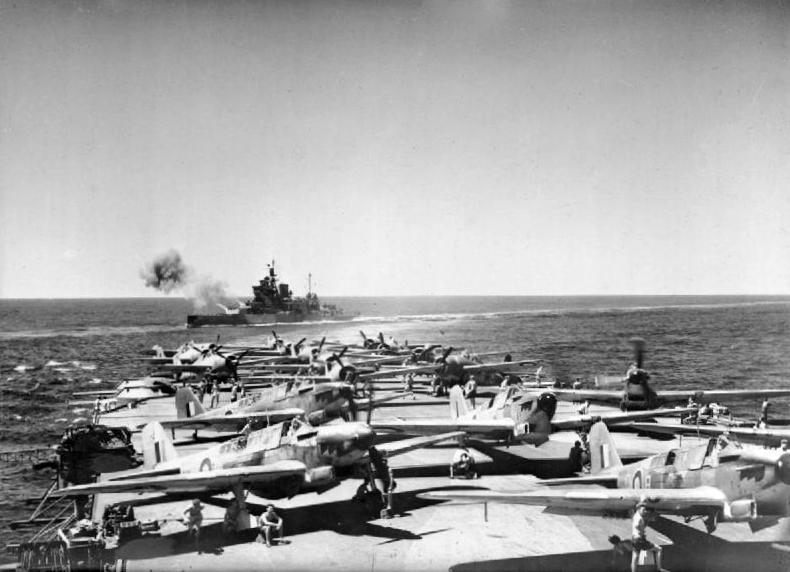
Valiant conducting gunnery training to the rear of Illustrious. Fulmars of 806 Squadron are preparing to take off while Martlets of 881 Squadron are behind them.

She was then formally assigned to the Eastern Fleet and, after a short refit in Durban, sailed to Colombo, Ceylon, and became the flagship of the Rear Admiral Aircraft Carriers, Eastern Fleet, Denis Boyd, her former captain. At the beginning of August, the ship participated in Operation Stab, a decoy invasion of the Andaman Islands to distract the Japanese when the Americans were beginning the Guadalcanal campaign in the South Pacific. Captain Robert Cunliffe relieved Talbott on 22 August. On 10 September the carrier covered the amphibious landing that opened operations Stream, Line and Jane, the occupation of the remainder of Madagascar, and the landing at Tamatave eight days later, but no significant resistance was encountered and her aircraft were not needed. For this operation she had aboard six Fulmars of 806 Squadron, 23 Martlets of 881 Squadron and 18 Swordfish of 810 and 829 Squadrons.

=== European waters ===
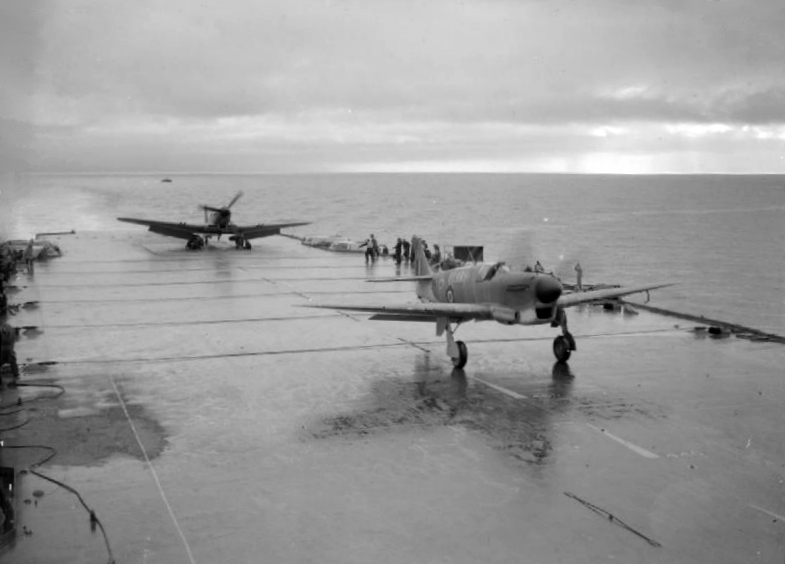
A prototype Fairey Firefly taking off with a prototype Blackburn Firebrand behind it, during deck-landing trials, February 1943

After a farewell visit from the Eastern Fleet commander, Admiral Sir James Somerville on 12 January 1943, Illustrious sailed for home the next day. She flew off her aircraft to Gibraltar on 31 January and continued on to the Clyde where she arrived five days later. She conducted deck-landing trials for prototypes of the Blackburn Firebrand and Fairey Firefly fighters, as well as the Fairey Barracuda dive/torpedo bomber from 8 to 10 February. On 26 February she began a refit at Birkenhead that lasted until 7 June during which her flight deck was extended, new radars were installed, her light anti-aircraft armament was augmented, and two new arrestor wires were fitted aft of the rear lift which increased her effective landing area. While conducting her post-refit trials, she also conducted flying trials for Martlet Vs and Barracudas. Both sets of trials were completed by 18 July, by which time the Illustrious had joined the Home Fleet.

On 26 July, she sortied for the Norwegian Sea as part of Operation Governor, together with the battleship Anson, the American battleship Alabama, and the light carrier Unicorn, an attempt to fool the Germans into thinking that Sicily was not the only objective for an Allied invasion. 810 Squadron was the only unit retained from her previous air group and it had been re-equipped with Barracudas during her refit. Her fighter complement was augmented by 878 and 890 Squadrons, each with 10 Martlet Vs, and 894 Squadron with 10 Seafire IICs. These latter aircraft lacked folding wings and could not fit on the lifts. The British ships were spotted by Blohm & Voss BV 138 flying boats and 890 Squadron shot down two of them before the fleet returned to Scapa Flow on 29 July. She transferred to Greenock at the end of the month and sailed on 5 August to provide air cover for the ocean liner RMS Queen Mary as she conveyed Prime Minister Winston Churchill to the Quebec Conference. Once the convoy was out of range of German aircraft, the Illustrious left the convoy and arrived back at Greenock on 8 August.

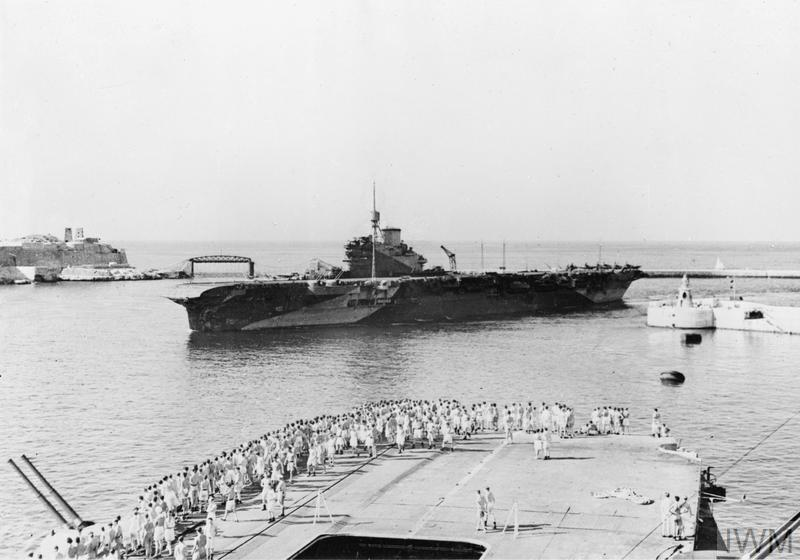
Illustrious steams into Grand Harbour, Valletta, Malta, October 1943

Together with the Unicorn, she sailed for the Mediterranean on 13 August to prepare for the landings at Salerno (Operation Avalanche), reaching Malta a week later. Her air group was reinforced at this time by four more Martlets each for 878 and 890 Squadrons. She was assigned to Force H for the operation which was tasked to protect the amphibious force from attack by the Italian Fleet and provide air cover for the carriers supporting the assault force. The Italians made no effort to attack the Allied forces, and the most noteworthy thing that any of her aircraft did was when one of 890 Squadron's Martlets escorted a surrendering Italian aircraft to Sicily. Before the Illustrious steamed for Malta she transferred six Seafires to the Unicorn to replace some of the latter's aircraft wrecked in deck-landing accidents. Four of these then flew ashore to conduct operations until they rejoined Illustrious on 14 September at Malta.

She then returned to Britain on 18 October for a quick refit at Birkenhead that included further improvements to the flight deck and the reinforcement of her light anti-aircraft armament. She embarked the Barracudas of 810 and 847 Squadrons of No. 21 Naval Torpedo-Bomber Reconnaissance Wing on 27 November before beginning her work up three days later. No. 15 Naval Fighter Wing with the Vought Corsairs of 1830 and 1833 Squadrons were still training ashore and flew aboard before the work up was finished on 27 December.

=== Return to the Indian Ocean ===
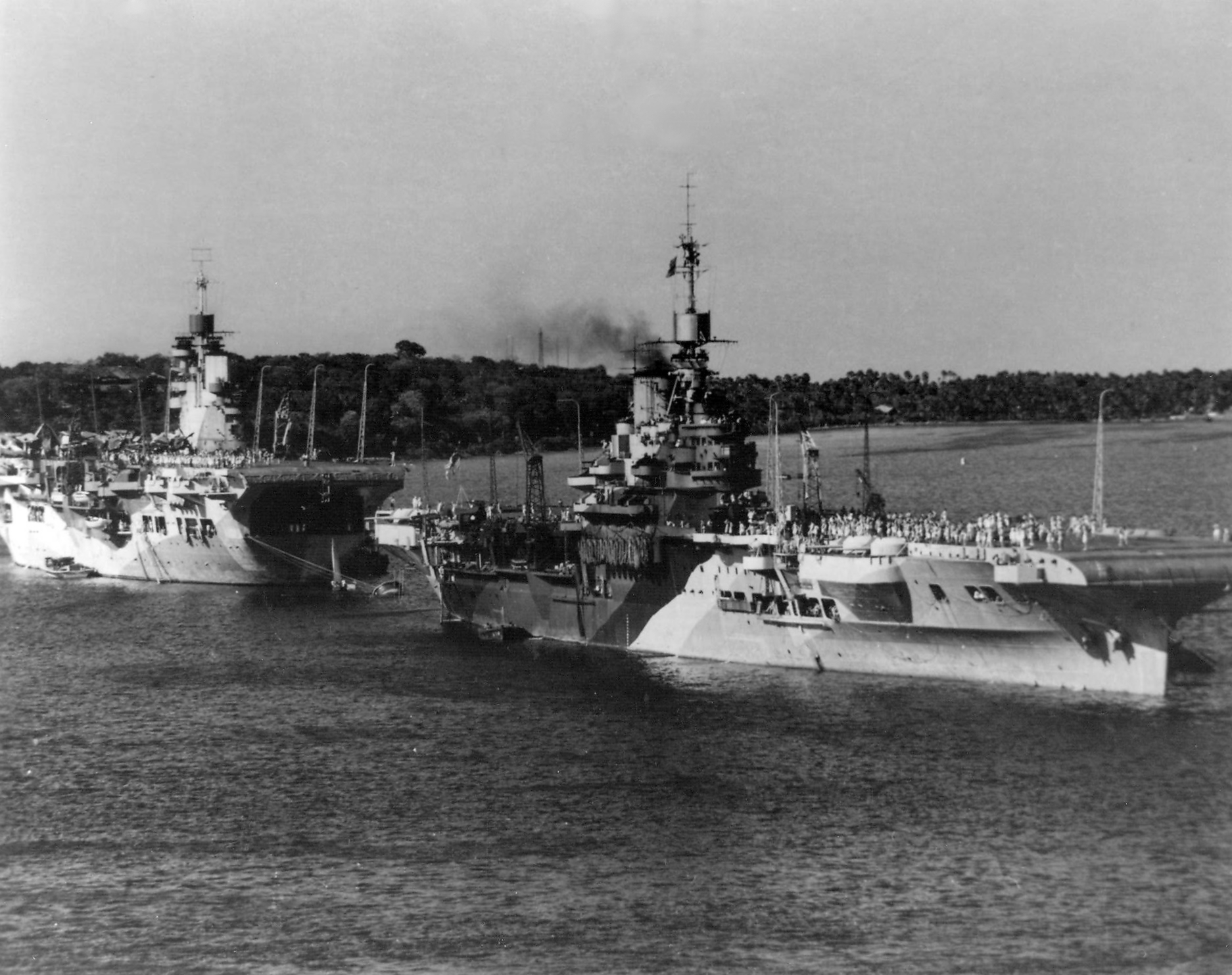
Illustrious (right) and Unicorn (left) anchored in 1944

Illustrious departed Britain on 30 December and arrived in Trincomalee, Ceylon, on 28 January 1944. She spent most of the next several months training although she participated in several sorties with the Eastern Fleet searching for Japanese warships in the Bay of Bengal and near the coast of Sumatra. The fleet departed Trincomalee on 21 March to rendezvous with the American carrier Saratoga in preparation for combined operations against the Japanese facilities in the Dutch East Indies and the Andaman Islands. The first operation carried out by both carriers was an airstrike on the small naval base at Sabang at the northern tip of Sumatra (Operation Cockpit). The carrier's air group consisted of 21 Barracudas and 28 Corsairs for the operation; Illustrious launched 17 of the former escorted by 13 of the latter on the morning of 19 April. The American bombers attacked the shipping in the harbour while the British aircraft attacked the shore installations. The oil storage tanks were destroyed and the port facilities badly damaged by the Barracudas. There was no aerial opposition and the fighters claimed to have destroyed 24 aircraft on the ground. All British aircraft returned safely although one American fighter was forced to ditch during the return home.

The Saratoga was ordered to depart for home for a refit by 19 May and Somerville wanted to mount one more attack as she was leaving the Indian Ocean. He chose the naval base and oil refinery at Surabaya, Java (Operation Transom), and the distance from the newly renamed East Indies Fleet's base at Ceylon required refuelling at Exmouth Gulf on the western coast of Australia before the attack. The necessity to attack from the south, across the full width of Java, meant that the target was outside the Barracuda's range and 810 and 847 Squadrons were replaced by the 18 Grumman Avengers of 832 and 845 Squadrons for the mission. Early on the morning of 17 May, the ship launched all 18 Avengers, escorted by 16 Corsairs. One Avenger crashed on take-off and an American Avenger was shot down over the target; only one small ship was sunk, and little damage was done to the refinery. The Saratoga and her escorts separated after refuelling again in Exmouth Gulf and the East Indies Fleet was back in Trincomalee on 27 May where No. 21 Wing reembarked.

On 10 June, the Illustrious and the escort carrier Atheling put to sea to simulate another airstrike on Sabang as a means of distracting the Japanese while the Americans were attacking airfields in the Mariana Islands and preparing to invade the island of Saipan. For the planned attack on Port Blair in the Andaman Islands in mid-June her air group was reinforced by the 14 Corsairs of 1837 Squadron; six Barracudas from No. 21 TBR Wing were landed to make room for the additional fighters which increased her air complement to 57. On 21 June, the ship launched 15 Barracudas and 23 Corsairs against the airfield and harbour of Port Blair. Two of the Barracudas were forced to return with engine trouble before the attack began and another was shot down over the target. In addition, one Corsair was forced to ditch; the pilot was rescued by a destroyer. Bad weather degraded the accuracy of the Barracudas and little damage was inflicted aside from a few aircraft destroyed on the ground and a few small craft sunk in the harbour. With over 50 aircraft airborne at one point, the British realised that a single deck accident might result in the loss of every aircraft in the air because there was no other carrier available to land aboard. The carrier and her escorts arrived back at Trincomalee on 23 June where 847 Squadron was merged into 810 Squadron a week later.

Her sister ships, the Indomitable and the Victorious arrived at the end of June although only the latter's pilots were combat-ready. Captain Charles Lambe was appointed as the new captain of the Illustrious on 21 May, but he could not join his new ship until 9 July. Somerville decided to attack Sabang again (Operation Crimson), although the ships of the East Indies Fleet would bombard the port while the fighters from the Illustrious and the Victorious spotted for them and protected the fleet. As the Barracudas were needed only for anti-submarine patrols, the former embarked only nine while the latter ship flew off all her Barracudas. On the early morning of 25 July, Illustrious launched 22 Corsairs for CAP and to observe the naval gunfire and take photos for post-attack damage assessments. The bombardment was very effective, sinking two small freighters, and severely damaging the oil storage and port facilities. One Corsair was shot down by Japanese flak although the pilot was rescued after ditching. As the fleet was withdrawing, Illustrious's CAP intercepted and shot down a Nakajima Ki-43 (codenamed "Oscar") fighter and a Mitsubishi Ki-21 "Sally" medium bomber on reconnaissance missions. Later in the day her Corsairs intercepted 10 Ki-43s and shot down two of them while driving off the remainder. After arriving in Trincomalee, 1837 Squadron was transferred to the Victorious.

On 30 July, she sailed for Durban to begin a refit that lasted from 15 August to 10 October and arrived back at Trincomalee on 1 November. 810 Squadron and its Barracudas were transferred off the ship the next day and were later replaced by the Avengers of 854 Squadron. For the next six weeks she carried out an intensive flying regime in preparation for the next operations against the Japanese together with the other carriers of the fleet. On 22 November she was assigned to the newly formed British Pacific Fleet (BPF), commanded by Admiral Sir Bruce Fraser. She was assigned to the 1st Aircraft Carrier Squadron (1st ACS), commanded by Rear Admiral Sir Philip Vian when he arrived at Colombo aboard the carrier Indefatigable. A week later, Illustrious and Indomitable sortied to attack an oil refinery at Pangkalan Brandan, Sumatra (Operation Outflank); the former's airgroup now consisted of 36 Corsairs of 1830 and 1833 Squadrons and 21 Avengers of 857 Squadron. When the aircraft approached the target on the morning of 20 December, it was obscured by clouds so they diverted to the secondary target of the port at Belawan Deli. It was partially obscured by clouds and heavy squalls so the attacking aircraft had only moderate success, setting some structures on fire and destroying several aircraft on the ground.

On 16 January 1945 the BPF sailed for its primary base in the Pacific Ocean, Sydney, Australia. En route, the carriers of the 1st ACS attacked Palembang on 24 January and 29 January (Operation Meridian). Illustrious's air group consisted of 32 Corsairs and 21 Avengers by now and she contributed 12 of her Avengers and 16 Corsairs to the first attack, which destroyed most of the oil storage tanks and cut the refinery's output by half for three months. Five days later, the BPF attacked a different refinery and the ship launched 12 Avengers and 12 Corsairs. The attack was very successful at heavy cost; between the two air operations, her squadrons lost five Corsairs to enemy flak or fighters and one due to a mechanical problem on take-off as well as three Avengers to enemy action. Her Corsairs claimed four enemy aircraft shot down as did one Avenger pilot who claimed victory over a Nakajima Ki-44 "Tojo" fighter. The fleet's fire discipline was poor when it was attacked by seven Japanese bombers shortly after the strike aircraft began landing. The attackers were all shot down, but two shells fired by either Indomitable or the battleship King George V struck Illustrious, killing 12 and wounding 21 men.

=== Service in the Pacific Ocean ===
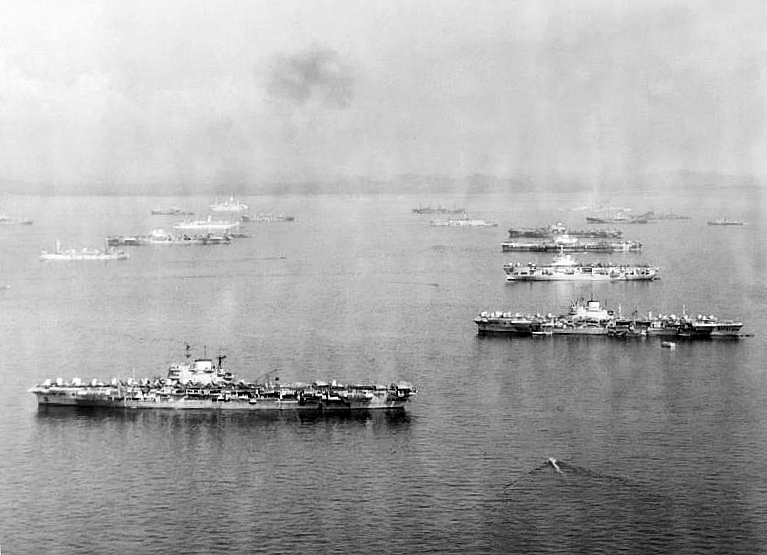
The main strength of the BPF in anchored in San Pedro Bay, April 1945. Illustrious is the second-closest ship to the photographer in the background left column.

She arrived on 10 February and repairs began when she entered the Captain Cook Dock in the Garden Island Dockyard the next day, well before it was officially opened by the Duke of Gloucester, the Governor-General of Australia on 24 March. By this time the vibration problems with her centre propeller shaft, which had never been properly repaired after she was bombed at Malta, were so bad that the propeller was removed and the shaft locked in place, reducing her maximum speed to 24 knots. On 6 March she sailed to the BPF's advance base at Manus Island and, after her arrival a week later, Illustrious and her sisters Indomitable and Victorious, as well as the carrier Indefatigable, exercised together before sailing for Ulithi on 18 March. The BPF joined the American Fifth Fleet there two days later, under the designation Task Force 57 (TF 57), to participate in the preliminary operations for the invasion of Okinawa (Operation Iceberg). The British role during the operation was to neutralise airfields on the Sakishima Islands, between Okinawa and Formosa, beginning on 26 March. Her air group now consisted of 36 Corsairs, 16 Avengers and two Supermarine Walrus flying boats for rescue work.

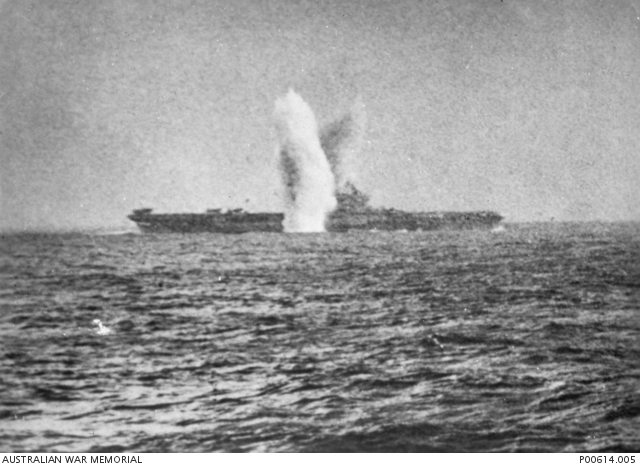
Kamikaze attack on Illustrious on 6 April

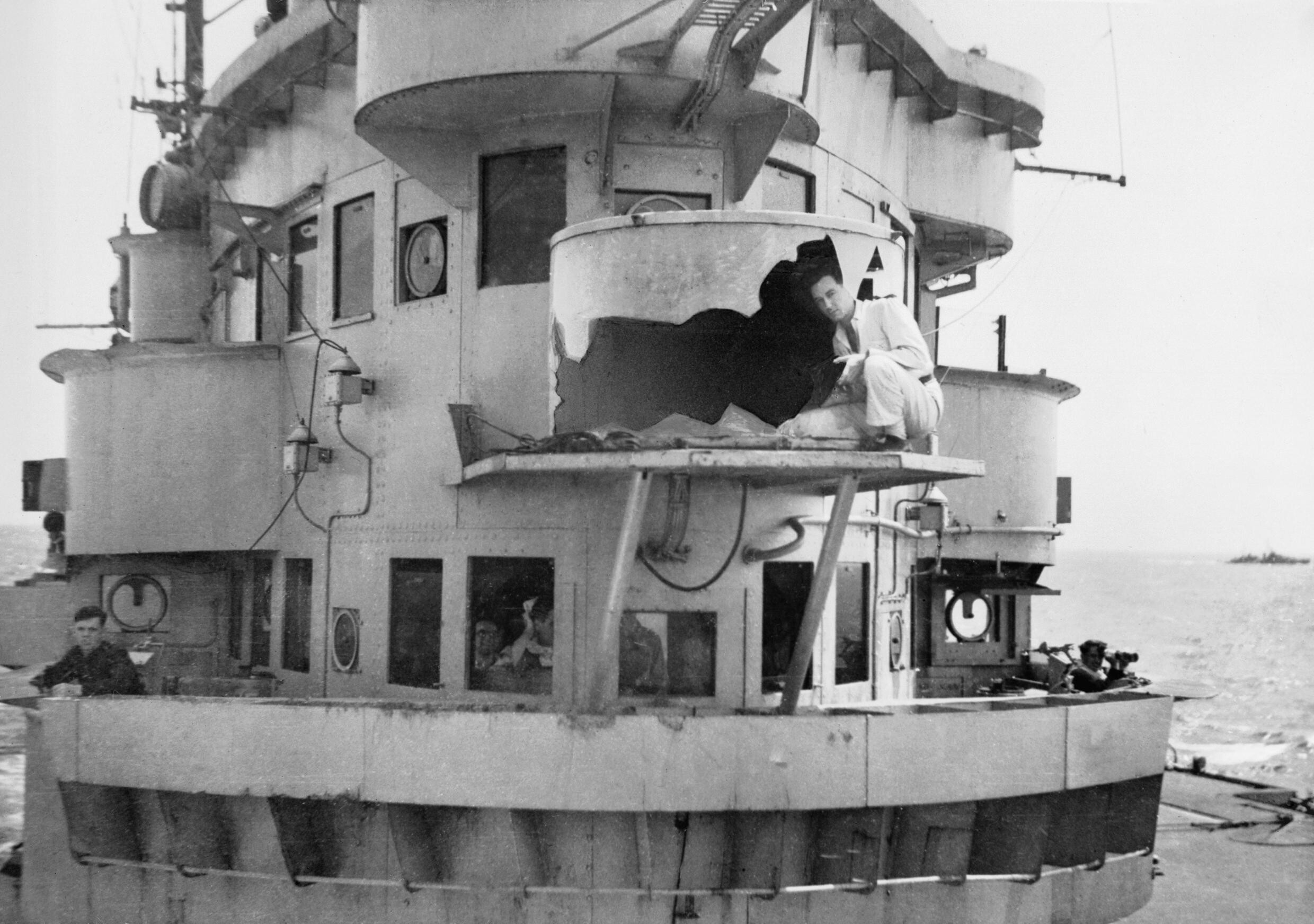
The only visible damage from the kamikaze hit

From 26 March to 9 April, the BPF attacked the airfields with each two-day period of flying operations followed by two or three days required to replenish fuel, ammunition and other supplies. While the precise details on activities of the carrier's squadrons are not readily available, it is known that the commanding officer of 854 Squadron was forced to ditch his Avenger on the morning of 27 March with the loss of both his crewmen; he was ultimately rescued that evening by an American submarine. On the afternoon of 6 April, four kamikaze aircraft evaded detection and interception by the CAP, and one, a Yokosuka D4Y3 "Judy" dive bomber, attacked Illustrious in a steep dive. The light AA guns managed to sever its port wing so that it missed the ship, although its starboard wingtip shattered the Type 272's radome mounted on the front of the bridge. When the 1,000-kilogram (2,200 lb) bomb that it was carrying detonated in the water only 50 feet (15.2 m) from the side of the ship, the resulting shock wave badly damaged two Corsairs parked on the deck and severely shook the ship. The initial damage assessment was that little harm had been done, although vibrations had worsened, but this was incorrect as the damage to the hull structure and plating proved to be extensive. Vice Admiral Sir Bernard Rawlings, commander of Task Force 57, ordered the recently arrived Formidable to join the task force to replace Illustrious on 8 April. In the meantime, she continued to conduct operations with the rest of the fleet. On 12 and 13 April, the BPF switched targets to airfields in northern Formosa and her sister joined the task force on 14 April. Since the beginning of the operation, her aircraft had flown 234 offensive and 209 defensive sorties, claiming at least two aircraft shot down. Her own losses were two Avengers and three Corsairs lost in action and one Avenger and six Corsairs due to non-combat causes.

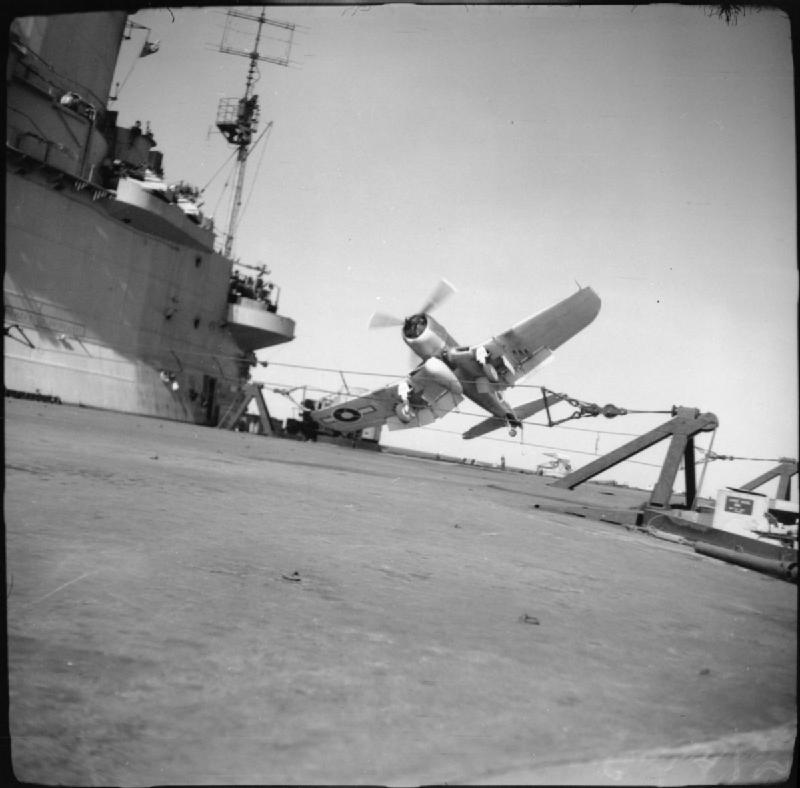
A Corsair has bounced over the aft safety barrier and is about to strike the island, 13 April 1945

Formidable's arrival allowed Rawlings to order Illustrious to the advance base in San Pedro Bay, in the Philippines, for a more thorough inspection. She arrived on 16 April and the examination by divers revealed that some of her outer plating was split and that some transverse frames were cracked. The facilities there could provide only emergency repairs, enough to allow her to reach the bigger dockyard in Sydney. Task Force 57 arrived in San Pedro Bay on 23 April for a more thorough replenishment period and Illustrious transferred aircraft, spares, stores, and newly arrived pilots to the other carriers before sailing for Sydney on 3 May. She arrived on 14 May and departed 10 days later, bound for Rosyth for permanent repairs. 854 Squadron was disembarked while at Sydney, but the carrier kept her two Corsair squadrons until after arriving in the UK on 27 June.

=== Post-war career ===
On 31 July Captain W. D. Stephens relieved Lambe. The end of the war several weeks later meant that there was no longer any urgency in refitting the Illustrious in time to participate in the invasion of the Japanese Home Islands and the Admiralty decided that she would become the Home Fleet training and trials carrier. Her catapult was upgraded to handle heavier aircraft, her flight deck was further improved, and her radar suite was modernized. She began her post-refit trials on 24 June 1946 and flying trials the following month. She relieved Triumph as the trials carrier in August and conducted trials on Firefly FR.4s, Firebrand TF.4s, de Havilland Sea Mosquitoes and de Havilland Sea Vampires over the next several months. Captain Ralph Edwards relieved Stephens on 7 January 1947.

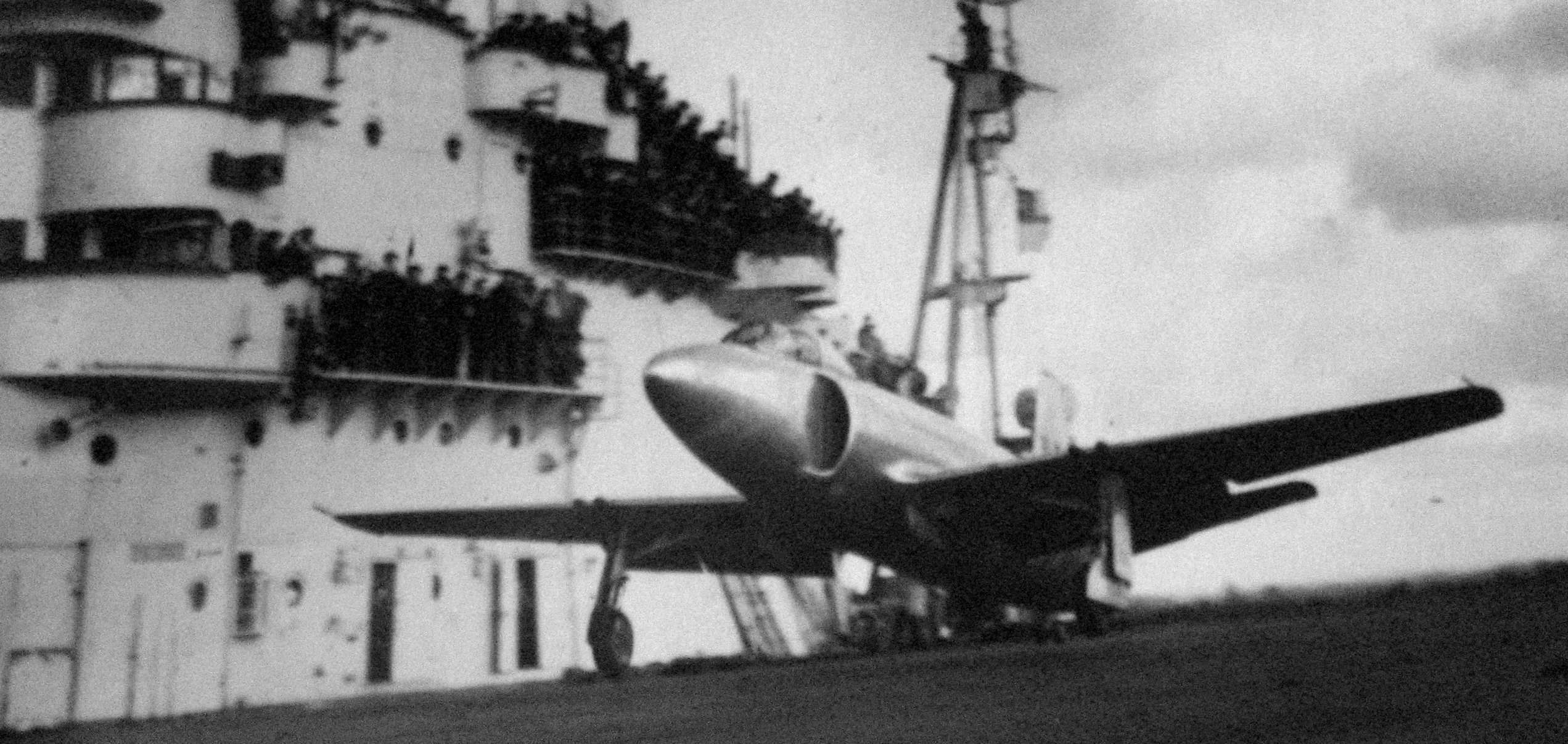
A prototype Supermarine Attacker aboard Illustrious, October 1947

On 1 February, she joined the other ships of the Home Fleet as they rendezvoused with the battleship Vanguard, which was serving as the royal yacht to escort King George VI as he set out for the first royal tour of South Africa. Over the next several months she conducted deck-landing practice for Avenger and Seafire pilots before starting a short refit on 2 April. After the tour's conclusion on 12 May, she sailed for Scottish waters for more deck-landing practice with the destroyer Rocket as her planeguard. On 18 July she rendezvoused with the Home Fleet to participate in manoeuvres before George VI reviewed the fleet on 22–23 July. The King and Queen inspected Illustrious and her crew, as did Prime Minister Clement Attlee and his wife. Afterwards, she was opened for visits by the public before returning to Portsmouth. En route she served as the centrepiece of a convoy-defence exercise as the RAF successfully "attacked" the convoy. After summer leave for her crew, she resumed deck-landing trials in September and October, including the initial trials of the prototype Supermarine Attacker jet-powered fighter in the latter month. In November the government accelerated the demobilisation of some National Servicemen and almost 2,000 men serving in the Mediterranean became eligible for release. They had to be replaced by men from the UK so Illustrious ferried the replacements to Malta, sailing on 21 November and returning on 11 December to Portsmouth.

She was refitted and modernised from January to August 1948. Captain John Hughes-Hallett relieved Edwards on 14 June. The ship was recommissioned in early September. While at anchor in Portland Harbour on 17 October, one of her boats foundered 50 yards (46 m) short of the ship in heavy weather; 29 men lost their lives. For his gallantry during a rescue attempt, Boy 1st Class Alf Lowe was awarded the Albert Medal for Lifesaving.

Illustrious resumed her duties in early 1949 and conducted trials and training for Avengers, Fireflies, Gloster Meteors, de Havilland Sea Hornets, Vampires and Seafires. On 10 June Hughes-Hallet was relieved by Captain Eric Clifford. During a severe gale in late October, the ship aided the small coastal steamer SS Yewpark that had lost power. The weather was too bad for Illustrious to rescue the steamer's crew, but she pumped fuel oil overboard to flatten the seas until a tug arrived to rescue the ship on 27 October. On 2 May 1950, she arrived at Birkenhead to commemorate the launch of the new carrier Ark Royal the following day with the First Lord of the Admiralty, George Hall, 1st Viscount Hall, aboard. A Hawker Sea Fury crashed while landing on 15 May, killing the pilot and two members of the deck crew. The prototype of the turboprop-powered Fairey Gannet anti-submarine aircraft made its first carrier landing aboard on 16 June. This event was also the first landing of any turboprop aircraft aboard an aircraft carrier.

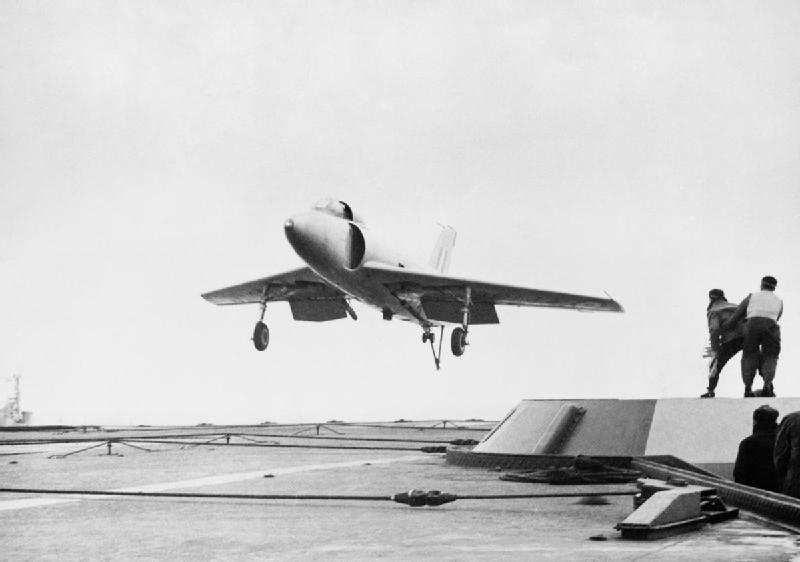
A Supermarine 510 landing aboard, November 1950

Captain S. H. Carlill assumed command on 24 June and the Illustrious resumed deck-landing training. On 8 and 9 November the Supermarine 510 research aircraft made the first ever landings by a swept-wing aircraft aboard a carrier. This aircraft was one of the ancestors of the Supermarine Swift fighter. A month later the ship began a four-month refit and hosted the first carrier landing of the de Havilland Sea Venom on 9 July 1951. Later in the month she hosted the Sea Furies of 802 and the Fireflies of 814 Squadrons for Exercise Winged Fleet. Captain C. T. Jellicoe relieved Carlill on 27 August and the ship ferried 10 Fireflies of 814 Squadron to Malta beginning on 1 October. She exchanged them for Firebrands for the return voyage. On 3 November she began loading the 39th Infantry Brigade of the 3rd Infantry Division in response to the riots in Cyprus that broke out when Egypt abrogated the Anglo-Egyptian treaty of 1936. She set sail two days later and arrived at Famagusta on 11 November. She returned to Portsmouth on 19 November and began loading the 45th Field Regiment, Royal Artillery, the 1st Battalion, Coldstream Guards, and the Bedfordshire and Hertfordshire Regiment two days later. Illustrious set sail on 23 November and reached Famagusta on 29 November. She returned to Portsmouth on 7 December and she did not leave harbour until 30 January 1952 when she resumed her customary role as a training ship.

After a brief refit in early 1952, she participated in Exercise Castanets off the Scottish coast in June and hosted 22,000 visitors during Navy Days at Devonport Royal Dockyard in August. On 1 September she hosted No. 4 Squadron and No. 860 Squadrons, Royal Netherlands Naval Aviation Service (RNNAS) for training, as well as 824 Squadron. Between the three squadrons they had 20 Fireflies and 8 Sea Furies when they participated in the major NATO exercise Main Brace later in the month. Jellicoe was relieved by Captain R. D. Watson on 26 September and Illustrious resumed training until 9 December when her crew was granted leave and the ship began a refit. She next put to sea on 24 April 1953 for trials and did not resume training pilots until the following month. She was reunited with the four other carriers that served with the BPF for the first time since the war for the Coronation Fleet Review of Queen Elizabeth II on 15 June at Spithead. The following day, the Fireflies of No. 4 Squadron, RNNAS and 824 Squadron landed aboard for more deck-landing training. During September she participated in Exercise Mariner with three British squadrons of Fireflies and Sea Furies and a Dutch Squadron of Avengers. The ship resumed flying training off the north coast of Scotland in October for two weeks, but she spent most of the rest of the year on trials of the new mirror-landing system that automated the process of landing aircraft aboard. Illustrious began her final maintenance period at Devonport Royal Dockyard on 10 December. Captain K. A. Short relieved Watson on 28 December. The refit was completed by the end of January 1954 and she resumed her normal role. The ship completed 1,051 deck landings and steamed 4,037 nautical miles (7,477 km; 4,646 mi) by April. She made her first foreign port visit in many years at Le Havre, France, on 20–22 March, where 13,000 people came aboard. After another round of flying operations, she visited Trondheim, Norway, on 19 June. During 12 days of training in September, she completed 950 daytime and nighttime arrested landings and 210 helicopter landings. She conducted her last landings on 3 December and arrived at Devonport four days later to begin decommissioning. Illustrious was paid off at the end of February 1955 and she was towed to Gareloch and placed in reserve. She was sold on 3 November 1956 and broken up in early 1957.

== Squadrons embarked ==
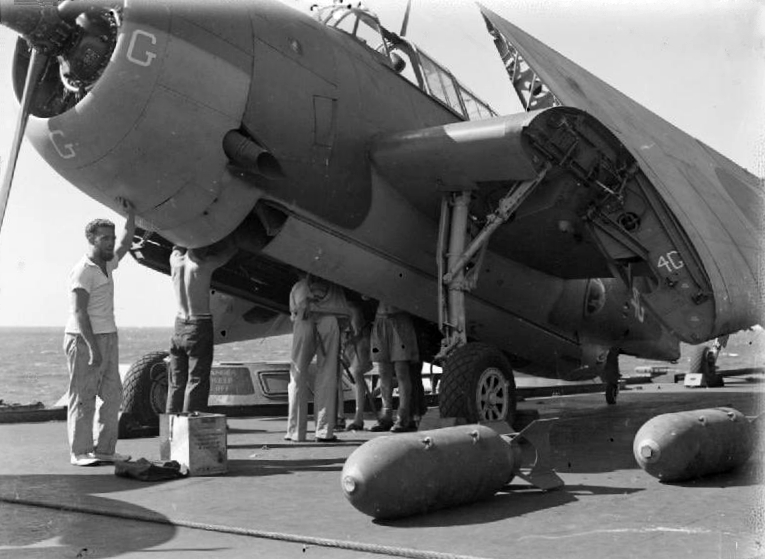
An Avenger being prepared to be "bombed up", May 1944, for the attack on Soerabaya, Java

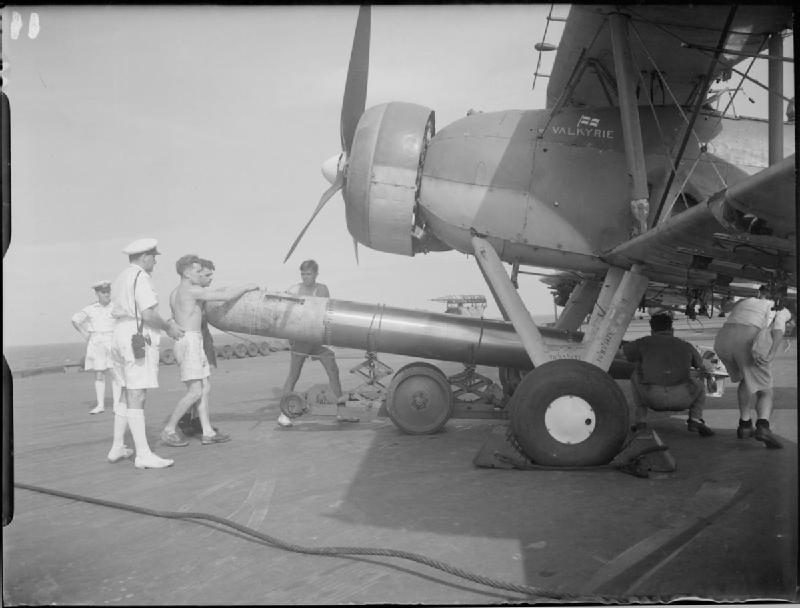
A torpedo being loaded onto a Swordfish

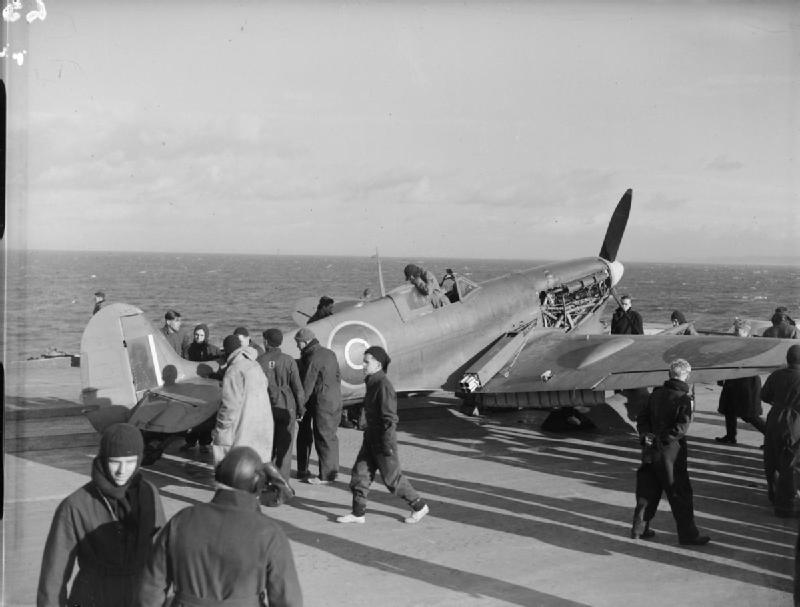
A Seafire being prepared for trials with RATOG boosters

Squadron	Aircraft operated	Embarked (from – to)	Notes
802	Hawker Sea Fury	July – August 1951	–
806	Blackburn Skua; Fairey Fulmar; Grumman F4F Wildcat	11 June 1940 – 11 Jan 1941; 29 May–19 October 1942	–
810	Fairey Swordfish; Fairey Barracuda	2–8 December 1941; 10 March 1942 – 2 November 1944	–
815	Fairey Swordfish; Grumman TBF Avenger	11 June 1940 – 10 January 1941; 17 September – 14 October 1954	–
819	Fairey Swordfish	11 June 1940 – 10 January 1941	Disbanded
829	Fairey Albacore; Fairey Swordfish	2–8 December 1941; 7 March – 21 September 1942	Disbanded
832	Grumman TBF Avenger	3–25 May 1944	–
845	Grumman TBF Avenger	3–27 May 1944	–
847	Fairey Barracuda	28 November 1943 – 18 June 1944	–
854	Grumman TBF Avenger	1 December 1944 – 18 May 1945	–
878	Grumman F4F Wildcat	8 June–18 October 1943	–
881	Grumman F4F Wildcat; Fairey Fulmar	15 March 1942 – 18 February 1943	–
882	Grumman F4F Wildcat	22 March–7 September 1942	Merged into 881 Squadron
890	Grumman F4F Wildcat	14 June–19 October 1942	–
894	Supermarine Seafire II	24 July–24 August 1943; 20 September–18 October 1943	–
1830	Vought F4U Corsair	9 December 1943 – 28 July 1945	Disbanded
1833	Vought F4U Corsair	22 December 1943 – 28 July 1945	Disbanded
1837	Vought F4U Corsair	10 June 1944 – 27 July 1944	Transferred to HMS Victorious

== Bibliography ==
- Brown, David (1971). HMS Illustrious: Aircraft Carrier 1939–1956: Operational History. Warship Profile. Vol. 11. Windsor, UK: Profile Publications. OCLC 33202926.
- Brown, David (1977). WWII Fact Files: Aircraft Carriers. New York: Arco Publishing. ISBN 0-668-04164-1.
- Brown, Eric (May 1983). "Attacker – A Belated Beginning". Air International. 22 (5). Bromley, Kent, UK: The Air International: 233–41. ISSN 0306-5634.
- Brown, J. D. (2009). Carrier Operations in World War II. Annapolis, Maryland: Naval Institute Press. ISBN 978-1-59114-108-2.
- Campbell, John (1985). Naval Weapons of World War II. Annapolis, Maryland: Naval Institute Press. ISBN 0-87021-459-4.
- Cernuschi, Ernesto & O'Hara, Vincent P. (2010). "Taranto: The Raid and the Aftermath". In Jordan, John (ed.). Warship 2010. London: Conway. pp. 77–95. ISBN 978-1-84486-110-1.
- Colledge, J. J.; Warlow, Ben (2006) [1969]. Ships of the Royal Navy: The Complete Record of All Fighting Ships of the Royal Navy from the 15th Century to the Present (3rd Rev ed.). London: Chatham Publishing. ISBN 978-1-86176-281-8. OCLC 67375475.
- Friedman, Norman (1988). British Carrier Aviation: The Evolution of the Ships and Their Aircraft. Annapolis, Maryland: Naval Institute Press. ISBN 0-87021-054-8.
- Gustavsson, Håkan & Slongo, Ludovico (2010). Desert Prelude: "Operation Compass". Sandomierz, Poland: Stratus. ISBN 978-83-61421-18-4.
- Hobbs, David (2013). British Aircraft Carriers: Design, Development and Service Histories. Barnsley, UK: Seaforth Publishing. ISBN 978-1-84832-138-0.
- Hobbs, David (2011). The British Pacific Fleet: The Royal Navy's Most Powerful Strike Force. Annapolis, Maryland: Naval Institute Press. ISBN 978-1-59114-044-3.
- Jackson, A. J. (1968). Blackburn Aircraft Since 1909. London: Putnam. ISBN 0-370-00053-6.
- Jones, Ben, ed. (2018). The Fleet Air Arm in the Second World War. Vol. II, 1942–1943, the Fleet Air Arm in Transition: the Mediterranean, Battle of the Atlantic and the Indian Ocean. London: Routledge. ISBN 978-0-8153-5507-6.
- Lenton, H. T. (1998). British & Empire Warships of the Second World War. Annapolis, Maryland: Naval Institute Press. ISBN 1-55750-048-7.
- Lyon, D. J. (1971). HMS Illustrious: Aircraft Carrier 1939–1956: Technical History. Warship Profile. Vol. 10. Windsor, UK: Profile Publications. OCLC 42677169.
- McCart, Neil (2000). The Illustrious & Implacable Classes of Aircraft Carrier 1940–1969. Cheltenham, UK: Fan Publications. ISBN 1-901225-04-6.
- Rohwer, Jürgen (2005). Chronology of the War at Sea 1939–1945: The Naval History of World War Two (Third Revised ed.). Annapolis, Maryland: Naval Institute Press. ISBN 1-59114-119-2.
- Shores, Christopher (1996). Dust Clouds in the Middle East: The Air War for East Africa, Iraq, Syria and Madagascar, 1940–42. London: Grub Street. ISBN 1-898697-37-X.
- Shores, Christopher; Cull, Brian & Malizia, Nicola (1987a). Air War for Yugoslavia, Greece, and Crete. London: Grub Street. ISBN 0-948817-07-0.
- Shores, Christopher; Cull, Brian & Malizia, Nicola (1987b). Malta: The Hurricane Years: 1940–41. London: Grub Street. ISBN 0-948817-06-2.
- Smith, Peter C. (2008). Dive Bomber!: Aircraft, Technology, and Tactics in World War II. Mechanicsburg, Pennsylvania: Stackpole Books. ISBN 978-0-8117-3454-7.
- Stephen, Martin (1988). Sea Battles in Close-Up: World War 2. Vol. 1. Annapolis, Maryland: Naval Institute Press. ISBN 0-87021-556-6.
- Sturtivant, Ray (1984). The Squadrons of the Fleet Air Arm. Tonbridge, UK: Air-Britain (Historians). ISBN 0-85130-120-7.
- Taylor, H. A. (1974). Fairey Aircraft Since 1915 (1988 ed.). Annapolis, Maryland: Naval Institute Press. ISBN 0-87021-208-7.
- Greene, J.; Massignani, A. (2002) [1998]. The Naval War in the Mediterranean 1940–1943 (pbk. ed.). Rochester: Chatham. ISBN 978-1-86176-190-3.
