= Alf Lowe =

Royal Navy officer (born 1931)

Alfred Lowe
- Born: 14 June 1931 (age 95); London, England
- Military career
- Allegiance: United Kingdom
- Branch: Royal Navy
- Service years: 1947–1959
- Rank: Petty Officer
- Conflicts: Korean War
- Awards: George Cross; Mentioned in Despatches

Alfred Raymond Lowe, GC (born 14 June 1931) is a British recipient of the George Cross. Lowe joined the Royal Navy as a boy seaman in January 1947. After training at HMS Ganges, he joined the crew of the aircraft carrier HMS Illustrious. On 17 October 1948, when aged 17, a boat he was on sank and Lowe risked his life to rescue a drowning midshipman. For his actions in the disaster, which led to 29 deaths, including that of the midshipman, Lowe was awarded the Albert Medal for Lifesaving. Lowe later served as a radio operator and diver and saw action in the Korean War aboard HMS Concord, receiving a mention in despatches. Lowe retired from the navy in 1959 as a petty officer. He later worked as a salesman in England and New Zealand. Lowe took up the offer, made to all living Albert Medal recipients in 1971, to exchange his Albert Medal for the George Cross. He now lives in New Zealand.

== Early life ==
Lowe was born in London on 14 June 1931. From the age of 12 he attended the Watts Naval School, a boarding school operated by the Barnardo's charity, in North Elmham, Norfolk.

== Naval career ==
In January 1947, Lowe joined the Royal Navy as a boy seaman. He attended the HMS Ganges training establishment in Suffolk. Lowe excelled in the seamanship classes and was one of only two boys, out of 2,000 at Ganges, to be appointed boy coxswain.

By early October 1948, Lowe was a boy first class aboard the aircraft carrier HMS Illustrious. The carrier had spent the summer in the English Channel and Western Approaches, carrying out pilot training exercises with NATO allies. On the night of 17 October Lowe was aboard a liberty boat, returning to the ship from Weymouth Pier with 51 sailors who had been on shore leave. The boat was in 8 fathoms (48 ft; 15 m) of water in rough sea conditions and with a strong wind blowing. At 22.45, when the boat was around 50–100 yards (46–91 m) from the stern of Illustrious, it overturned and sank. Lowe was initially trapped under the boats canopy but broke free and swam to a lifebelt that had been thrown from Illustrious. He then removed his overcoat and shoes and swam to the ship, where he grabbed hold of a rope. Lowe heard Midshipman Richard Clough, around 10 yards (9.1 m) away, calling for help and swam to him. Clough had fallen unconscious and Lowe could not keep his head above water; he instead dragged him to the side of the Illustrious. The crew lowered a fog buoy and Lowe placed Clough on top of this. A petty officer climbed down the rope to assist and, having secured Clough, the buoy was lifted aboard. Clough died of shock half an hour later.

The Portland disaster caused the deaths of 29 sailors and was one of the deadliest incidents in the peacetime history of the Royal Navy. Lowe was awarded the Albert Medal for Lifesaving for disregarding his own life and leaving a place of safety to assist Clough.

Lowe continued to serve in the navy and became a radio operator and then a shallow-water diver. He served in Hong Kong and later in the Korean War, aboard HMS Concord. He was not involved in the landings at Inchon but took part in later naval operations there and saw action at Chongjin. On 3 October 1952 he was mentioned in despatches "for distinguished service in operations in Korean waters". Lowe retired from the Royal Navy as a petty officer in July 1959.

== Retirement ==
George Cross

After leaving the navy Lowe attended a sales training course in Manchester and entered that industry. He moved with his family to New Zealand in 1963 and settled at Milford near Auckland, working as a salesman in the flooring and boatbuilding industries. In 1971 it was announced that Albert Medal for Lifesaving would be replaced by the George Cross. Existing recipients could exchange their medal for the George Cross. Lowe took up the offer, received the George Cross, and presented his Albert Medal to HMS Raleigh as an inspiration to naval recruits. Lowe has returned to Portland periodically to attend memorial services for the victims of the 1948 disaster. Lowe is now retired and lives in Bayswater, Auckland.

== Honours and awards ==

Ribbon	Description	Notes
	George Cross	(GC)
	Korea Medal	With mention in dispatches oak leaf
	United Nations Service Medal Korea	
	Queen Elizabeth II Silver Jubilee Medal	
	Queen Elizabeth II Golden Jubilee Medal	
	Queen Elizabeth II Diamond Jubilee Medal	
	Queen Elizabeth II Platinum Jubilee Medal	
	King Charles III Coronation Medal	
	New Zealand 1990 Commemoration Medal	
