= Michael Fell (Royal Navy officer) =

Royal Navy Vice Admiral (1918–1976)

Vice-Admiral Sir Michael Fell KCB DSO DSC & Bar
- Born: 17 January 1918; Calcutta, British India
- Died: 3 December 1976 (aged 58); Stoughton, Chichester, England
- Military career
- Allegiance: United Kingdom
- Branch: Royal Navy
- Service years: 1938–1974
- Rank: Vice-Admiral
- Commands: Naval Air Command; Flag Officer, Carriers; Flag Officer, Gibraltar; HMS Ark Royal; HMS Loch Killisport; RNAS Lossiemouth; HMS Puma; 7th Naval Fighter Wing; 878 Naval Air Squadron; 805 Naval Air Squadron
- Conflicts: Second World War; Korean War
- Awards: Knight Commander of the Order of the Bath; Distinguished Service Order; Distinguished Service Cross & Bar; Mentioned in Despatches (2); King’s Commendation for Valuable Service in the Air

Vice-Admiral Sir Michael Frampton Fell, KCB, DSO, DSC & Bar (17 January 1918 – 3 December 1976) was a Royal Navy officer who served as Flag Officer, Carriers from 1968 to 1970.

== Early life and education ==
Fell was born in Calcutta, British India, the younger son of Herbert Leigh Fell and Winifred Adeline Fell. He was educated at Harrow School.

== Naval career ==
Fell joined the Royal Navy as a midshipman in July 1938. After qualifying as a pilot, he became commanding officer of 805 Naval Air Squadron in the Western Desert in late 1941 during the Second World War. He went on to command 878 Naval Air Squadron in Sicily from early 1943 before becoming air commander on the aircraft carrier HMS Searcher, in which role he led the attacks on the German battleship Tirpitz as part of the Home Fleet Strike force of Operation Tungsten, and then became air commander on the aircraft carrier HMS Emperor.

Fell next served as air commander on the aircraft carrier HMAS Sydney during the Korean War. He went on to be commanding officer of the frigate HMS Puma in 1957, station commander of RNAS Lossiemouth in 1958 and commanding officer of the frigate HMS Loch Killisport in 1961. After that he became chief of staff to the Commander-in-Chief, Portsmouth in 1963, commanding officer of the aircraft carrier HMS Ark Royal in 1965 and Flag Officer, Gibraltar in 1966. His final appointments were as Flag Officer, Carriers in 1968, and as Flag Officer Naval Air Command in 1970 after promotion to vice admiral on 10 June 1970. He was then chief of staff to the Commander Allied Naval Forces Southern Europe from 1972 before retiring in 1974.

== Personal life ==
In 1948, Fell married Elise "Elsie" Joan McLauchlan-Slater.

Fell collapsed and died at the wheel of his car on 3 December 1976, near his home at Stoughton, West Sussex. Lady Fell died on 2 March 2015.

Military offices
Preceded by Derek Empson (as Flag Officer Aircraft Carriers)	Flag Officer Carriers and Amphibious Ships; 1968–1970	Succeeded by John Treacher
Preceded by Sir Richard Janvrin	Flag Officer Naval Air Command; 1970–1972	Succeeded by John Treacher
