= 878 Naval Air Squadron =

Inactive flying squadron of the Royal Navy's Fleet Air Arm

- Squadron badge
- Active: 1943–1944
- Disbanded: 25 January 1944
- Country: United Kingdom
- Branch: Royal Navy
- Type: Single-seat fighter squadron
- Role: Fleet fighter squadron
- Size: Twelve aircraft
- Part of: Fleet Air Arm
- Home station: See Naval air stations section for full list.
- Mottos: Feles non pusilla (Latin for 'A cat - but no weakling')
- Engagements: World War II: Operation Avalanche
- Battle honours: Salerno 1943

Commanders
- Notable commanders: Lieutenant Commander(A) M.F. Fell, RN

Insignia
- Squadron badge description: Black, the face of a wildcat white fimbriated red (1943)
- Identification Markings: single letters

Aircraft flown
- Fighter: Grumman Martlet

878 Naval Air Squadron (878 NAS), sometimes called 878 Squadron, is an inactive Fleet Air Arm (FAA) naval air squadron of the United Kingdom’s Royal Navy (RN). It was briefly active during the Second World War and operated with Grumman Wildcat fighters. It disbanded at HMS Gannet, RNAS Eglinton, Northern Ireland, in January 1944, with its aircraft being transferred to 816 and 1832 Naval Air Squadrons.

Established in March 1943 as a fleet fighter squadron, it conducted its initial training at HMS Sparrowhawk, RNAS Hatston on Mainland, Orkney, prior to boarding HMS Illustrious in June. The squadron operated from the aircraft carrier off the coast of Iceland before delivering air support during the Salerno campaign in Italy.

== History ==
=== Fleet fighter squadron (1943–1944) ===
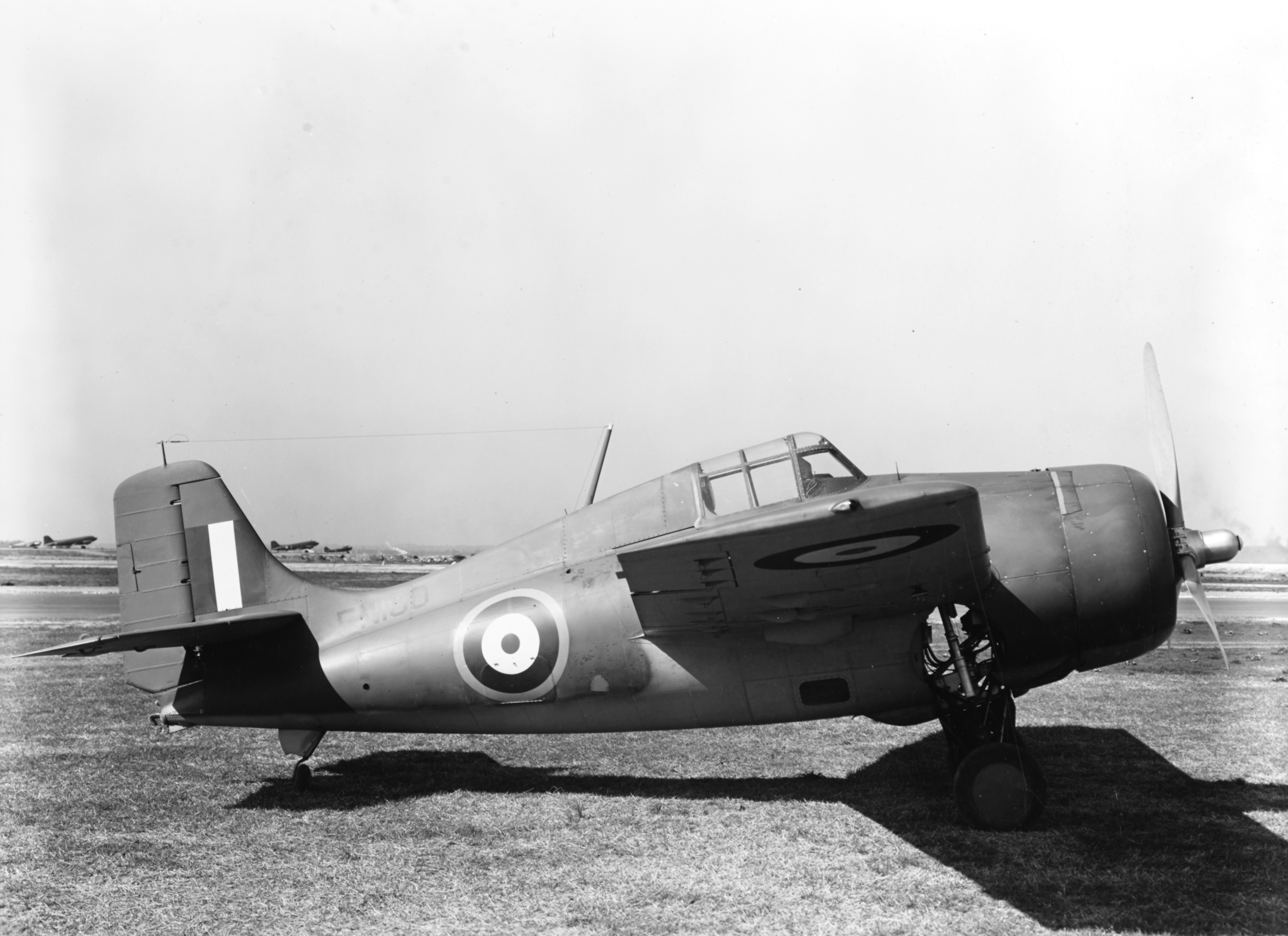
Grumman Martlet Mk IV, as used by 878 NAS

878 Naval Air Squadron formed at RNAS Lee-on-Solent (HMS Daedalus), Hampshire, on 1 March 1943, Lieutenant Commander(A) M.F. Fell, RN, commanding. Its role was as a Fleet Fighter squadron and it was equipped with twelve Grumman Martlet Mk IV, an American carrier-based fighter aircraft.

Following a period of training at RNAS Hatston (HMS Sparrowhawk), in Orkney, in Scotland, the squadron boarded the lead ship of her class, HMS Illustrious on 8 June and commenced operations in the Icelandic region the subsequent month. In August 1943, the aircraft carrier proceeded to the Mediterranean, where 878 Naval Air Squadron engaged in combat over the Salerno beachhead.

In October 1943, while stationed at RAF Port Ellen, on the island of Islay in Argyll and Bute, the squadron transitioned to ten Grumman Martlet Mk V fighter aircraft, which were subsequently distributed between 816 and 1832 Naval Air Squadrons upon the disbandment of 878 Naval Air Squadron, at RNAS Eglinton (HMS Gannet), in County Londonderry, Northern Ireland, on 25 January 1944.

== Aircraft operated ==
The squadron has operated different variants of only one aircraft type:

- Grumman Martlet Mk IV fighter aircraft (March - October 1943)
- Grumman Wildcat Mk V fighter aircraft (October 1943 - January 1944)

== Battle honours ==
The battle honours awarded to 878 Naval Air Squadron are:

- Salerno 1943

== Naval air stations and aircraft carriers ==
878 Naval Air Squadron operated from a number of naval air stations of the Royal Navy, and a Royal Air Force station in the UK and also a Royal Navy fleet carrier:

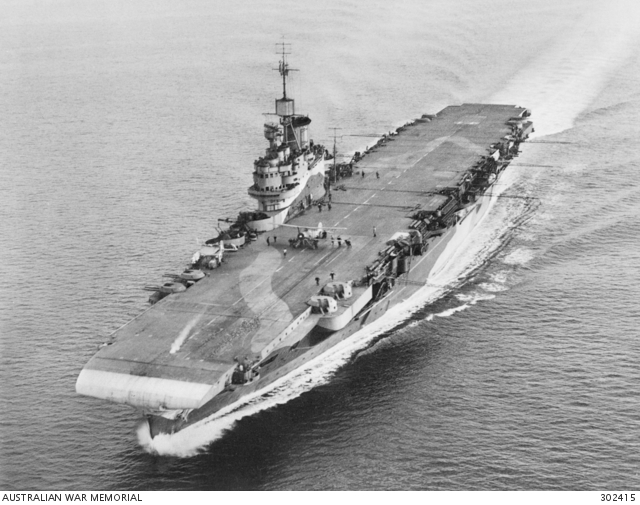
HMS Illustrious

- Royal Naval Air Station Lee-on-Solent (HMS Daedalus), Hampshire, (1 March - 10 April 1943)
- Royal Naval Air Station Hatston (HMS Sparrowhawk), Mainland, Orkney, (10 April - 8 June 1943)
- Royal Naval Air Station Machrihanish (HMS Landrail), Argyll and Bute, (8 - 15 June 1943)
- HMS Illustrious (15 June - 19 October 1943)
- Royal Air Force Port Ellen, Argyll and Bute, (19 October - 13 December 1943)
- Royal Naval Air Station Eglinton (HMS Gannet), County Londonderry, (13 December 1943 - 25 January 1944)
- disbanded into 1832 Naval Air Squadron (25 January 1944)

== Commanding officers ==
List of commanding officers of 878 Naval Air Squadron:

- Lieutenant Commander(A) M.F. Fell, RN, from 1 March 1943
- Lieutenant Commander(A) D.K. Evans, RNZNVR, from 30 October 1943
- disbanded - 25 January 1944

Note: Abbreviation (A) signifies Air Branch of the RN or RNVR.
