= List of lords commissioners of the Admiralty =

This is a list of lords commissioners of the Admiralty (incomplete before the Restoration, 1660).

The lords commissioners of the Admiralty were the members of the Board of Admiralty, which exercised the office of Lord High Admiral when it was not vested in a single person. The commissioners were a mixture of politicians without naval experience and professional naval officers, the proportion of naval officers generally increasing over time. In 1940, the Secretary of the Admiralty, a civil servant, became a member of the Board. The Lord High Admiral, and thus the Board of Admiralty, ceased to have operational command of the Royal Navy when the three service ministries were merged into the Ministry of Defence in 1964, when the office of Lord High Admiral reverted to the Crown.

== 1628 to 1641 ==
- 20 September 1628: Commission.
  - Richard Weston, 1st Baron Weston (Lord High Treasurer), First Lord
  - Robert Bertie, 1st Earl of Lindsey (Lord Great Chamberlain)
  - Edward Sackville, 4th Earl of Dorset (Lord Chamberlain to the Queen)
  - Francis Cottington, 1st Baron Cottington (Chancellor of the Exchequer)
  - Sir Henry Vane (Comptroller of the Household)
  - Sir John Coke (Secretary of State)
  - Sir Francis Windebank (Secretary of State)
- 10 April 1635: Commission.
  - Robert Bertie, 1st Earl of Lindsey (Lord Great Chamberlain), First Lord
  - others
- 16 March 1636: Commission
  - William Juxon (Lord High Treasurer), First Lord
  - others
- 13 April 1638: Algernon Percy, 10th Earl of Northumberland, Lord High Admiral

== 1641 to 1661 ==
From the appointment of Warwick until 1660, appointments during this period were made by Parliament or a part thereof.

- 7 December 1643: Robert Rich, 2nd Earl of Warwick, Lord High Admiral
- 15 April 1645: Commission (by the Committee of Both Houses).
  - Robert Devereux, 3rd Earl of Essex
  - Robert Rich, 2nd Earl of Warwick
  - William Fiennes, 1st Viscount Saye and Sele
  - Dudley North, 3rd Baron North
  - William Earle
  - Philip Stapleton
  - John Evelyn Jr.
  - Christopher Wray, MP
  - John Rolle
  - Giles Grene
  - D. Hollis
  - John Selden, MP
  - F. Rouse
  - Thomas Eden, MP
  - T. Lisle
  - Bulstrode Whitelocke, MP
- 28 April 1645: Commission (by the House of Commons)
  - Robert Rich, 2nd Earl of Warwick
  - Alexander Bence
  - Squire Bence
  - H. Pelham
- 12 February 1649: Commission (by the House of Commons)
  - _ Dean
  - Francis Popham
  - Colonel Robert Blake
- 23 February 1649: Powers transferred to the Council of State
- 3 December 1653:
  - General Robert Blake
  - General George Monck
  - Major-General John Desborow
  - Vice-Admiral William Penn
  - Colonel Philip Jones
  - Colonel John Clerk
  - John Stone
  - Major William Burton
  - Vincent Gooking
  - Lieutenant-Colonel Kelsey
- November 1655: During the Protectorate (CSPD, IX, 10)
  - John Lambert
  - William Sydenham
  - John Desborough
  - Philipp Jones
  - Thomas Kelsey
  - Edward Salmon
  - Edward Montague
  - General George Monck
  - General Robert Blake
  - John Clerke
  - Governor Edward Hopkins

== 1661 to 1681 ==
- 29 January 1661: James, Duke of York and Albany, Lord High Admiral
- 9 July 1673: Commission.
  - Prince Rupert of the Rhine
  - Anthony Ashley-Cooper, 1st Earl of Shaftesbury (ex officio as Lord Chancellor)
  - Thomas, 1st Viscount Osborne (ex officio as Lord High Treasurer)
  - Arthur Annesley, 1st Earl of Anglesey (ex officio as Lord Privy Seal)
  - George Villiers, 2nd Duke of Buckingham
  - James Scott, 1st Duke of Monmouth
  - John Maitland, 1st Duke of Lauderdale
  - James Butler, 1st Duke of Ormonde
  - Henry Bennet, 1st Earl of Arlington (ex officio as Secretary of State for the Southern Department)
  - Sir George Carteret, 1st Baronet (ex officio as Vice-Chamberlain of the Household)
  - Henry Coventry (ex officio as Secretary of State for the Northern Department)
  - Edward Seymour (ex officio as Treasurer of the Navy)
- 31 October 1674: Commission.
  - Prince Rupert
  - Heneage Finch, 1st Baron Finch (ex officio as Lord Keeper)
  - Thomas Osborne, 1st Earl of Danby (ex officio as Lord High Treasurer)
  - Arthur Annesley, 1st Earl of Anglesey (ex officio as Lord Privy Seal)
  - George Villiers, 2nd Duke of Buckingham
  - James Scott, 1st Duke of Monmouth
  - John Maitland, 1st Duke of Lauderdale
  - James Butler, 1st Duke of Ormonde
  - Henry Bennet, 1st Earl of Arlington
  - Sir George Carteret, 1st Baronet (ex officio as Vice-Chamberlain of the Household)
  - Henry Coventry (ex officio as Secretary of State for the Southern Department)
  - Sir Joseph Williamson (ex officio as Secretary of State for the Northern Department)
  - Edward Seymour (ex officio as Treasurer of the Navy)
- 26 September 1677: Commission.
  - Prince Rupert
  - Heneage Finch, 1st Baron Finch (ex officio as Lord Chancellor)
  - Thomas Osborne, 1st Earl of Danby (ex officio as Lord High Treasurer)
  - Arthur Annesley, 1st Earl of Anglesey (ex officio as Lord Privy Seal)
  - James Scott, 1st Duke of Monmouth
  - John Maitland, 1st Duke of Lauderdale
  - James Butler, 1st Duke of Ormonde
  - Thomas Butler, Earl of Ossory
  - Henry Bennet, 1st Earl of Arlington
  - Sir George Carteret, 1st Baronet (ex officio as Vice-Chamberlain of the Household)
  - Henry Coventry (ex officio as Secretary of State for the Southern Department)
  - Sir Joseph Williamson (ex officio as Secretary of State for the Northern Department)
  - Sir John Ernle
  - Sir Thomas Chicheley
  - Edward Seymour (ex officio as Treasurer of the Navy)
- 14 May 1679: Commission.
  - Sir Henry Capell, First Lord
  - Daniel Finch
  - Sir Thomas Lee, 1st Baronet
  - Sir Humphrey Winch, 1st Baronet
  - Sir Thomas Meres
  - Edward Vaughan
  - Edward Hales

== 1681 to 1701 ==
- 19 February 1681: Commission.
  - Daniel Finch, 2nd Earl of Nottingham, First Lord
  - Sir Humphrey Winch, 1st Baronet
  - Sir Thomas Meres
  - Edward Hales
  - William Brouncker, 2nd Viscount Brouncker
  - Sir Thomas Littleton, 2nd Baronet
- 20 January 1682: Commission.
  - Daniel Finch, 2nd Earl of Nottingham, First Lord
  - Sir Humphrey Winch, 1st Baronet
  - Sir Thomas Meres
  - Edward Hales
  - William Brouncker, 2nd Viscount Brouncker
  - Henry Savile
  - Sir John Chicheley, Naval Lord
- 22 August 1683: Commission.
  - Daniel Finch, 2nd Earl of Nottingham, First Lord
  - Sir Humphrey Winch, 1st Baronet
  - Sir Thomas Meres
  - Edward Hales
  - William Brouncker, 2nd Viscount Brouncker
  - Henry Savile
  - Sir John Chicheley, Naval Lord
  - Arthur Herbert, Naval Lord (supernumerary)
- 17 April 1684: Commission.
  - Daniel Finch, 2nd Earl of Nottingham, First Lord
  - Sir Humphrey Winch, 1st Baronet
  - Sir Thomas Meres
  - Sir Edward Hales, 3rd Baronet
  - Henry Savile
  - Sir John Chicheley, Naval Lord
  - Arthur Herbert, Naval Lord
  - John Vaughan, Baron Vaughan (supernumerary)
- 19 May 1684: King Charles II
- 6 February 1685: King James II
- 13 February 1689: King William III
- 8 March 1689: Commission.
  - Arthur Herbert, First Lord and Senior Naval Lord
  - John Vaughan, 3rd Earl of Carbery
  - Sir Michael Warton
  - Sir Thomas Lee, 1st Baronet
  - Sir John Chicheley, Naval Lord
  - Sir John Lowther, 2nd Baronet
  - William Sacheverell
- 20 January 1690: Commission.
  - Thomas Herbert, 8th Earl of Pembroke, First Lord
  - John Vaughan, 3rd Earl of Carbery
  - Sir Thomas Lee, 1st Baronet
  - Sir John Lowther, 2nd Baronet
  - Sir John Chicheley, Senior Naval Lord
- 5 June 1690: Commission.
  - Thomas Herbert, 8th Earl of Pembroke, First Lord
  - John Vaughan, 3rd Earl of Carbery
  - Sir Thomas Lee, 1st Baronet
  - Sir John Lowther, 2nd Baronet
  - Edward Russell, Senior Naval Lord
  - Sir Richard Onslow, 2nd Baronet
  - Henry Priestman, Naval Lord
- 23 January 1691: Commission.
  - Thomas Herbert, 8th Earl of Pembroke, First Lord
  - Sir Thomas Lee, 1st Baronet
  - Sir John Lowther, 2nd Baronet
  - Sir Richard Onslow, 2nd Baronet
  - Henry Priestman, Senior Naval Lord
  - Anthony Carey, 5th Viscount Falkland
  - Robert Austen
- 16 November 1691: Commission.
  - Thomas Herbert, 8th Earl of Pembroke, First Lord
  - Sir John Lowther, 2nd Baronet
  - Sir Richard Onslow, 2nd Baronet
  - Henry Priestman, Senior Naval Lord
  - Anthony Carey, 5th Viscount Falkland
  - Robert Austen
  - Sir Robert Rich, 2nd Baronet
- 10 March 1692: Commission.
  - Charles Cornwallis, 3rd Baron Cornwallis, First Lord
  - Sir John Lowther, 2nd Baronet
  - Sir Richard Onslow, 2nd Baronet
  - Henry Priestman, Senior Naval Lord
  - Anthony Carey, 5th Viscount Falkland
  - Robert Austen
  - Sir Robert Rich, 2nd Baronet
- 15 April 1693: Commission.
  - Anthony Carey, 5th Viscount Falkland, First Lord
  - Sir John Lowther, 2nd Baronet
  - Henry Priestman, Senior Naval Lord
  - Robert Austen
  - Sir Robert Rich, 2nd Baronet
  - Henry Killigrew, Naval Lord
  - Sir Ralph Delaval, Naval Lord
- 2 May 1694: Commission.
  - Edward Russell, First Lord and Senior Naval Lord
  - Sir John Lowther, 2nd Baronet
  - Henry Priestman, Naval Lord
  - Robert Austen
  - Sir Robert Rich, 2nd Baronet
  - Sir George Rooke, Naval Lord
  - Sir John Houblon
- 24 February 1696: Commission.
  - Edward Russell, First Lord and Senior Naval Lord
  - Henry Priestman, Naval Lord
  - Robert Austen
  - Sir Robert Rich, 2nd Baronet
  - Sir George Rooke, Naval Lord
  - Sir John Houblon
  - James Kendall
- 5 June 1697: Commission.
  - Edward Russell, 1st Earl of Orford, First Lord and Senior Naval Lord
  - Henry Priestman, Naval Lord
  - Sir Robert Rich, 2nd Baronet
  - Sir George Rooke, Naval Lord
  - Sir John Houblon
  - James Kendall
  - Goodwin Wharton
- 31 May 1699: Commission.
  - John Egerton, 3rd Earl of Bridgewater, First Lord
  - John Thompson, 1st Baron Haversham
  - Sir Robert Rich, 2nd Baronet
  - Sir George Rooke, Senior Naval Lord
  - Sir David Mitchell, Naval Lord
- 28 October 1699: Commission.
  - John Egerton, 3rd Earl of Bridgewater, First Lord
  - [ohn Thompson, 1st Baron Haversham
  - Sir George Rooke, Senior Naval Lord
  - Sir David Mitchell, Naval Lord
  - George Churchill, Naval Lord

== 1701 to 1721 ==
- 4 April 1701: Commission.
  - Thomas Herbert, 8th Earl of Pembroke, First Lord
  - John Thompson, 1st Baron Haversham
  - Sir George Rooke, Senior Naval Lord
  - Sir David Mitchell, Naval Lord
  - George Churchill, Naval Lord
- 26 January 1702: Thomas Herbert, 8th Earl of Pembroke, Lord High Admiral
- 20 May 1702: Prince George, Lord High Admiral
  - Council of the Lord High Admiral, 22 May 1702:
    - Sir George Rooke Senior Member
    - Sir David Mitchell
    - George Churchill
    - Richard Hill
  - Council of the Lord High Admiral, 29 March 1703:
    - Sir George Rooke Senior Member
    - Sir David Mitchell
    - George Churchill
    - Richard Hill
    - James Brydges
  - Council of the Lord High Admiral, 30 April 1704:
    - Sir George Rooke Senior Member
    - Sir David Mitchell
    - George Churchill
    - Richard Hill
    - James Brydges
    - Henry Paget
  - Council of the Lord High Admiral, 26 December 1704:
    - Sir George Rooke Senior Member
    - Sir David Mitchell
    - George Churchill
    - Richard Hill
    - James Brydges
    - Henry Paget
    - Sir Cloudesley Shovell
  - Council of the Lord High Admiral, 11 June 1705:
    - Sir David Mitchell Senior Member
    - George Churchill
    - Richard Hill
    - Henry Paget
    - Sir Cloudesley Shovell
    - Robert Walpole
  - Council of the Lord High Admiral, 8 February 1706:
    - Sir David Mitchell Senior Member
    - George Churchill
    - Richard Hill
    - Henry Paget
    - Sir Cloudesley Shovell
    - Robert Walpole
    - Sir Stafford Fairborne
- 28 June 1707: Prince George, Lord High Admiral (reappointed as Lord High Admiral of Great Britain following the Union with Scotland)
  - Council of the Lord High Admiral, 28 June 1707
    - Sir David Mitchell Senior Member
    - George Churchill
    - Richard Hill
    - Henry Paget
    - Sir Cloudesley Shovell
    - Robert Walpole
    - Sir Stafford Fairborne
  - Council of the Lord High Admiral, 19 April 1708:
    - David Wemyss, 4th Earl of Wemyss Senior Member
    - George Churchill
    - Richard Hill
    - Henry Paget
    - Sir Stafford Fairborne
    - Sir John Leake
  - Council of the Lord High Admiral, 20 June 1708:
    - David Wemyss, 4th Earl of Wemyss Senior Member
    - George Churchill
    - Richard Hill
    - Henry Paget
    - Sir John Leake
    - Sir James Wishart
    - Robert Fairfax
- 28 October 1708: Queen Anne, Lord High Admiral
- 29 November 1708: Thomas Herbert, 8th Earl of Pembroke, Lord High Admiral, Senior Member
- 8 November 1709: Commission.
  - Edward Russell, 1st Earl of Orford, First Lord
  - Sir John Leake, Senior Naval Lord
  - Sir George Byng, Naval Lord
  - George Dodington
  - Paul Methuen
- 4 October 1710: Commission.
  - Sir John Leake, Naval Lord (not called "First Lord")
  - Sir George Byng, Senior Naval Lord
  - George Dodington
  - Paul Methuen
  - Sir William Drake, 4th Baronet
  - John Aislabie
- 20 December 1710: Commission.
  - Sir John Leake, Naval Lord
  - Sir George Byng, Senior Naval Lord
  - Sir William Drake, 4th Baronet
  - John Aislabie
  - Sir James Wishart, Naval Lord
  - George Clarke
- 30 September 1712: Commission.
  - Thomas Wentworth, 1st Earl of Strafford, First Lord
  - Sir John Leake, Senior Naval Lord
  - Sir George Byng, Naval Lord
  - Sir William Drake, 4th Baronet
  - John Aislabie
  - Sir James Wishart, Naval Lord
  - George Clarke
- 19 January 1714: Commission.
  - Thomas Wentworth, 1st Earl of Strafford, First Lord
  - Sir John Leake, Senior Naval Lord
  - Sir William Drake, 4th Baronet
  - John Aislabie
  - Sir James Wishart, Naval Lord
  - George Clarke
- 9 April 1714: Commission.
  - Thomas Wentworth, 1st Earl of Strafford, First Lord
  - Sir John Leake, Senior Naval Lord
  - Sir William Drake, 4th Baronet
  - Sir James Wishart, Naval Lord
  - George Clarke
  - Sir George Beaumont, 4th Baronet
- 14 October 1714: Commission.
  - Edward Russell, 1st Earl of Orford, First Lord
  - Sir George Byng, Senior Naval Lord
  - George Dodington
  - Sir John Jennings, Naval Lord
  - Sir Charles Turner, 1st Baronet
  - Abraham Stanyan
  - George Baillie
- 16 April 1717: Commission.
  - James Berkeley, 3rd Earl of Berkeley, First Lord
  - Matthew Aylmer, Senior Naval Lord
  - Sir George Byng, Naval Lord
  - John Cockburn
  - William Richard Chetwynd
- 19 March 1718: Commission.
  - James Berkeley, 3rd Earl of Berkeley, First Lord
  - Sir George Byng, Senior Naval Lord
  - Sir John Jennings, Naval Lord
  - John Cockburn
  - William Richard Chetwynd
  - Sir John Norris, Naval Lord
  - Sir Charles Wager, Naval Lord

== 1721 to 1741 ==
- 30 September 1721: Commission.
  - James Berkeley, 3rd Earl of Berkeley, First Lord
  - Sir John Jennings, Senior Naval Lord
  - John Cockburn
  - William Richard Chetwynd
  - Sir John Norris, Naval Lord
  - Sir Charles Wager, Naval Lord
  - Daniel Pulteney
- 3 June 1725: Commission.
  - James Berkeley, 3rd Earl of Berkeley, First Lord
  - Sir John Jennings, Senior Naval Lord
  - John Cockburn
  - William Richard Chetwynd
  - Sir John Norris, Naval Lord
  - Sir Charles Wager, Naval Lord
  - Sir George Oxenden, 5th Baronet
- 1 June 1727: Commission.
  - James Berkeley, 3rd Earl of Berkeley, First Lord
  - John Cockburn
  - William Richard Chetwynd
  - Sir John Norris, Senior Naval Lord
  - Sir Charles Wager, Naval Lord
  - Sir George Oxenden, 5th Baronet
  - Sir Thomas Lyttelton, 4th Baronet
- 2 August 1727: Commission.
  - George Byng, 1st Viscount Torrington, First Lord
  - John Cockburn
  - Sir John Norris, Senior Naval Lord
  - Sir Charles Wager, Naval Lord
  - Sir Thomas Lyttelton, 4th Baronet
  - George Cholmondeley, Viscount Malpas
  - Samuel Molyneux
- 1 June 1728: Commission.
  - George Byng, 1st Viscount Torrington, First Lord
  - John Cockburn
  - Sir John Norris, Senior Naval Lord
  - Sir Charles Wager, Naval Lord
  - Sir Thomas Lyttelton, 4th Baronet
  - George Cholmondeley, Viscount Malpas
  - Sir William Yonge, 4th Baronet
- 19 May 1729: Commission.
  - George Byng, 1st Viscount Torrington, First Lord
  - John Cockburn
  - Sir John Norris, Senior Naval Lord
  - Sir Charles Wager, Naval Lord
  - Sir Thomas Lyttelton, 4th Baronet
  - Sir William Yonge, 4th Baronet
  - Lord Archibald Hamilton, Naval Lord
- 13 May 1730: Commission.
  - George Byng, 1st Viscount Torrington, First Lord
  - John Cockburn
  - Sir Charles Wager, Senior Naval Lord
  - Sir Thomas Lyttelton, 4th Baronet
  - Lord Archibald Hamilton, Naval Lord
  - Sir Thomas Frankland, 3rd Baronet
  - Thomas Winnington
- 15 June 1732: Commission.
  - George Byng, 1st Viscount Torrington, First Lord
  - Sir Charles Wager, Senior Naval Lord
  - Sir Thomas Lyttelton, 4th Baronet
  - Lord Archibald Hamilton, Naval Lord
  - Sir Thomas Frankland, 3rd Baronet
  - Thomas Winnington
  - Thomas Clutterbuck
- 21 June 1733: Commission.
  - Sir Charles Wager, First Lord
  - Sir Thomas Lyttelton, 4th Baronet
  - Lord Archibald Hamilton, Senior Naval Lord
  - Sir Thomas Frankland, 3rd Baronet
  - Thomas Winnington
  - Thomas Clutterbuck
  - Lord Harry Powlett, Naval Lord
- 22 May 1736: Commission.
  - Sir Charles Wager, First Lord
  - Sir Thomas Lyttelton, 4th Baronet
  - Lord Archibald Hamilton, Senior Naval Lord
  - Sir Thomas Frankland, 3rd Baronet
  - Thomas Clutterbuck
  - Lord Harry Powlett, Naval Lord
  - John Campbell
- 13 March 1738: Commission.
  - Sir Charles Wager, First Lord
  - Sir Thomas Lyttelton, 4th Baronet
  - Sir Thomas Frankland, 3rd Baronet
  - Thomas Clutterbuck
  - Lord Harry Powlett, Senior Naval Lord
  - John Campbell
  - Lord Vere Beauclerk, Naval Lord

== 1741 to 1761 ==
- 5 May 1741: Commission.
  - Sir Charles Wager, First Lord
  - Sir Thomas Frankland, 3rd Baronet
  - Lord Harry Powlett, Senior Naval Lord
  - John Campbell
  - Lord Vere Beauclerk, Naval Lord
  - John Campbell, Lord Glenorchy
  - Edward Thompson
- 19 March 1742: Commission.
  - Daniel Finch, 8th Earl of Winchilsea, First Lord
  - John Cockburn
  - Lord Archibald Hamilton, Senior Naval Lord
  - Charles Calvert, 5th Baron Baltimore
  - Philip Cavendish, Naval Lord
  - George Lee
  - John Trevor
- 13 December 1743: Commission.
  - Daniel Finch, 8th Earl of Winchilsea, First Lord
  - John Cockburn
  - Lord Archibald Hamilton, Senior Naval Lord
  - Charles Calvert, 5th Baron Baltimore
  - George Lee
  - Sir Charles Hardy, Naval Lord
  - John Phillipson
- 27 December 1744: Commission.
  - John Russell, 4th Duke of Bedford, First Lord
  - John Montagu, 4th Earl of Sandwich
  - Lord Archibald Hamilton, Senior Naval Lord
  - Lord Vere Beauclerk, Naval Lord
  - Charles Calvert, 5th Baron Baltimore
  - George Anson, Naval Lord
  - George Grenville
- 25 April 1745: Commission.
  - John Russell, 4th Duke of Bedford, First Lord
  - John Montagu, 4th Earl of Sandwich
  - Lord Archibald Hamilton, Senior Naval Lord
  - Lord Vere Beauclerk, Naval Lord
  - George Anson, Naval Lord
  - George Grenville
  - Henry Legge
- 25 February 1746: Commission.
  - John Russell, 4th Duke of Bedford, First Lord
  - John Montagu, 4th Earl of Sandwich
  - Lord Vere Beauclerk, Senior Naval Lord
  - George Anson, Naval Lord
  - George Grenville
  - Henry Legge
  - William Wildman Barrington, 2nd Viscount Barrington
- 27 June 1746: Commission.
  - John Russell, 4th Duke of Bedford, First Lord
  - John Montagu, 4th Earl of Sandwich
  - Lord Vere Beauclerk, Senior Naval Lord
  - George Anson, Naval Lord
  - George Grenville
  - William Wildman Barrington, 2nd Viscount Barrington
  - William Ponsonby, Viscount Duncannon
- 23 June 1747: Commission.
  - John Russell, 4th Duke of Bedford, First Lord
  - John Montagu, 4th Earl of Sandwich
  - Lord Vere Beauclerk, Senior Naval Lord
  - George Anson, Naval Lord
  - William Wildman Barrington, 2nd Viscount Barrington
  - William Ponsonby, Viscount Duncannon
  - Welbore Ellis
- 26 February 1748: Commission.
  - John Montagu, 4th Earl of Sandwich, First Lord
  - Lord Vere Beauclerk, Senior Naval Lord
  - George Anson, 1st Baron Anson, Naval Lord
  - William Wildman Barrington, 2nd Viscount Barrington
  - William Ponsonby, Viscount Duncannon
  - Welbore Ellis
  - John Stanhope
- 24 December 1748: Commission.
  - John Montagu, 4th Earl of Sandwich, First Lord
  - Lord Vere Beauclerk, Senior Naval Lord
  - William Wildman Barrington, 2nd Viscount Barrington
  - William Ponsonby, Viscount Duncannon
  - Welbore Ellis
  - Thomas Villiers
- 18 November 1749: Commission.
  - John Montagu, 4th Earl of Sandwich, First Lord
  - George Anson, 1st Baron Anson, Senior Naval Lord
  - William Wildman Barrington, 2nd Viscount Barrington
  - William Ponsonby, Viscount Duncannon
  - Welbore Ellis
  - Thomas Villiers
  - Granville Leveson-Gower, Viscount Trentham
- 22 June 1751: Commission.
  - George Anson, 1st Baron Anson, First Lord
  - William Wildman Barrington, 2nd Viscount Barrington
  - William Ponsonby, Viscount Duncannon
  - Welbore Ellis
  - Thomas Villiers
  - William Rowley, Senior Naval Lord
  - Edward Boscawen, Naval Lord
- 9 April 1754: Commission.
  - George Anson, 1st Baron Anson, First Lord
  - William Ponsonby, Viscount Duncannon
  - Welbore Ellis
  - Thomas Villiers
  - Sir William Rowley, Senior Naval Lord
  - Edward Boscawen, Naval Lord
  - Charles Townshend
- 29 December 1755: Commission.
  - George Anson, 1st Baron Anson, First Lord
  - William Ponsonby, Viscount Duncannon
  - Thomas Villiers
  - Sir William Rowley, Senior Naval Lord
  - Edward Boscawen, Naval Lord
  - John Bateman, 2nd Viscount Bateman
  - Richard Edgcumbe
- 17 November 1756: Commission.
  - Richard Grenville-Temple, 2nd Earl Temple, First Lord
  - Edward Boscawen, Senior Naval Lord
  - Temple West, Naval Lord
  - John Pitt
  - George Hay
  - Thomas Orby Hunter
  - Gilbert Elliot
- 13 December 1756: Commission.
  - Richard Grenville-Temple, 2nd Earl Temple, First Lord
  - Edward Boscawen, Senior Naval Lord
  - Temple West, Naval Lord
  - George Hay
  - Thomas Orby Hunter
  - Gilbert Elliot
  - John Forbes, Naval Lord
- 6 April 1757: Commission.
  - Daniel Finch, 8th Earl of Winchilsea, First Lord
  - Sir William Rowley, Senior Naval Lord
  - Edward Boscawen, Naval Lord
  - Gilbert Elliot
  - John Proby, 1st Baron Carysfort
  - Savage Mostyn, Naval Lord
  - Edwin Sandys
- 2 July 1757: Commission.
  - George Anson, 1st Baron Anson, First Lord
  - Edward Boscawen, Senior Naval Lord
  - Temple West, Naval Lord
  - George Hay
  - Thomas Orby Hunter
  - Gilbert Elliot
  - John Forbes, Naval Lord
- 26 September 1757: Commission.
  - George Anson, 1st Baron Anson, First Lord
  - Edward Boscawen, Senior Naval Lord
  - George Hay
  - Thomas Orby Hunter
  - Gilbert Elliot
  - John Forbes, Naval Lord

== 1761 to 1782 ==
- 19 March 1761: Commission.
  - George Anson, 1st Baron Anson, First Lord
  - George Hay
  - Thomas Orby Hunter
  - John Forbes, Senior Naval Lord
  - Hans Stanley
  - George Villiers, Viscount Villiers
  - Thomas Pelham
- 17 June 1762: Commission.
  - George Montague-Dunk, 2nd Earl of Halifax, First Lord
  - George Hay
  - Thomas Orby Hunter
  - John Forbes, Senior Naval Lord
  - Hans Stanley
  - George Villiers, Viscount Villiers
  - Thomas Pelham
- 18 October 1762: Commission.
  - George Grenville, First Lord
  - George Hay
  - Thomas Orby Hunter
  - John Forbes, Senior Naval Lord
  - Hans Stanley
  - George Villiers, Viscount Villiers
  - Thomas Pelham
- 1 January 1763: Commission.
  - George Grenville, First Lord
  - George Hay
  - Thomas Orby Hunter
  - John Forbes, Senior Naval Lord
  - Hans Stanley
  - John Proby, 1st Baron Carysfort
  - James Harris
- 20 April 1763: Commission.
  - John Montagu, 4th Earl of Sandwich, First Lord
  - George Hay
  - Hans Stanley
  - John Proby, 1st Baron Carysfort
  - Richard Howe, 1st Viscount Howe, Senior Naval Lord
  - Henry Digby, 7th and 1st Baron Digby
  - Thomas Pitt
- 16 September 1763: Commission.
  - John Perceval, 2nd Earl of Egmont, First Lord
  - George Hay
  - Hans Stanley
  - John Proby, 1st Baron Carysfort
  - Richard Howe, 1st Viscount Howe, Senior Naval Lord
  - Henry Digby, 7th and 1st Baron Digby
  - Thomas Pitt
- 31 July 1765: Commission.
  - John Perceval, 2nd Earl of Egmont, First Lord
  - Thomas Pitt
  - Sir Charles Saunders, Senior Naval Lord
  - Augustus Keppel, Naval Lord
  - Charles Townshend
  - Sir William Meredith, 3rd Baronet
  - John Buller
- 21 December 1765: Commission.
  - John Perceval, 2nd Earl of Egmont, First Lord
  - Sir Charles Saunders, Senior Naval Lord
  - Augustus Keppel, Naval Lord
  - Charles Townshend
  - Sir William Meredith, 3rd Baronet
  - John Buller
  - John Yorke
- 15 September 1766: Commission.
  - Sir Charles Saunders, First Lord
  - Augustus Keppel, Senior Naval Lord
  - Charles Townshend
  - Sir William Meredith, 3rd Baronet
  - John Buller
  - Henry Temple, 2nd Viscount Palmerston
  - Sir George Yonge, 5th Baronet
- 11 December 1766: Commission.
  - Sir Edward Hawke, First Lord
  - Charles Townshend
  - John Buller
  - Henry Temple, 2nd Viscount Palmerston
  - Sir George Yonge, 5th Baronet
  - Sir Peircy Brett, Senior Naval Lord
  - Charles Jenkinson
- 8 March 1768: Commission.
  - Sir Edward Hawke, First Lord
  - Charles Townshend
  - John Buller
  - Henry Temple, 2nd Viscount Palmerston
  - Sir George Yonge, 5th Baronet
  - Sir Peircy Brett, Senior Naval Lord
  - Lord Charles Spencer
- 28 February 1770: Commission.
  - Sir Edward Hawke, First Lord
  - John Buller
  - Henry Temple, 2nd Viscount Palmerston
  - Lord Charles Spencer
  - Wilmot Vaughan, 4th Viscount Lisburne
  - Francis Holburne, Senior Naval Lord
  - Charles James Fox
- 12 January 1771: Commission.
  - John Montagu, 4th Earl of Sandwich, First Lord
  - John Buller
  - Henry Temple, 2nd Viscount Palmerston
  - Lord Charles Spencer
  - Wilmot Vaughan, 4th Viscount Lisburne
  - Francis Holburne, Senior Naval Lord
  - Charles James Fox
- 2 February 1771: Commission.
  - John Montagu, 4th Earl of Sandwich, First Lord
  - John Buller
  - Henry Temple, 2nd Viscount Palmerston
  - Lord Charles Spencer
  - Wilmot Vaughan, 4th Viscount Lisburne
  - Charles James Fox
  - Augustus John Hervey, First Naval Lord
- 6 May 1772: Commission.
  - John Montagu, 4th Earl of Sandwich, First Lord
  - John Buller
  - Henry Temple, 2nd Viscount Palmerston
  - Lord Charles Spencer
  - Wilmot Vaughan, 4th Viscount Lisburne
  - Augustus John Hervey, First Naval Lord
  - Thomas Bradshaw
- 30 December 1774: Commission.
  - John Montagu, 4th Earl of Sandwich, First Lord
  - John Buller
  - Henry Temple, 2nd Viscount Palmerston
  - Lord Charles Spencer
  - Wilmot Vaughan, 4th Viscount Lisburne
  - Augustus John Hervey, First Naval Lord
  - Henry Penton
- 12 April 1775: Commission.
  - John Montagu, 4th Earl of Sandwich, First Lord
  - John Buller
  - Henry Temple, 2nd Viscount Palmerston
  - Lord Charles Spencer
  - Wilmot Vaughan, 4th Viscount Lisburne
  - Henry Penton
  - Sir Hugh Palliser, First Naval Lord
- 15 December 1777: Commission.
  - John Montagu, 4th Earl of Sandwich, First Lord
  - John Buller
  - Lord Charles Spencer
  - Wilmot Vaughan, 1st Earl of Lisburne
  - Henry Penton
  - Sir Hugh Palliser, First Naval Lord
  - Constantine John Phipps, 2nd Baron Mulgrave
- 23 April 1779: Commission.
  - John Montagu, 4th Earl of Sandwich, First Lord
  - John Buller
  - Lord Charles Spencer
  - Wilmot Vaughan, 1st Earl of Lisburne
  - Henry Penton
  - Constantine John Phipps, 2nd Baron Mulgrave
  - Robert Man, First Naval Lord
- 16 July 1779: Commission.
  - John Montagu, 4th Earl of Sandwich, First Lord
  - John Buller
  - Wilmot Vaughan, 1st Earl of Lisburne
  - Henry Penton
  - Constantine John Phipps, 2nd Baron Mulgrave
  - Robert Man, First Naval Lord
  - Bamber Gascoyne
- 22 September 1780: Commission.
  - John Montagu, 4th Earl of Sandwich, First Lord
  - Wilmot Vaughan, 1st Earl of Lisburne
  - Henry Penton
  - Constantine John Phipps, 2nd Baron Mulgrave
  - Bamber Gascoyne
  - Charles Francis Greville
  - George Darby, First Naval Lord

== 1782 to 1801 ==
- 1 April 1782: Commission.
  - Augustus Keppel, First Lord
  - Sir Robert Harland, 1st Baronet, First Naval Lord
  - Hugh Pigot, Naval Lord
  - Frederick Ponsonby, Viscount Duncannon
  - John Townshend
  - Charles Brett
  - Richard Hopkins
- 18 July 1782: Commission.
  - Augustus Keppel, 1st Viscount Keppel, First Lord
  - Sir Robert Harland, 1st Baronet, First Naval Lord
  - Hugh Pigot, Naval Lord
  - Charles Brett
  - Richard Hopkins
  - John Jeffreys Pratt
  - John Aubrey
- 30 January 1783: Commission.
  - Richard Howe, 1st Viscount Howe, First Lord
  - Hugh Pigot, First Naval Lord
  - Charles Brett
  - Richard Hopkins
  - John Jeffreys Pratt
  - John Aubrey
  - John Leveson-Gower, Naval Lord
- 10 April 1783: Commission.
  - Augustus Keppel, 1st Viscount Keppel, First Lord
  - Hugh Pigot, First Naval Lord
  - Frederick Ponsonby, Viscount Duncannon
  - John Townshend
  - Sir John Lindsay, Naval Lord
  - William Jolliffe
  - Whitshed Keene
- 31 December 1783: Commission.
  - Richard Howe, 1st Viscount Howe, First Lord
  - Charles Brett
  - John Jeffreys Pratt
  - John Leveson-Gower, First Naval Lord
  - Henry Bathurst, Baron Apsley
  - Charles George Perceval
  - John Modyford Heywood
- 2 April 1784: Commission.
  - Richard Howe, 1st Viscount Howe, First Lord
  - Charles Brett
  - Richard Hopkins
  - John Jeffreys Pratt
  - John Leveson-Gower, First Naval Lord
  - Henry Bathurst, Baron Apsley
  - Charles George Perceval
- 16 July 1788: Commission.
  - John Pitt, 2nd Earl of Chatham, First Lord
  - Richard Hopkins
  - John Pratt, 1st Viscount Bayham
  - John Leveson-Gower, First Naval Lord
  - Henry Bathurst, Baron Apsley
  - Charles George Perceval, 2nd Baron Arden
  - Samuel Hood, 1st Baron Hood, Naval Lord
- 12 August 1789: Commission.
  - John Pitt, 2nd Earl of Chatham, First Lord
  - Richard Hopkins
  - Charles George Perceval, 2nd Baron Arden
  - Samuel Hood, 1st Baron Hood, First Naval Lord
  - Sir Francis Samuel Drake, Naval Lord
  - Robert Grosvenor, Viscount Belgrave
  - John Thomas Townshend
- 19 January 1790: Commission.
  - John Pitt, 2nd Earl of Chatham, First Lord
  - Richard Hopkins
  - Charles George Perceval, 2nd Baron Arden
  - Samuel Hood, 1st Baron Hood, First Naval Lord
  - Robert Grosvenor, Viscount Belgrave
  - John Thomas Townshend
  - Alan Gardner, Naval Lord
- 27 June 1791: Commission.
  - John Pitt, 2nd Earl of Chatham, First Lord
  - Charles George Perceval, 2nd Baron Arden
  - Samuel Hood, 1st Baron Hood, First Naval Lord
  - John Thomas Townshend
  - Alan Gardner, Naval Lord
  - John Smyth
  - Charles Small Pybus
- 26 April 1793: Commission.
  - John Pitt, 2nd Earl of Chatham, First Lord
  - Charles George Perceval, 2nd Baron Arden
  - Samuel Hood, 1st Baron Hood, First Naval Lord
  - Alan Gardner, Naval Lord
  - John Smyth
  - Charles Small Pybus
  - Philip Affleck, Naval Lord
- 12 May 1794: Commission.
  - John Pitt, 2nd Earl of Chatham, First Lord
  - Charles George Perceval, 2nd Baron Arden
  - Samuel Hood, 1st Baron Hood, First Naval Lord
  - Alan Gardner, Naval Lord
  - Charles Small Pybus
  - Philip Affleck, Naval Lord
  - Sir Charles Middleton, 1st Baronet, Naval Lord
- 19 December 1794: Commission.
  - George John Spencer, 2nd Earl Spencer, First Lord
  - Charles George Perceval, 2nd Baron Arden
  - Samuel Hood, 1st Baron, First Naval Lord
  - Sir Alan Gardner, 1st Baronet, Naval Lord
  - Charles Small Pybus
  - Philip Affleck, Naval Lord
  - Sir Charles Middleton, 1st Baronet, Naval Lord
- 7 March 1795: Commission
  - George John Spencer, 2nd Earl Spencer, First Lord
  - Charles George Perceval, 2nd Baron Arden
  - Charles Small Pybus
  - Sir Charles Middleton, 1st Baronet, First Naval Lord
  - Lord Hugh Seymour
  - Philip Stephens
  - James Gambier, Naval Lord
- 20 November 1795: Commission
  - George John Spencer, 2nd Earl Spencer, First Lord
  - Charles George Perceval, 2nd Baron Arden
  - Charles Small Pybus
  - Lord Hugh Seymour
  - Sir Philip Stephens, 1st Baronet
  - James Gambier, First Naval Lord
  - William Young, Naval Lord
- 25 July 1797: Commission
  - George John Spencer, 2nd Earl Spencer, First Lord
  - Charles George Perceval, 2nd Baron Arden
  - Lord Hugh Seymour
  - Sir Philip Stephens, 1st Baronet
  - James Gambier, First Naval Lord
  - William Young, Naval Lord
  - Thomas Wallace
- 10 September 1798: Commission
  - George John Spencer, 2nd Earl Spencer, First Lord
  - Charles George Perceval, 2nd Baron Arden
  - Sir Philip Stephens, 1st Baronet
  - James Gambier, First Naval Lord
  - William Young, Naval Lord
  - Thomas Wallace
  - Robert Mann, Naval Lord
- 10 July 1800: Commission
  - George John Spencer, 2nd Earl Spencer, First Lord
  - Charles George Perceval, 2nd Baron Arden
  - Sir Philip Stephens, 1st Baronet
  - James Gambier, First Naval Lord
  - William Young, Naval Lord
  - Robert Mann, Naval Lord
  - William Eliot

== 1801 to 1822 ==
- 19 February 1801: Commission.
  - John Jervis, 1st Earl of St Vincent, First Lord
  - Sir Philip Stephens, 1st Baronet
  - William Eliot
  - Sir Thomas Troubridge, 1st Baronet, First Naval Lord
  - James Adams
  - John Markham, Naval Lord
  - William Garthshore
- 17 January 1804: Commission.
  - John Jervis, 1st Earl of St Vincent, First Lord
  - Sir Philip Stephens, 1st Baronet
  - Sir Thomas Troubridge, 1st Baronet, First Naval Lord
  - James Adams
  - John Markham, Naval Lord
  - John Lemon
  - Sir Harry Burrard-Neale, 2nd Baronet, Naval Lord
- 15 May 1804: Commission.
  - Henry Dundas, 1st Viscount Melville, First Lord
  - Sir Philip Stephens, 1st Baronet
  - James Gambier, First Naval Lord
  - Sir Harry Burrard-Neale, 2nd Baronet, Naval Lord
  - Sir John Colpoys, Naval Lord
  - Philip Patton, Naval Lord
  - William Dickinson
- 13 September 1804: Commission.
  - Henry Dundas, 1st Viscount Melville, First Lord
  - Sir Philip Stephens, 1st Baronet
  - James Gambier, First Naval Lord
  - Sir John Colpoys, Naval Lord
  - Philip Patton, Naval Lord
  - William Dickinson
  - Sir Evan Nepean,1st Baronet
- 2 May 1805: Commission.
  - Charles Middleton, 1st Baron Barham, First Lord
  - Sir Philip Stephens, 1st Baronet
  - James Gambier, First Naval Lord
  - Philip Patton, Naval Lord
  - William Dickinson
  - Sir Evan Nepean, 1st Baronet
  - George Stewart, Lord Garlies, Naval Lord
- 10 February 1806: Commission.
  - Charles Grey, First Lord
  - Sir Philip Stephens, 1st Baronet
  - John Markham, First Naval Lord
  - Sir Charles Pole, 1st Baronet, Naval Lord
  - Sir Harry Burrard-Neale, 2nd Baronet, Naval Lord
  - Lord William Russell
  - William Edwardes, 2nd Baron Kensington
- 29 September 1806: Commission.
  - Thomas Grenville, First Lord
  - Sir Philip Stephens, 1st Baronet
  - John Markham, First Naval Lord
  - Sir Charles Pole, 1st Baronet, Naval Lord
  - Sir Harry Burrard-Neale, 2nd Baronet, Naval Lord
  - Lord William Russell
  - William Edwardes, 2nd Baron Kensington
- 23 October 1806: Commission.
  - Thomas Grenville, First Lord
  - John Markham, First Naval Lord
  - Sir Harry Burrard-Neale, 2nd Baronet, Naval Lord
  - Lord William Russell
  - William Edwardes, 2nd Baron Kensington
  - Thomas Fremantle, Naval Lord
  - William Frankland
- 6 April 1807: Commission.
  - Henry Phipps, 3rd Baron Mulgrave, First Lord
  - James Gambier, First Naval Lord
  - Sir Richard Bickerton, 2nd Baronet, Naval Lord
  - William Johnstone Hope, Naval Lord
  - Robert Plumer Ward
  - Henry John Temple, 3rd Viscount Palmerston
  - James Buller
- 9 May 1808: Commission.
  - Henry Phipps, 3rd Baron Mulgrave, First Lord
  - Sir Richard Bickerton, 2nd Baronet, First Naval Lord
  - William Johnstone Hope, Naval Lord
  - Robert Plumer Ward
  - Henry John Temple, 3rd Viscount Palmerston
  - James Buller
  - William Domett, Naval Lord
- 30 March 1809: Commission.
  - Henry Phipps, 3rd Baron Mulgrave, First Lord
  - [Sir Richard Bickerton, 2nd Baronet, First Naval Lord
  - Robert Plumer Ward
  - Henry John Temple, 3rd Viscount Palmerston
  - James Buller
  - William Domett, Naval Lord
  - Robert Moorsom, Naval Lord
- 24 November 1809: Commission.
  - Henry Phipps, 3rd Baron Mulgrave, First Lord
  - Sir Richard Bickerton, 2nd Baronet, First Naval Lord
  - Robert Plumer Ward
  - James Buller
  - William Domett, Naval Lord
  - Robert Moorsom, Naval Lord
  - William Lowther, Viscount Lowther
- 4 May 1810: Commission.
  - Charles Philip Yorke, First Lord
  - Sir Richard Bickerton, 2nd Baronet, First Naval Lord
  - Robert Plumer Ward
  - James Buller
  - William Domett, Naval Lord
  - Robert Moorsom, Naval Lord
  - William Lowther, Viscount Lowther
- 3 July 1810: Commission.
  - Charles Philip Yorke, First Lord
  - Sir Richard Bickerton, 2nd Baronet, First Naval Lord
  - Robert Plumer Ward
  - James Buller
  - William Domett, Naval Lord
  - Sir Joseph Sydney Yorke, Naval Lord
  - Frederick John Robinson
- 17 June 1811: Commission.
  - Charles Philip Yorke, First Lord
  - Sir Richard Bickerton, 2nd Baronet, First Naval Lord
  - James Buller
  - William Domett, Naval Lord
  - Sir Joseph Sidney Yorke, Naval Lord
  - Frederick John Robinson
  - Horatio Walpole, Baron Walpole
- 25 March 1812: Commission.
  - Robert Saunders Dundas, 2nd Viscount Melville, First Lord
  - William Domett, First Naval Lord
  - Sir Joseph Sydney Yorke, Naval Lord
  - Frederick John Robinson
  - Horatio Walpole, Baron Walpole
  - William Dundas
  - George Johnstone Hope, Naval Lord
- 5 October 1812: Commission.
  - Robert Saunders Dundas, 2nd Viscount Melville, First Lord
  - William Domett, First Naval Lord
  - Sir Joseph Sydney Yorke, Naval Lord
  - William Dundas
  - George Johnstone Hope, Naval Lord
  - Sir George Warrender, 4th Baronet
  - John Osborn
- 18 May 1813: Commission.
  - Robert Saunders Dundas, 2nd Viscount Melville, First Lord
  - William Domett, First Naval Lord
  - Sir Joseph Sydney Yorke, Naval Lord
  - William Dundas
  - Sir George Warrender, 4th Baronet
  - John Osborn
  - Lord Henry Paulet, Naval Lord
- 23 October 1813: Commission.
  - Robert Saunders Dundas, 2nd Viscount Melville, First Lord
  - Sir Joseph Sydney Yorke, First Naval Lord
  - William Dundas
  - George Johnstone Hope, Naval Lord
  - Sir George Warrender, 4th Baronet
  - John Osborn
  - Lord Henry Paulet, Naval Lord
- 23 August 1814: Commission.
  - Robert Saunders Dundas, 2nd Viscount Melville, First Lord
  - Sir Joseph Sydney Yorke, First Naval Lord
  - George Johnstone Hope, Naval Lord
  - Sir George Warrender, 4th Baronet
  - John Osborn
  - Lord Henry Paulet, Naval Lord
  - Barrington Pope Blachford
- 24 May 1816: Commission.
  - Robert Saunders Dundas, 2nd Viscount Melville, First Lord
  - Sir Joseph Sydney Yorke, Naval Lord
  - George Johnstone Hope, Naval Lord
  - Sir George Warrender, 4th Baronet
  - John Osborn
  - Sir Graham Moore, First Naval Lord
  - Henry Somerset, Marquess of Worcester
- 2 April 1818: Commission.
  - Robert Saunders Dundas, 2nd Viscount Melville, First Lord
  - Sir George Warrender, 4th Baronet
  - John Osborn
  - Sir Graham Moore, First Naval Lord
  - Henry Somerset, Marquess of Worcester
  - Sir George Cockburn, Naval Lord
  - Sir Henry Hotham, Naval Lord
- 15 March 1819: Commission.
  - Robert Saunders Dundas, 2nd Viscount Melville, First Lord
  - Sir George Warrender, 4th Baronet
  - Sir John Osborn, 5th Baronet
  - Sir Graham Moore, First Naval Lord
  - Sir George Cockburn, Naval Lord
  - Sir Henry Hotham, Naval Lord
  - Sir George Clerk, 6th Baronet
- 13 March 1820: Commission.
  - Robert Saunders Dundas, 2nd Viscount Melville, First Lord
  - Sir William Johnstone Hope, First Naval Lord
  - Sir George Warrender, 4th Baronet
  - Sir John Osborn, 5th Baronet
  - Sir George Cockburn, Naval Lord
  - Sir Henry Hotham, Naval Lord
  - Sir George Clerk, 6th Baronet

== 1822 to 1841 ==
- 8 February 1822: Commission.
  - Robert Saunders Dundas, 2nd Viscount Melville, First Lord
  - Sir William Johnstone Hope, First Naval Lord
  - Sir John Osborn, 5th Baronet
  - Sir George Cockburn, Naval Lord
  - Sir Henry Hotham, Naval Lord
  - Sir George Clerk, 6th Baronet, Civil Lord
  - William Robert Keith Douglas
- 23 March 1822: Commission.
  - Robert Saunders Dundas, 2nd Viscount Melville, First Lord
  - Sir William Johnstone Hope, First Naval Lord
  - Sir John Osborn, 5th Baronet
  - Sir George Cockburn, Naval Lord
  - Sir George Clerk, 6th Baronet, Civil Lord
- 16 February 1824: Commission.
  - Robert Saunders Dundas, 2nd Viscount Melville, First Lord
  - Sir William Johnstone Hope, First Naval Lord
  - Sir George Cockburn, Naval Lord
  - Sir George Clerk, 6th Baronet, Civil Lord
  - William Robert Keith Douglas
- 2 May 1827: William, Duke of Clarence and St Andrews, Lord High Admiral
  - Council of the Lord High Admiral, 2 May 1827:
    - Sir William Johnstone Hope Senior Member
    - Sir George Cockburn
    - William Robert Keith Douglas
    - John Evelyn Denison
  - Council of the Lord High Admiral, 4 February 1828:
    - Sir William Johnstone Hope Senior Member
    - Sir George Cockburn
    - Sir George Clerk, 6th Baronet, Civil Lord
    - George Charles Pratt, Earl of Brecknock
  - Council of the Lord High Admiral, 12 March 1828:
    - Sir George Cockburn Senior Member
    - Sir George Clerk, 6th Baronet, Civil Lord
    - George Charles Pratt, Earl of Brecknock
    - Sir Edward William Campbell Rich Owen
- 19 September 1828: Commission.
  - Robert Saunders Dundas, 2nd Viscount Melville, First Lord
  - Sir George Cockburn, First Naval Lord
  - Sir Henry Hotham, Naval Lord
  - Sir George Clerk, 6th Baronet, Civil Lord
  - George Charles Pratt, Earl of Brecknock
- 15 July 1829: Commission.
  - Robert Saunders Dundas, 2nd Viscount Melville, First Lord
  - Sir George Cockburn, First Naval Lord
  - Sir Henry Hotham, Naval Lord
  - Sir George Clerk, 6th Baronet, Civil Lord
  - Frederick Stewart, Viscount Castlereagh, Civil Lord
- 31 July 1830: Commission.
  - Robert Saunders Dundas, 2nd Viscount Melville, First Lord
  - Sir George Cockburn, First Naval Lord
  - Sir Henry Hotham, Naval Lord
  - Frederick Stewart, Viscount Castlereagh, Civil Lord
  - Charles Ross, Civil Lord
- 25 November 1830: Commission.
  - Sir James Graham, 2nd Baronet, First Lord
  - Sir Thomas Hardy, 1st Baronet, First Naval Lord
  - George Heneage Lawrence Dundas, Second Naval Lord
  - Sir Samuel Pechell, Third Naval Lord
  - George Barrington, Fourth Naval Lord
- 8 June 1832: Commission.
  - Sir James Graham, 2nd Baronet, First Lord
  - Sir Thomas Hardy, 1st Baronet, First Naval Lord
  - George Heneage Lawrence Dundas, Second Naval Lord
  - Sir Samuel Pechell, Third Naval Lord
  - George Barrington, Fourth Naval Lord
  - Henry Labouchere, Civil Lord
- 13 April 1833: Commission.
  - Sir James Graham, 2nd Baronet, First Lord
  - Sir Thomas Hardy, 1st Baronet, First Naval Lord
  - George Heneage Lawrence Dundas, Second Naval Lord
  - Sir Samuel Pechell, Third Naval Lord
  - Henry Labouchere, Civil Lord
  - Maurice Frederick FitzHardinge Berkeley, Fourth Naval Lord
- 11 June 1834: Commission.
  - George Eden, 1st Earl of Auckland, First Lord
  - Sir Thomas Hardy, 1st Baronet, First Naval Lord
  - George Heneage Lawrence Dundas, Second Naval Lord
  - Sir Samuel Pechell, Third Naval Lord
  - Henry Labouchere, Civil Lord
  - Maurice Frederick FitzHardinge Berkeley, Fourth Naval Lord
- 1 August 1834: Commission.
  - George Eden, 1st Earl of Auckland, First Lord
  - George Heneage Lawrence Dundas, First Naval Lord
  - Sir William Parker, 1st Baronet, Second Naval Lord
  - Sir Samuel Pechell, Third Naval Lord
  - Henry Labouchere, Civil Lord
  - Maurice Frederick FitzHardinge Berkeley, Fourth Naval Lord
- 1 November 1834: Commission.
  - George Eden, 1st Earl of Auckland, First Lord
  - Charles Adam, First Naval Lord
  - Sir William Parker, 1st Baronet, Second Naval Lord
  - Sir Samuel Pechell, Third Naval Lord
  - Henry Labouchere, Civil Lord
  - Maurice Frederick FitzHardinge Berkeley, Fourth Naval Lord
- 23 December 1834: Commission.
  - Thomas Philip de Grey, 2nd Earl de Grey, First Lord
  - Sir George Cockburn, First Naval Lord
  - Sir John Beresford, 1st Baronet, Second Naval Lord
  - Sir Charles Rowley, 1st Baronet, Third Naval Lord
  - Anthony Ashley Cooper, Baron Ashley, Civil Lord
  - Maurice FitzGerald, Civil Lord
- 25 April 1835: Commission.
  - George Eden, 1st Earl of Auckland, First Lord
  - Charles Adam, First Naval Lord
  - Sir William Parker, 1st Baronet, Second Naval Lord
  - George Elliot, Third Naval Lord
  - Sir Edward Troubridge, 2nd Baronet, Fourth Naval Lord
  - Archibald Primrose, Lord Dalmeny, Civil Lord
- 19 September 1835: Commission.
  - Gilbert Elliot-Murray-Kynynmound, 2nd Earl of Minto, First Lord
  - Sir Charles Adam, First Naval Lord
  - Sir William Parker, 1st Baronet, Second Naval Lord
  - George Elliot, Third Naval Lord
  - Sir Edward Troubridge, 2nd Baronet, Fourth Naval Lord
  - Archibald Primrose, Lord Dalmeny, Civil Lord
- 22 July 1837: Commission.
  - Gilbert Elliot-Murray-Kynynmound, 2nd Earl of Minto, First Lord
  - Sir Charles Adam, First Naval Lord
  - Sir William Parker, 1st Baronet, Second Naval Lord
  - Sir Edward Troubridge, 2nd Baronet, Third Naval Lord
  - Archibald Primrose, Lord Dalmeny, Civil Lord
  - Maurice Frederick FitzHardinge Berkeley, Fourth Naval Lord
- 5 March 1839: Commission.
  - Gilbert Elliot-Murray-Kynynmound, 2nd Earl of Minto, First Lord
  - Sir Charles Adam, First Naval Lord
  - Sir William Parker, 1st Baronet, Second Naval Lord
  - Sir Edward Troubridge, 2nd Baronet, Third Naval Lord
  - Sir Samuel Pechell, Fourth Naval Lord
  - Archibald Primrose, Lord Dalmeny, Civil Lord

== 1841 to 1861 ==
- 25 June 1841: Commission.
  - Gilbert Elliot-Murray-Kynynmound, 2nd Earl of Minto, First Lord
  - Sir Charles Adam, First Naval Lord
  - Sir Edward Troubridge, 2nd Baronet, Second Naval Lord
  - Sir Samuel Pechell, Third Naval Lord
  - Archibald Primrose, Lord Dalmeny, Civil Lord
  - James Whitley Deans Dundas, Fourth Naval Lord
- 8 September 1841: Commission.
  - Thomas Hamilton, 9th Earl of Haddington, First Lord
  - Sir George Cockburn, First Naval Lord
  - Sir William Hall Gage, Second Naval Lord
  - Sir George Francis Seymour, Third Naval Lord
  - William Gordon, Fourth Naval Lord
  - Henry Thomas Lowry-Corry, Civil Lord
- 22 May 1844: Commission.
  - Thomas Hamilton, 9th Earl of Haddington, First Lord
  - Sir George Cockburn, First Naval Lord
  - Sir William Hall Gage, Second Naval Lord
  - William Bowles, Third Naval Lord
  - William Gordon, Fourth Naval Lord
  - Henry Lowry-Corry, Civil Lord
- 12 February 1845: Commission.
  - Thomas Hamilton, 9th Earl of Haddington, First Lord
  - Sir George Cockburn, First Naval Lord
  - Sir William Hall Gage, Second Naval Lord
  - William Bowles, Third Naval Lord
  - William Gordon, Fourth Naval Lord
  - Henry Fitzroy
- 13 January 1846: Commission.
  - Edward Law, 1st Earl of Ellenborough, First Lord
  - Sir George Cockburn, First Naval Lord
  - Sir William Hall Gage, Second Naval Lord
  - William Bowles, Third Naval Lord
  - William Gordon, Fourth Naval Lord
  - Henry Fitzroy
- 17 February 1846: Commission.
  - Edward Law, 1st Earl of Ellenborough, First Lord
  - Sir George Cockburn, First Naval Lord
  - Sir William Hall Gage, Second Naval Lord
  - William Bowles, Third Naval Lord
  - Henry Fitzroy
  - Henry John Rous, Fourth Naval Lord
- 13 July 1846: Commission.
  - George Eden, 1st Earl of Auckland, First Lord
  - Sir William Parker, 1st Baronet, First Naval Lord
  - James Whitley Deans Dundas, Second Naval Lord
  - Maurice FitzHardinge Berkeley, Third Naval Lord
  - Lord John Hay, Fourth Naval Lord
  - William Francis Cowper, Civil Lord
- 24 July 1846: Commission.
  - George Eden, 1st Earl of Auckland, First Lord
  - Sir Charles Adam, First Naval Lord
  - James Whitley Deans Dundas, Second Naval Lord
  - Maurice FitzHardinge Berkeley, Third Naval Lord
  - Lord John Hay, Fourth Naval Lord
  - William Francis Cowper, Civil Lord
- 20 July 1847: Commission.
  - George Eden, 1st Earl of Auckland, First Lord
  - James Whitley Deans Dundas, First Naval Lord
  - Henry Prescott, Second Naval Lord
  - Maurice FitzHardinge Berkeley, Third Naval Lord
  - Lord John Hay, Fourth Naval Lord
  - William Francis Cowper, Civil Lord
- 23 December 1847: Commission.
  - George Eden, 1st Earl of Auckland, First Lord
  - James Whitley Deans Dundas, First Naval Lord
  - Maurice FitzHardinge Berkeley, Second Naval Lord
  - Lord John Hay, Third Naval Lord
  - William Francis Cowper, Civil Lord
  - Alexander Milne, Fourth Naval Lord
- 18 January 1849: Commission.
  - Sir Francis Thornhill Baring, First Lord
  - James Whitley Deans Dundas, First Naval Lord
  - Maurice FitzHardinge Berkeley, Second Naval Lord
  - Lord John Hay, Third Naval Lord
  - William Francis Cowper, Civil Lord
  - Alexander Milne, Fourth Naval Lord
- 9 February 1850: Commission.
  - Sir Francis Thornhill Baring, First Lord
  - James Whitley Deans Dundas, First Naval Lord
  - Maurice FitzHardinge Berkeley, Second Naval Lord
  - Houston Stewart, Third Naval Lord
  - Alexander Milne, Fourth Naval Lord
  - William Francis Cowper, Civil Lord
- 13 February 1852: Commission.
  - Sir Francis Thornhill Baring, First Lord
  - Maurice FitzHardinge Berkeley, First Naval Lord
  - Houston Stewart, Second Naval Lord
  - Sir James Stirling, Third Naval Lord
  - William Francis Cowper, Civil Lord
- 2 March 1852: Commission.
  - Algernon Percy, 4th Duke of Northumberland, First Lord
  - Hyde Parker, First Naval Lord
  - Phipps Hornby, Second Naval Lord
  - Sir Thomas Herbert, Third Naval Lord
  - Arthur Duncombe, Fourth Naval Lord
  - Alexander Milne, Fifth Naval Lord
- 5 January 1853: Commission.
  - Sir James Graham, 2nd Baronet, First Lord
  - Hyde Parker, First Naval Lord
  - Maurice FitzHardinge Berkeley, Second Naval Lord
  - Richard Saunders Dundas, Third Naval Lord
  - Alexander Milne, Fourth Naval Lord
  - William Francis Cowper, Civil Lord
- 3 June 1854: Commission.
  - Sir James Graham, 2nd Baronet, First Lord
  - Maurice FitzHardinge Berkeley, First Naval Lord
  - Richard Saunders Dundas, Second Naval Lord
  - Peter Richards, Third Naval Lord
  - Alexander Milne, Fourth Naval Lord
  - William Francis Cowper, Civil Lord
- 8 March 1855: Commission.
  - Sir Charles Wood, 3rd Baronet, First Lord
  - Maurice FitzHardinge Berkeley, First Naval Lord
  - Henry Eden, Second Naval Lord
  - Peter Richards, Third Naval Lord
  - Alexander Milne, Fourth Naval Lord
- 14 March 1855: Commission.
  - Sir Charles Wood, 3rd Baronet, First Lord
  - Maurice FitzHardinge Berkeley, First Naval Lord
  - Henry Eden, Second Naval Lord
  - Peter Richards, Third Naval Lord
  - Alexander Milne, Fourth Naval Lord
  - Sir Robert Peel, 3rd Baronet, Civil Lord
- 2 April 1857: Commission.
  - Sir Charles Wood, Baronet, First Lord
  - Sir Maurice FitzHardinge Berkeley, First Naval Lord
  - Sir Richard Saunders Dundas, Second Naval Lord
  - Henry Eden, Third Naval Lord
  - Alexander Milne, Fourth Naval Lord
  - Sir Robert Peel, 3rd Baronet, Civil Lord
- 30 May 1857: Commission.
  - Sir Charles Wood, 3rd Baronet, First Lord
  - Sir Maurice FitzHardinge Berkeley, First Naval Lord
  - Sir Richard Saunders Dundas, Second Naval Lord
  - Henry Eden, Third Naval Lord
  - Alexander Milne, Fourth Naval Lord
  - Thomas George Baring, Civil Lord
- 24 November 1857: Commission.
  - Sir Charles Wood, 3rd Baronet, First Lord
  - Sir Richard Saunders Dundas, First Naval Lord
  - Henry Eden, Second Naval Lord
  - Alexander Milne, Third Naval Lord
  - Frederick Thomas Pelham, Fourth Naval Lord
  - Thomas George Baring, Civil Lord
- 8 March 1858: Commission
  - Sir John Somerset Pakington, 1st Baronet, First Lord
  - William Fanshawe Martin, First Naval Lord
  - Sir Richard Saunders Dundas, Second Naval Lord
  - Alexander Milne, Third Naval Lord
  - James Robert Drummond, Fourth Naval Lord
  - Algernon Percy, Baron Lovaine, Civil Lord
- 28 January 1859: Commission
  - Sir John Somerset Pakington, 1st Baronet, First Lord
  - William Fanshawe Martin, First Naval Lord
  - Sir Richard Saunders Dundas, Second Naval Lord
  - Alexander Milne, Third Naval Lord
  - Swynfen Carnegie, Fourth Naval Lord
  - Algernon Percy, Baron Lovaine, Civil Lord
- 11 March 1859: Commission
  - Sir John Somerset Pakington, 1st Baronet, First Lord
  - William Fanshawe Martin, First Naval Lord
  - Sir Richard Saunders Dundas, Second Naval Lord
  - Alexander Milne, Third Naval Lord
  - Swynfen Carnegie, Fourth Naval Lord
  - Frederick Lygon, Civil Lord
- 23 April 1859: Commission
  - Sir John Somerset Pakington, 1st Baronet, First Lord
  - William Fanshawe Martin, First Naval Lord
  - Sir Richard Saunders Dundas, Second Naval Lord
  - Sir Henry John Leeke, Third Naval Lord
  - Alexander Milne, Fourth Naval Lord
  - Frederick Lygon, Civil Lord
- 28 June 1859: Commission
  - Edward Seymour, 12th Duke of Somerset, First Lord
  - Sir Richard Saunders Dundas, First Naval Lord
  - Frederick Thomas Pelham, Second Naval Lord
  - Charles Eden, Third Naval Lord
  - Charles Frederick, Fourth Naval Lord
  - Samuel Whitbread, Civil Lord
- 15 June 1861: Commission
  - Edward Seymour, 12th Duke of Somerset, First Lord
  - Sir Frederick Grey, First Naval Lord
  - Charles Eden, Second Naval Lord
  - Charles Frederick, Third Naval Lord
  - James Robert Drummond, Fourth Naval Lord
  - Samuel Whitbread, Civil Lord

== 1861 to 1882 ==
- 27 March 1863: Commission.
  - Edward Seymour, 12th Duke of Somerset, First Lord
  - Sir Frederick Grey, First Naval Lord
  - Charles Eden, Second Naval Lord
  - Charles Frederick, Third Naval Lord
  - James Robert Drummond, Fourth Naval Lord
  - Spencer Cavendish, Marquess of Hartington, Civil Lord
- 5 May 1863: Commission.
  - Edward Seymour, 12th Duke of Somerset, First Lord
  - Sir Frederick Grey, First Naval Lord
  - Charles Eden, Second Naval Lord
  - Charles Frederick, Third Naval Lord
  - James Robert Drummond, Fourth Naval Lord
  - James Stansfeld, Civil Lord
- 22 April 1864: Commission.
  - Edward Seymour, 12th Duke of Somerset, First Lord
  - Sir Frederick Grey, First Naval Lord
  - Charles Eden, Second Naval Lord
  - Charles Frederick, Third Naval Lord
  - James Robert Drummond, Fourth Naval Lord
  - Hugh Childers, Civil Lord
- 25 March 1865: Commission.
  - Edward Seymour, 12th Duke of Somerset, First Lord
  - Sir Frederick Grey, First Naval Lord
  - Charles Eden, Second Naval Lord
  - Edward Fanshawe, Third Naval Lord
  - James Robert Drummond, Fourth Naval Lord
  - Hugh Childers, Civil Lord
- 23 January 1866: Commission.
  - Edward Seymour, 12th Duke of Somerset|, First Lord
  - Sir Frederick Grey, First Naval Lord
  - Charles Eden, Second Naval Lord
  - Edward Fanshawe, Third Naval Lord
  - James Robert Drummond, Fourth Naval Lord
  - Henry Fenwick, Civil Lord
- 10 April 1866: Commission.
  - Edward Seymour, 12th Duke of Somerset, First Lord
  - Sir Frederick Grey, First Naval Lord
  - Charles Eden, Second Naval Lord
  - Edward Fanshawe, Third Naval Lord
  - James Robert Drummond, Fourth Naval Lord
  - Lord John Hay, Fifth Naval Lord
- 9 May 1866: Commission.
  - Edward Seymour, 12th Duke of Somerset, First Lord
  - Sir Frederick Grey, First Naval Lord
  - Charles Eden, Second Naval Lord
  - Edward Fanshawe, Third Naval Lord
  - James Robert Drummond, Fourth Naval Lord
  - George John Shaw-Lefevre, Civil Lord
- 13 July 1866: Commission.
  - Sir John Somerset Pakington, 1st Baronet, First Lord
  - Sir Alexander Milne, 1st Baronet, First Naval Lord
  - Sir Sydney Dacres, Second Naval Lord
  - George Henry Seymour, Third Naval Lord
  - Sir John Dalrymple-Hay, 3rd Baronet, Fourth Naval Lord
  - Charles du Cane, Civil Lord
- 8 March 1867: Commission.
  - Henry Thomas Lowry-Corry, First Lord
  - Sir Alexander Milne, 1st Baronet, First Naval Lord
  - Sir Sydney Dacres, Second Naval Lord
  - George Henry Seymour, Third Naval Lord
  - Sir John Dalrymple-Hay, 3rd Baronet, Fourth Naval Lord
  - Charles du Cane, Civil Lord
- 3 September 1868: Commission.
  - Henry Thomas Lowry-Corry, First Lord
  - Sir Alexander Milne, 1st Baronet, First Naval Lord
  - Sir Sydney Dacres, Second Naval Lord
  - George Henry Seymour, Third Naval Lord
  - Sir John Dalrymple-Hay, 3rd Baronet, Fourth Naval Lord
  - Frederick Arthur Stanley, Civil Lord
- 18 December 1868: Commission.
  - Hugh Childers, First Lord
  - Sir Sydney Dacres, First Naval Lord
  - Sir Robert Spencer Robinson, Third Lord
  - Lord John Hay, Junior Naval Lord
  - George Otto Trevelyan, Civil Lord
- 12 July 1870: Commission.
  - Hugh Childers, First Lord
  - Sir Sydney Dacres, First Naval Lord
  - Sir Robert Spencer Robinson, Third Lord
  - Lord John Hay, Junior Naval Lord
  - Robert Haldane-Duncan, 3rd Earl of Camperdown, Civil Lord
- 9 February 1871: Commission
  - Hugh Childers, First Lord
  - Sir Sydney Dacres, First Naval Lord
  - Robert Hall, Third Lord
  - Lord John Hay, Junior Naval Lord
  - Robert Haldane-Duncan, 3rd Earl of Camperdown, Civil Lord
- 9 March 1871: Commission
  - George Goschen, First Lord
  - Sir Sydney Dacres, First Naval Lord
  - Robert Hall, Third Lord
  - Lord John Hay, Junior Naval Lord
  - Robert Haldane-Duncan, 3rd Earl of Camperdown, Civil Lord
- 28 June 1871: Commission
  - George Goschen, First Lord
  - Sir Sydney Dacres, First Naval Lord
  - Robert Hall, Third Lord
  - John Walter Tarleton, Junior Naval Lord
  - Robert Haldane-Duncan, 3rd Earl of Camperdown, Civil Lord
- 4 May 1872: Commission
  - George Goschen, First Lord
  - Sir Sydney Dacres, First Naval Lord
  - John Walter Tarleton, Second Naval Lord
  - Frederick Seymour, Junior Naval Lord
  - Robert Haldane-Duncan, 3rd Earl of Camperdown, Civil Lord
- 27 November 1872: Commission
  - George Goschen, First Lord
  - Sir Alexander Milne, 1st Baronet, First Naval Lord
  - John Walter Tarleton, Second Naval Lord
  - Frederick Seymour, Junior Naval Lord
  - Robert Haldane-Duncan, 3rd Earl of Camperdown, Civil Lord
- 4 March 1874: Commission
  - George Ward Hunt, First Lord
  - Sir Alexander Milne, 1st Baronet, First Naval Lord
  - John Walter Tarleton, Second Naval Lord
  - Richard Meade, Lord Gillford, Junior Naval Lord
  - Sir Massey Lopes, 3rd Baronet, Civil Lord
- 29 December 1874: Commission
  - George Ward Hunt, First Lord
  - Sir Alexander Milne, 1st Baronet, First Naval Lord
  - Geoffrey Hornby, Second Naval Lord
  - Richard Meade, Lord Gillford, Junior Naval Lord
  - Sir Massey Lopes, 3rd Baronet, Civil Lord
- 7 September 1876: Commission
  - George Ward Hunt, First Lord
  - Sir Hastings Yelverton, First Naval Lord
  - Geoffrey Hornby, Second Naval Lord
  - Richard Meade, Lord Gillford, Junior Naval Lord
  - Sir Massey Lopes, 3rd Baronet, Civil Lord
- 11 January 1877: Commission
  - George Ward Hunt, First Lord
  - Sir Hastings Yelverton, First Naval Lord
  - Arthur Acland Hood, Second Naval Lord
  - Richard Meade, Lord Gillford, Junior Naval Lord
  - Sir Massey Lopes, 3rd Baronet, Civil Lord
- 14 August 1877: Commission
  - William Henry Smith, First Lord
  - Sir Hastings Yelverton, First Naval Lord
  - Arthur Acland Hood, Second Naval Lord
  - Richard Meade, Lord Gillford, Junior Naval Lord
  - Sir Massey Lopes, 3rd Baronet, Civil Lord
- 5 November 1877: Commission
  - William Henry Smith, First Lord
  - George Wellesley, First Naval Lord
  - Arthur Acland Hood, Second Naval Lord
  - Richard Meade, Lord Gillford, Junior Naval Lord
  - Sir Massey Lopes, 3rd Baronet, Civil Lord
- 12 August 1879: Commission
  - William Henry Smith, First Lord
  - Sir Astley Cooper Key, First Naval Lord
  - Arthur Acland Hood, Second Naval Lord
  - Richard Meade, Lord Gillford, Junior Naval Lord
  - Sir Massey Lopes, 3rd Baronet, Civil Lord
- 4 December 1879: Commission
  - William Henry Smith, First Lord
  - Sir Astley Cooper Key, First Naval Lord
  - Richard Meade, 4th Earl of Clanwilliam, Second Naval Lord
  - Sir John Edmund Commerell, Junior Naval Lord
  - Sir Massey Lopes, 3rd Baronet, Civil Lord
- 12 May 1880: Commission
  - Thomas Baring, 1st Earl of Northbrook, First Lord
  - Sir Astley Cooper Key, First Naval Lord
  - Lord John Hay, Second Naval Lord
  - Anthony Hoskins, Junior Naval Lord
  - Thomas Brassey, Civil Lord
- 12 April 1882: Commission
  - Thomas Baring, 1st Earl of Northbrook, First Lord
  - Sir Astley Cooper Key, First Naval Lord
  - Lord John Hay, Second Naval Lord
  - Thomas Brandreth, Third Lord
  - Anthony Hoskins, Junior Naval Lord
- 22 July 1882: Commission
  - Thomas Baring, 1st Earl of Northbrook, First Lord
  - Sir Astley Cooper Key, First Naval Lord
  - Lord John Hay, Second Naval Lord
  - Thomas Brandreth, Third Lord
  - Sir Frederick Richards, Junior Naval Lord
  - Sir Thomas Brassey, Civil Lord
  - George Wightwick Rendel, Civil Lord

== 1882 to 1901 ==
- 3 March 1883: Commission
  - Thomas Baring, 1st Earl of Northbrook, First Lord
  - Sir Astley Cooper Key, First Naval Lord
  - Beauchamp Seymour, 1st Baron Alcester, Second Naval Lord
  - Thomas Brandreth, Third Lord
  - Sir Frederick Richards, Junior Naval Lord
  - Sir Thomas Brassey, Civil Lord
  - George Wightwick Rendel, Civil Lord
- 24 November 1884: Commission
  - Thomas Baring, 1st Earl of Northbrook, First Lord
  - Sir Astley Cooper Key, First Naval Lord
  - Beauchamp Seymour, 1st Baron Alcester, Second Naval Lord
  - Thomas Brandreth, Third Lord
  - Sir Frederick Richards, Junior Naval Lord
  - William Sproston Caine, Civil Lord
  - George Wightwick Rendel, Civil Lord
- 25 May 1885: Commission
  - Thomas Baring, 1st Earl of Northbrook, First Lord
  - Sir Astley Cooper Key, First Naval Lord
  - Beauchamp Seymour, 1st Baron Alcester, Second Naval Lord
  - Sir William Hewett, Junior Naval Lord
  - Thomas Brandreth, Third Lord
  - William Sproston Caine, Civil Lord
  - George Wightwick Rendel, Civil Lord
- 1 July 1885: Commission
  - Lord George Hamilton, First Lord
  - Arthur Acland Hood, First Naval Lord
  - Sir Anthony Hoskins, Second Naval Lord
  - Thomas Brandreth, Third Lord
  - William Codrington, Junior Naval Lord
  - Ellis Ashmead-Bartlett, Civil Lord
- 15 February 1886: Commission
  - George Robinson, 1st Marquess of Ripon, First Lord
  - Lord John Hay, First Naval Lord
  - Sir Anthony Hoskins, Second Naval Lord
  - William Graham, Third Lord
  - James Erskine, Junior Naval Lord
  - Robert Duff, Civil Lord
- 9 August 1886: Commission
  - Lord George Hamilton, First Lord
  - Sir Arthur Acland Hood, First Naval Lord
  - Sir Anthony Hoskins, Second Naval Lord
  - William Graham, Third Lord
  - Lord Charles Beresford, Junior Naval Lord
  - Ellis Ashmead-Bartlett, Civil Lord
- 30 January 1888: Commission
  - Lord George Hamilton, First Lord
  - Sir Arthur Acland Hood, First Naval Lord
  - Sir Anthony Hoskins, Second Naval Lord
  - William Graham, Third Lord
  - Charles Frederick Hotham, Junior Naval Lord
  - Ellis Ashmead-Bartlett, Civil Lord
- 30 July 1888: Commission
  - Lord George Hamilton, First Lord
  - Sir Arthur Acland Hood, First Naval Lord
  - Sir Anthony Hoskins, Second Naval Lord
  - John Hopkins, Third Lord
  - Charles Frederick Hotham, Junior Naval Lord
  - Ellis Ashmead-Bartlett, Civil Lord
- 24 October 1889: Commission
  - Lord George Hamilton, First Lord
  - Sir Richard Vesey Hamilton, First Naval Lord
  - Henry Fairfax, Second Naval Lord
  - John Hopkins, Third Lord
  - Charles Frederick Hotham, Junior Naval Lord
  - Ellis Ashmead-Bartlett, Civil Lord
- 16 December 1889: Commission
  - Lord George Hamilton, First Lord
  - Sir Richard Vesey Hamilton, First Naval Lord
  - Henry Fairfax, Second Naval Lord
  - John Hopkins, Third Lord
  - Frederick Bedford, Junior Naval Lord
  - Ellis Ashmead-Bartlett, Civil Lord
- 28 September 1891: Commission
  - Lord George Hamilton, First Lord
  - Sir Anthony Hoskins, First Naval Lord
  - Henry Fairfax, Second Naval Lord
  - John Hopkins, Third Lord
  - Frederick Bedford, Junior Naval Lord
  - Ellis Ashmead-Bartlett, Civil Lord
- 1 February 1892: Commission
  - Lord George Hamilton, First Lord
  - Sir Anthony Hoskins, First Naval Lord
  - Henry Fairfax, Second Naval Lord
  - John Fisher, Third Lord
  - Frederick Bedford, Junior Naval Lord
  - Ellis Ashmead-Bartlett, Civil Lord
- 25 August 1892: Commission
  - John Spencer, 5th Earl Spencer, First Lord
  - Sir Anthony Hoskins, First Naval Lord
  - Sir Frederick Richards, Second Naval Lord
  - John Fisher, Third Lord
  - Lord Walter Kerr, Junior Naval Lord
  - Edmund Robertson, Civil Lord
- 1 November 1893: Commission
  - John Spencer, 5th Earl Spencer, First Lord
  - Sir Frederick Richards First Naval Lord
  - Lord Walter Kerr, Second Naval Lord
  - John Fisher, Third Lord
  - Gerard Noel, Junior Naval Lord
  - Edmund Robertson, Civil Lord
- 6 May 1895: Commission
  - John Spencer, 5th Earl Spencer, First Lord
  - Sir Frederick Richards, First Naval Lord
  - Sir Frederick Bedford, Second Naval Lord
  - John Fisher, Third Lord
  - Gerard Noel, Junior Naval Lord
  - Edmund Robertson, Civil Lord
- 6 July 1895: Commission
  - George Goschen, First Lord
  - Sir Frederick Richards, First Naval Lord
  - Sir Frederick Bedford, Second Naval Lord
  - John Fisher, Third Lord
  - Gerard Noel, Junior Naval Lord
  - Austen Chamberlain, Civil Lord
- August 1897
  - George Goschen, First Lord
  - Sir Frederick Richards, First Naval Lord
  - Sir Frederick Bedford, Second Naval Lord
  - Arthur Knyvet Wilson, Third Lord
  - Gerard Noel, Junior Naval Lord
  - Austen Chamberlain, Civil Lord
- 1898
  - George Goschen, First Lord
  - Sir Frederick Richards, First Naval Lord
  - Sir Frederick Bedford, Second Naval Lord
  - Arthur Knyvet Wilson, Third Lord
  - Arthur William Moore, Junior Naval Lord
  - Austen Chamberlain, Civil Lord
- May 1899
  - George Goschen, First Lord
  - Sir Frederick Richards, First Naval Lord
  - Lord Walter Kerr, Second Naval Lord
  - Arthur Knyvet Wilson, Third Lord
  - Arthur William Moore, Junior Naval Lord
  - Austen Chamberlain, Civil Lord
- August 1899
  - George Goschen, First Lord
  - Lord Walter Kerr, First Naval Lord
  - Archibald Lucius Douglas, Second Naval Lord
  - Arthur Knyvet Wilson, Third Lord
  - Arthur William Moore, Junior Naval Lord
  - Austen Chamberlain, Civil Lord
- 12 November 1900
  - William Palmer, 2nd Earl of Selborne, First Lord
  - Lord Walter Kerr, First Naval Lord
  - Archibald Lucius Douglas, Second Naval Lord
  - Arthur Knyvet Wilson, Third Lord
  - Arthur William Moore, Junior Naval Lord
  - Ernest George Pretyman, Civil Lord
- 1901
  - William Palmer, 2nd Earl of Selborne, First Lord
  - Lord Walter Kerr, First Naval Lord
  - Archibald Lucius Douglas, Second Naval Lord
  - Arthur Knyvet Wilson, Third Lord
  - John Durnford, Junior Naval Lord
  - Ernest George Pretyman, Civil Lord

== 1901 to 1921 ==
- June 1902
  - William Palmer, 2nd Earl of Selborne, First Lord
  - Lord Walter Kerr, First Naval Lord
  - Sir John Fisher, Second Naval Lord
  - Arthur Knyvet Wilson, Third Lord
  - John Durnford, Junior Naval Lord
  - Ernest George Pretyman, Civil Lord
- 13 October 1903: Commission
  - William Palmer, 2nd Earl of Selborne, First Lord
  - Lord Walter Kerr, First Naval Lord
  - Sir Charles Carter Drury, Second Naval Lord
  - William Henry May, Third Lord
  - John Durnford, Junior Naval Lord
  - Arthur Lee, Civil Lord
- 1 December 1903: Commission
  - William Palmer, 2nd Earl of Selborne, First Lord
  - Lord Walter Kerr, First Naval Lord
  - Sir Charles Carter Drury, Second Naval Lord
  - William Henry May, Third Lord
  - Frederick Inglefield, Junior Naval Lord
  - Arthur Lee, Civil Lord
- 21 October 1904
  - William Palmer, 2nd Earl of Selborne, First Lord
  - Sir John Fisher, First Sea Lord
  - Sir Charles Carter Drury, Second Sea Lord
  - William Henry May, Third Sea Lord
  - Frederick Inglefield, Fourth Sea Lord
  - Arthur Lee, Civil Lord
- February 1905
  - William Palmer, 2nd Earl of Selborne, First Lord
  - Sir John Fisher, First Sea Lord
  - Sir Charles Carter Drury, Second Sea Lord
  - Henry Bradwardine Jackson, Third Sea Lord
  - Frederick Inglefield, Fourth Sea Lord
  - Arthur Lee, Civil Lord
- 27 March 1905
  - Frederick Campbell, 3rd Earl Cawdor, First Lord
  - Sir John Fisher, First Sea Lord
  - Sir Charles Carter Drury, Second Sea Lord
  - Henry Bradwardine Jackson, Third Sea Lord
  - Frederick Inglefield, Fourth Sea Lord
  - Arthur Lee, Civil Lord
- 22 December 1905: Commission
  - Edward Marjoribanks, 2nd Baron Tweedmouth, First Lord
  - Sir John Fisher, First Sea Lord
  - Sir Charles Carter Drury, Second Sea Lord
  - Henry Bradwardine Jackson, Third Sea Lord
  - Frederick Inglefield, Fourth Sea Lord
  - George Lambert, Civil Lord
- 20 March 1907: Commission
  - Edward Marjoribanks, 2nd Baron Tweedmouth, First Lord
  - Sir John Fisher, First Sea Lord
  - Sir illiam Henry May, Second Sea Lord
  - Henry Bradwardine Jackson, Third Sea Lord
  - Alfred Winsloe, Fourth Sea Lord
  - George Lambert, Civil Lord
- 16 April 1908: Commission
  - Reginald McKenna, First Lord
  - Sir John Fisher, First Sea Lord
  - Sir William Henry May, Second Sea Lord
  - Henry Bradwardine Jackson, Third Sea Lord
  - Alfred Winsloe, Fourth Sea Lord
  - George Lambert, Civil Lord
- 16 October 1908: Commission
  - Reginald McKenna, First Lord
  - Sir John Fisher, First Sea Lord
  - Sir William Henry May, Second Sea Lord
  - Sir John Jellicoe, Third Sea Lord
  - Alfred Winsloe, Fourth Sea Lord
  - George Lambert, Civil Lord
- 25 March 1909: Commission
  - Reginald McKenna, First Lord
  - Sir John Fisher, First Sea Lord
  - Sir Francis Bridgeman, Second Sea Lord
  - Sir John Jellicoe, Third Sea Lord
  - Alfred Winsloe, Fourth Sea Lord
  - George Lambert, Civil Lord
- 25 January 1910: Commission
  - Reginald McKenna, First Lord
  - Sir Arthur Knyvet Wilson, First Sea Lord
  - Sir Francis Bridgeman, Second Sea Lord
  - Sir John Jellicoe, Third Sea Lord
  - Charles Madden, Fourth Sea Lord
  - George Lambert, Civil Lord
- 20 December 1910: Commission
  - Reginald McKenna, First Lord
  - Sir Arthur Knyvet Wilson, First Sea Lord
  - Sir Francis Bridgeman, Second Sea Lord
  - Charles Briggs, Third Sea Lord
  - Charles Madden, Fourth Sea Lord
  - George Lambert, Civil Lord
- 25 March 1911: Commission
  - Reginald McKenna, First Lord
  - Sir Arthur Knyvet Wilson, First Sea Lord
  - Sir George Egerton, Second Sea Lord
  - Charles Briggs, Third Sea Lord
  - Charles Madden, Fourth Sea Lord
  - George Lambert, Civil Lord
- 24 October 1911: Commission
  - Winston Churchill, First Lord
  - Sir Arthur Knyvet Wilson, First Sea Lord
  - Sir George Egerton, Second Sea Lord
  - Charles Briggs, Third Sea Lord
  - Charles Madden, Fourth Sea Lord
  - George Lambert, Civil Lord
- 5 December 1911: Commission
  - Winston Churchill, First Lord
  - Sir Francis Bridgeman, First Sea Lord
  - Prince Louis of Battenberg, Second Sea Lord
  - Charles Briggs, Third Sea Lord
  - William Christopher Pakenham, Fourth Sea Lord
  - George Lambert, Civil Lord
- 18 January 1912: Commission
  - Winston Churchill, First Lord
  - Sir Francis Bridgeman, First Sea Lord
  - Prince Louis of Battenberg, Second Sea Lord
  - Charles Briggs, Third Sea Lord
  - William Christopher Pakenham, Fourth Sea Lord
  - George Lambert, Civil Lord
  - Sir Francis Hopwood, Civil Lord
- 29 May 1912: Commission
  - Winston Churchill, First Lord
  - Sir Francis Bridgeman, First Sea Lord
  - Prince Louis of Battenberg, Second Sea Lord
  - Gordon Moore, Third Sea Lord
  - William Christopher Pakenham, Fourth Sea Lord
  - George Lambert, Civil Lord
  - Sir Francis Hopwood, Civil Lord
- 9 December 1912: Commission
  - Winston Churchill, First Lord
  - Prince Louis of Battenberg, First Sea Lord
  - Sir John Jellicoe, Second Sea Lord
  - Gordon Moore, Third Sea Lord
  - William Christopher Pakenham, Fourth Sea Lord
  - George Lambert, Civil Lord
  - Sir Francis Hopwood, Civil Lord
- 1 December 1913: Commission
  - Winston Churchill, First Lord
  - Prince Louis of Battenberg, First Sea Lord
  - Sir John Jellicoe, Second Sea Lord
  - Gordon Moore, Third Sea Lord
  - Cecil Lambert, Fourth Sea Lord
  - George Lambert, Civil Lord
  - Sir Francis Hopwood, Civil Lord
- 30 July 1914: Commission
  - Winston Churchill, First Lord
  - Prince Louis of Battenberg, First Sea Lord
  - Sir Frederick Hamilton, Second Sea Lord
  - Gordon Moore, Third Sea Lord
  - Cecil Lambert, Fourth Sea Lord
  - George Lambert, Civil Lord
  - Sir Francis Hopwood, Civil Lord
- September 1914
  - Winston Churchill, First Lord
  - Prince Louis of Battenberg, First Sea Lord
  - Sir Frederick Hamilton, Second Sea Lord
  - Frederick Tudor, Third Sea Lord
  - Cecil Lambert, Fourth Sea Lord
  - George Lambert, Civil Lord
  - Sir Francis Hopwood, Civil Lord
- 30 October 1914: Commission
  - Winston Churchill, First Lord
  - John Fisher, 1st Baron Fisher, First Sea Lord
  - Sir Frederick Hamilton, Second Sea Lord
  - Frederick Tudor, Third Sea Lord
  - Cecil Lambert, Fourth Sea Lord
  - George Lambert, Civil Lord
  - Sir Francis Hopwood, Civil Lord
- 28 May 1915: Commission
  - Arthur Balfour, First Lord
  - Sir Henry Bradwardine Jackson, First Sea Lord
  - Sir Frederick Hamilton, Second Sea Lord
  - Frederick Tudor, Third Sea Lord
  - Cecil Lambert, Fourth Sea Lord
  - Sir Francis Hopwood, Civil Lord
- 3 June 1915: Commission
  - Arthur Balfour, First Lord
  - Sir Henry Bradwardine Jackson, First Sea Lord
- Sir Frederick Hamilton, Second Sea Lord
  - Frederick Tudor, Third Sea Lord
  - Cecil Lambert, Fourth Sea Lord
  - Victor Cavendish, 9th Duke of Devonshire, Civil Lord
  - Sir Francis Hopwood, Civil Lord
- 1 July 1916: Commission
  - Arthur Balfour, First Lord
  - Sir Henry Bradwardine Jackson, First Sea Lord
  - Sir Somerset Gough-Calthorpe, Second Sea Lord
  - Frederick Tudor, Third Sea Lord
  - Cecil Lambert, Fourth Sea Lord
  - Victor Cavendish, 9th Duke of Devonshire, Civil Lord
  - Sir Francis Hopwood, Civil Lord
- 31 August 1916: Commission
  - Arthur Balfour, First Lord
  - Sir Henry Bradwardine Jackson, First Sea Lord
  - Sir Somerset Gough-Calthorpe, Second Sea Lord
  - Frederick Tudor, Third Sea Lord
  - Cecil Lambert, Fourth Sea Lord
  - Victor Bulwer-Lytton, 2nd Earl of Lytton, Civil Lord
  - Sir Francis Hopwood, Civil Lord
- 4 December 1916: Commission
  - Arthur Balfour, First Lord
  - Sir John Jellicoe, First Sea Lord
  - Sir Cecil Burney, Second Sea Lord
  - Frederick Tudor, Third Sea Lord
  - Lionel Halsey, Fourth Sea Lord
  - Victor Bulwer-Lytton, 2nd Earl of Lytton, Civil Lord
  - Sir Francis Hopwood, Civil Lord
- 11 December 1916: Commission
  - Sir Edward Carson, First Lord
  - Sir John Jellicoe, First Sea Lord
  - Sir Cecil Burney, Second Sea Lord
  - Frederick Tudor, Third Sea Lord
  - Lionel Halsey, Fourth Sea Lord
  - Ernest George Pretyman, Civil Lord
  - Sir Francis Hopwood, Civil Lord
- 11 January 1917: Commission
  - Sir Edward Carson, First Lord
  - Sir John Jellicoe, First Sea Lord
  - Sir Cecil Burney, Second Sea Lord
  - Frederick Tudor, Third Sea Lord
  - Lionel Halsey, Fourth Sea Lord
  - Godfrey Paine, Fifth Sea Lord
  - Ernest George Pretyman, Civil Lord
  - Sir Francis Hopwood, Civil Lord
- 31 May 1917: Commission
  - Sir Edward Carson, First Lord
  - Sir John Jellicoe, First Sea Lord
  - Sir Cecil Burney, Second Sea Lord
  - Lionel Halsey, Third Sea Lord
  - Hugh Tothill, Fourth Sea Lord
  - Godfrey Paine, Fifth Sea Lord
  - Sir Henry Oliver, Deputy Chief of Naval Staff
  - Alexander Duff, Assistant Chief of Naval Staff
  - Ernest George Pretyman, Civil Lord
  - Sir Eric Geddes, Controller
  - Sir Francis Hopwood, Civil Lord
- 6 September 1917: Commission
  - Sir Eric Geddes, First Lord
  - Sir John Jellicoe, First Sea Lord
  - Sir Rosslyn Wemyss, Second Sea Lord
  - Lionel Halsey, Third Sea Lord
  - Hugh Tothill, Fourth Sea Lord
  - Godfrey Paine, Fifth Sea Lord
  - Sir Henry Oliver, Deputy Chief of Naval Staff
  - Alexander Duff, Assistant Chief of Naval Staff
  - Ernest George Pretyman, Civil Lord
  - Sir Alan Anderson, Controller
- 27 September 1917: Commission
  - Sir Eric Geddes, First Lord
  - Sir John Jellicoe, First Sea Lord
  - Sir Rosslyn Wemyss, Deputy First Sea Lord
  - Sir Herbert Heath, Second Sea Lord
  - Lionel Halsey, Third Sea Lord
  - Hugh Tothill, Fourth Sea Lord
  - Godfrey Paine, Fifth Sea Lord
  - Sir Henry Oliver, Deputy Chief of Naval Staff
  - Alexander Duff, Assistant Chief of Naval Staff
  - Ernest George Pretyman, Civil Lord
  - Sir Alan Anderson, Controller
- 10 January 1918: Commission
  - Sir Eric Geddes, First Lord
  - Sir Rosslyn Wemyss, First Sea Lord
  - George Price Webley Hope, Deputy First Sea Lord
  - Sir Herbert Heath, Second Sea Lord
  - Lionel Halsey, Third Sea Lord
  - Hugh Tothill, Fourth Sea Lord
  - Sydney Fremantle, Deputy Chief of Naval Staff
  - Sir Alexander Duff, Assistant Chief of Naval Staff
  - Ernest George Pretyman, Civil Lord
  - Sir Alan Anderson, Controller
  - Arthur Francis Pease, Civil Lord
- 10 June 1918: Commission
  - Sir Eric Geddes, First Lord
  - Sir Rosslyn Wemyss, First Sea Lord
  - George Hope, Deputy First Sea Lord
  - Sir Herbert Heath, Second Sea Lord
  - Charles de Bartolomé, Third Sea Lord
  - Hugh Tothill, Fourth Sea Lord
  - Sydney Fremantle, Deputy Chief of Naval Staff
  - Sir Alexander Duff, Assistant Chief of Naval Staff
  - Ernest George Pretyman, Civil Lord
  - Arthur Francis Pease, Civil Lord
  - Sir Robert Horne, Civil Lord
- 24 December 1918: Commission
  - Sir Eric Geddes, First Lord
  - Sir Rosslyn Wemyss, First Sea Lord
  - George Hope, Deputy First Sea Lord
  - Sir Herbert Heath, Second Sea Lord
  - Charles de Bartolomé, Third Sea Lord
  - Hugh Tothill, Fourth Sea Lord
  - Sydney Fremantle, Deputy Chief of Naval Staff
  - Sir Alexander Duff, Assistant Chief of Naval Staff
  - Ernest George Pretyman, Civil Lord
  - Arthur Francis Pease, Civil Lord
  - Sir Robert Horne, Civil Lord
  - Victor Bulwer-Lytton, 2nd Earl of Lytton, Civil Lord
- 16 January 1919: Commission
  - Walter Long, First Lord
  - Sir Rosslyn Wemyss, First Sea Lord
  - George Hope, Deputy First Sea Lord
  - Sir Herbert Heath, Second Sea Lord
  - Charles de Bartolomé, Third Sea Lord
  - Sir Hugh Tothill, Fourth Sea Lord
  - Sydney Fremantle, Deputy Chief of Naval Staff
  - Sir Alexander Duff, Assistant Chief of Naval Staff
  - Arthur Francis Pease, Civil Lord
- 30 January 1919: Commission
  - Walter Long, First Lord
  - Sir Rosslyn Wemyss, First Sea Lord
  - George Hope, Deputy First Sea Lord
  - Sir Herbert Heath, Second Sea Lord
  - Charles de Bartolomé, Third Sea Lord
  - Sir Hugh Tothill, Fourth Sea Lord
  - Sydney Fremantle, Deputy Chief of Naval Staff
  - Sir Alexander Duff, Assistant Chief of Naval Staff
  - Victor Bulwer-Lytton, 2nd Earl of Lytton, Civil Lord
  - Arthur Francis Pease, Civil Lord
- 1 May 1919: Commission
  - Walter Long, First Lord
  - Sir Rosslyn Wemyss, First Sea Lord
  - George Hope, Deputy First Sea Lord
  - Sir Montague Browning, Second Sea Lord
  - Charles de Bartolomé, Third Sea Lord
  - Sir Hugh Tothill, Fourth Sea Lord
  - James Fergusson, Deputy Chief of Naval Staff
  - Sir Alexander Duff, Assistant Chief of Naval Staff
  - Victor Bulwer-Lytton, 2nd Earl of Lytton, Civil Lord
- 2 July 1919: Commission
  - Walter Long, First Lord
  - Sir Rosslyn Wemyss, First Sea Lord
  - George Hope, Deputy First Sea Lord
  - Sir Montague Browning, Second Sea Lord
  - Sir William Nicholson, Third Sea Lord
  - Sir Ernle Chatfield, Fourth Sea Lord
  - James Fergusson, Deputy Chief of Naval Staff
  - Sir Alexander Duff, Assistant Chief of Naval Staff
  - Victor Bulwer-Lytton, 2nd Earl of Lytton, Civil Lord
- 4 August 1919: Commission
  - Walter Long, First Lord
  - Sir Rosslyn Wemyss, First Sea Lord
  - Sir Montague Browning, Second Sea Lord
  - Sir William Nicholson, Third Sea Lord
  - Sir Ernle Chatfield, Fourth Sea Lord
  - Sir Osmond Brock, Deputy Chief of Naval Staff
  - James Fergusson, Assistant Chief of Naval Staff
  - Victor Bulwer-Lytton, 2nd Earl of Lytton, Civil Lord
- 1 November 1919: Commission
  - Walter Long, First Lord
  - David Beatty, 1st Earl Beatty, First Sea Lord
  - Sir Montague Browning, Second Sea Lord
  - Sir William Nicholson, Third Sea Lord
  - Sir Ernle Chatfield, Fourth Sea Lord
  - Sir Osmond Brock, Deputy Chief of Naval Staff
  - James Fergusson, Assistant Chief of Naval Staff
  - Victor Bulwer-Lytton, 2nd Earl of Lytton, Civil Lord
- 15 March 1920: Commission
  - Walter Long, First Lord
  - David Beatty, 1st Earl Beatty, First Sea Lord
  - Sir Montague Browning, Second Sea Lord
  - Sir William Nicholson, Third Sea Lord
  - Algernon Boyle, Fourth Sea Lord
  - Sir Osmond Brock, Deputy Chief of Naval Staff
  - Sir Ernle Chatfield, Assistant Chief of Naval Staff
  - Victor Bulwer-Lytton, 2nd Earl of Lytton, Civil Lord
- 15 April 1920: Commission
  - Walter Long, First Lord
  - David Beatty, 1st Earl Beatty, First Sea Lord
  - Sir Montague Browning, Second Sea Lord
  - Frederick Laurence Field, Third Sea Lord
  - Algernon Boyle, Fourth Sea Lord
  - Sir Osmond Brock, Deputy Chief of Naval Staff
  - Sir Ernle Chatfield, Assistant Chief of Naval Staff
  - Victor Bulwer-Lytton, 2nd Earl of Lytton, Civil Lord
- 30 September 1920: Commission
  - Walter Long, First Lord
  - David Beatty, 1st Earl Beatty, First Sea Lord
  - Sir Henry Oliver, Second Sea Lord
  - Frederick Laurence Field, Third Sea Lord
  - Algernon Boyle, Fourth Sea Lord
  - Sir Osmond Brock, Deputy Chief of Naval Staff
  - Sir Ernle Chatfield, Assistant Chief of Naval Staff
  - Victor Bulwer-Lytton, 2nd Earl of Lytton, Civil Lord
- 4 November 1920: Commission
  - Walter Long, First Lord
  - David Beatty, 1st Earl Beatty First Sea Lord
  - Sir Henry Oliver, Second Sea Lord
  - Frederick Laurence Field, Third Sea Lord
  - Algernon Boyle, Fourth Sea Lord
  - Sir Osmond Brock, Deputy Chief of Naval Staff
  - Sir Ernle Chatfield, Assistant Chief of Naval Staff
  - Richard Onslow, 5th Earl of Onslow, Civil Lord
- 18 February 1921: Commission
  - Arthur Lee, 1st Viscount Lee of Fareham, First Lord
  - David Beatty, 1st Earl Beatty, First Sea Lord
  - Sir Henry Oliver, Second Sea Lord
  - Frederick Laurence Field, Third Sea Lord
  - Algernon Boyle, Fourth Sea Lord
  - Sir Osmond Brock, Deputy Chief of Naval Staff
  - Sir Ernle Chatfield, Assistant Chief of Naval Staff
  - Richard Onslow, 5th Earl of Onslow, Civil Lord
- 1 November 1921: Commission
  - Arthur Lee, 1st Viscount Lee of Fareham, First Lord
  - David Beatty, 1st Earl Beatty, First Sea Lord
  - Sir Henry Oliver, Second Sea Lord
  - Frederick Laurence Field, Third Sea Lord
  - Algernon Boyle, Fourth Sea Lord
  - Sir Roger Keyes, 1st Baronet, Deputy Chief of Naval Staff
  - Sir Ernle Chatfield, Assistant Chief of Naval Staff
  - Bolton Eyres-Monsell, Civil Lord

== 1921 to 1941 ==
- 31 October 1922: Commission
  - Leo Amery, First Lord
  - David Beatty, 1st Earl Beatty, First Sea Lord
  - Sir Henry Oliver, Second Sea Lord
  - Frederick Laurence Field, Third Sea Lord
  - Algernon Boyle, Fourth Sea Lord
  - Sir Roger Keyes, 1st Baronet, Deputy Chief of Naval Staff
  - Sir Ernle Chatfield, Assistant Chief of Naval Staff
  - Bolton Eyres-Monsell, Civil Lord
- 2 November 1922: Commission
  - Leo Amery, First Lord
  - David Beatty, 1st Earl Beatty, First Sea Lord
  - Sir Henry Oliver, Second Sea Lord
  - Frederick Laurence Field, Third Sea Lord
  - Algernon Boyle, Fourth Sea Lord
  - Sir Roger Keyes, 1st Baronet, Deputy Chief of Naval Staff
  - Sir Ernle Chatfield, Assistant Chief of Naval Staff
  - Victor Hope, 2nd Marquess of Linlithgow, Civil Lord
- 1 December 1922: Commission
  - Leo Amery, First Lord
  - David Beatty, 1st Earl Beatty, First Sea Lord
  - Sir Henry Oliver, Second Sea Lord
  - Frederick Laurence Field, Third Sea Lord
  - Algernon Boyle, Fourth Sea Lord
  - Sir Roger Keyes, 1st Baronet, Deputy Chief of Naval Staff
  - Cyril Fuller, Assistant Chief of Naval Staff
  - Victor Hope, 2nd Marquess of Linlithgow, Civil Lord
- 15 May 1923: Commission
  - Leo Amery, First Lord
  - David Beatty, 1st Earl Beatty, First Sea Lord
  - Sir Henry Oliver, Second Sea Lord
  - Cyril Fuller, Third Sea Lord
  - Algernon Boyle, Fourth Sea Lord
  - Sir Roger Keyes, 1st Baronet, Deputy Chief of Naval Staff
  - Arthur Waistell, Assistant Chief of Naval Staff
  - Victor Hope, 2nd Marquess of Linlithgow, Civil Lord
- 28 January 1924: Commission
  - Frederic Thesiger, 1st Viscount Chelmsford, First Lord
  - David Beatty, 1st Earl Beatty, First Sea Lord
  - Sir Henry Oliver, Second Sea Lord
  - Cyril Fuller, Third Sea Lord
  - Algernon Boyle, Fourth Sea Lord
  - Sir Roger Keyes, 1st Baronet, Deputy Chief of Naval Staff
  - Arthur Waistell, Assistant Chief of Naval Staff
  - Frank Hodges, Civil Lord
- 1 April 1924: Commission
  - Frederic Thesiger, 1st Viscount Chelmsford, First Lord
  - David Beatty, 1st Earl Beatty, First Sea Lord
  - Sir Henry Oliver, Second Sea Lord
  - Cyril Fuller, Third Sea Lord
  - John Donald Kelly, Fourth Sea Lord
  - Sir Roger Keyes, 1st Baronet, Deputy Chief of Naval Staff
  - Arthur Waistell, Assistant Chief of Naval Staff
  - Frank Hodges, Civil Lord
- 15 August 1924: Commission
  - Frederic Thesiger, 1st Viscount Chelmsford, First Lord
  - David Beatty, 1st Earl Beatty, First Sea Lord
  - Sir Michael Culme-Seymour, 3rd Baronet, Second Sea Lord
  - Cyril Fuller, Third Sea Lord
  - John Donald Kelly, Fourth Sea Lord
  - Sir Roger Keyes, 1st Baronet, Deputy Chief of Naval Staff
  - Arthur Waistell, Assistant Chief of Naval Staff
  - Frank Hodges, Civil Lord
- 7 November 1924: Commission
  - William Clive Bridgeman, First Lord
  - David Beatty, 1st Earl Beatty, First Sea Lord
  - Sir Michael Culme-Seymour, 3rd Baronet, Second Sea Lord
  - Cyril Fuller, Third Sea Lord
  - John Donald Kelly, Fourth Sea Lord
  - Sir Roger Keyes, 1st Baronet, Deputy Chief of Naval Staff
  - Frederic Charles Dreyer, Assistant Chief of Naval Staff
- 18 November 1924: Commission
  - William Clive Bridgeman, First Lord
  - David Beatty, 1st Earl Beatty, First Sea Lord
  - Sir Michael Culme-Seymour, 3rd Baronet, Second Sea Lord
  - Cyril Fuller, Third Sea Lord
  - John Donald Kelly, Fourth Sea Lord
  - Sir Roger Keyes, 1st Baronet, Deputy Chief of Naval Staff
  - Frederic Charles Dreyer, Assistant Chief of Naval Staff
  - James Stanhope, 7th Earl Stanhope, Civil Lord
- 22 April 1925: Commission
  - William Clive Bridgeman, First Lord
  - David Beatty, 1st Earl Beatty, First Sea Lord
  - Sir Hubert Brand, Second Sea Lord
  - Cyril Fuller, Third Sea Lord
  - John Donald Kelly, Fourth Sea Lord
  - Sir Roger Keyes, 1st Baronet, Deputy Chief of Naval Staff
  - Frederic Charles Dreyer, Assistant Chief of Naval Staff
  - James Stanhope, 7th Earl Stanhope, Civil Lord
- 30 April 1925: Commission
  - William Clive Bridgeman, First Lord
  - David Beatty, 1st Earl Beatty, First Sea Lord
  - Sir Hubert Brand, Second Sea Lord
  - Sir Ernle Chatfield, Third Sea Lord
  - John Donald Kelly, Fourth Sea Lord
  - Sir Roger Keyes, 1st Baronet, Deputy Chief of Naval Staff
  - Frederic Charles Dreyer, Assistant Chief of Naval Staff
  - James Stanhope, 7th Earl Stanhope, Civil Lord
- 15 May 1925: Commission
  - William Clive Bridgeman, First Lord
  - David Beatty, 1st Earl Beatty, First Sea Lord
  - Sir Hubert Brand, Second Sea Lord
  - Sir Ernle Chatfield, Third Sea Lord
  - John Donald Kelly, Fourth Sea Lord
  - Sir Frederick Field, Deputy Chief of Naval Staff
  - Frederic Charles Dreyer, Assistant Chief of Naval Staff
  - James Stanhope, 7th Earl Stanhope, Civil Lord
- 21 April 1927: Commission
  - William Clive Bridgeman, First Lord
  - David Beatty, 1st Earl Beatty, First Sea Lord
  - Sir Hubert Brand, Second Sea Lord
  - Sir Ernle Chatfield, Third Sea Lord
  - John Donald Kelly, Fourth Sea Lord
  - Sir Frederick Field, Deputy Chief of Naval Staff
  - Dudley Pound, Assistant Chief of Naval Staff
  - James Stanhope, 7th Earl Stanhope, Civil Lord
- 30 April 1927: Commission
  - William Clive Bridgeman, First Lord
  - David Beatty, 1st Earl Beatty, First Sea Lord
  - William Wordsworth Fisher, Second Sea Lord
  - Sir Ernle Chatfield, Third Sea Lord
  - John Donald Kelly, Fourth Sea Lord
  - Sir Frederick Field, Deputy Chief of Naval Staff
  - Dudley Pound, Assistant Chief of Naval Staff
  - James Stanhope, 7th Earl Stanhope, Civil Lord
- 30 July 1927: Commission
  - William Clive Bridgeman, First Lord
  - Sir Charles Madden, 1st Baronet, First Sea Lord
  - Sir Hubert Brand, Second Sea Lord
  - Sir Ernle Chatfield, Third Sea Lord
  - William Wordsworth Fisher, Fourth Sea Lord
  - Sir Frederick Field, Deputy Chief of Naval Staff
  - Dudley Pound, Assistant Chief of Naval Staff
  - James Stanhope, 7th Earl Stanhope, Civil Lord
- 15 August 1927: Commission
  - William Clive Bridgeman, First Lord
  - Sir Charles Madden, 1st Baronet, First Sea Lord
  - Sir Michael Hodges, Second Sea Lord
  - Sir Ernle Chatfield, Third Sea Lord
  - William Wordsworth Fisher, Fourth Sea Lord
  - Sir Frederick Field, Deputy Chief of Naval Staff
  - Dudley Pound, Assistant Chief of Naval Staff
  - James Stanhope, 7th Earl Stanhope, Civil Lord
- 2 April 1928: Commission
  - William Clive Bridgeman, First Lord
  - Sir Charles Madden, 1st Baronet, First Sea Lord
  - Sir Michael Hodges, Second Sea Lord
  - Sir Ernle Chatfield, Third Sea Lord
  - Vernon Haggard, Fourth Sea Lord
  - Sir Frederick Field, Deputy Chief of Naval Staff
  - Dudley Pound, Assistant Chief of Naval Staff
  - James Stanhope, 7th Earl Stanhope, Civil Lord
- 1 May 1928: Commission
  - William Clive Bridgeman, First Lord
  - Sir Charles Madden, 1st Baronet, First Sea Lord
  - Sir Michael Hodges, Second Sea Lord
  - Sir Ernle Chatfield, Third Sea Lord
  - Vernon Haggard, Fourth Sea Lord
  - William Wordsworth Fisher, Deputy Chief of Naval Staff
  - Dudley Pound, Assistant Chief of Naval Staff
  - James Stanhope, 7th Earl Stanhope, Civil Lord
- 1 November 1928: Commission
  - William Clive Bridgeman, First Lord
  - Sir Charles Madden, 1st Baronet, First Sea Lord
  - Sir Michael Hodges, Second Sea Lord
  - Roger Backhouse, Third Sea Lord
  - Vernon Haggard, Fourth Sea Lord
  - William Wordsworth Fisher, Deputy Chief of Naval Staff
  - Dudley Pound, Assistant Chief of Naval Staff
  - James Stanhope, 7th Earl Stanhope, Civil Lord
- 22 April 1929: Commission
  - William Clive Bridgeman, First Lord
  - Sir Charles Madden, 1st Baronet, First Sea Lord
  - Sir Michael Hodges, Second Sea Lord
  - Roger Backhouse, Third Sea Lord
  - Vernon Haggard, Fourth Sea Lord
  - William Wordsworth Fisher, Deputy Chief of Naval Staff
  - James Stanhope, 7th Earl Stanhope, Civil Lord
- 10 June 1929: Commission
  - A. V. Alexander, First Lord
  - Sir Charles Madden, 1st Baronet, First Sea Lord
  - Sir Michael Hodges, Second Sea Lord
  - Roger Backhouse, Third Sea Lord
  - Vernon Haggard, Fourth Sea Lord
  - William Wordsworth Fisher, Deputy Chief of Naval Staff
  - George Hall, Civil Lord
- 21 April 1930: Commission
  - A. V. Alexander, First Lord
  - Sir Charles Madden, 1st Baronet, First Sea Lord
  - Sir Michael Hodges, Second Sea Lord
  - Roger Backhouse, Third Sea Lord
  - Lionel Preston, Fourth Sea Lord
  - Sir William Wordsworth Fisher, Deputy Chief of Naval Staff
  - Charles Ammon, Parliamentary and Financial Secretary to the Admiralty
  - George Hall, Civil Lord
- 26 May 1930: Commission
  - A. V. Alexander, First Lord
  - Sir Charles Madden, 1st Baronet, First Sea Lord
  - Sir Cyril Fuller, Second Sea Lord
  - Roger Backhouse, Third Sea Lord
  - Lionel Preston, Fourth Sea Lord
  - Sir William Wordsworth Fisher, Deputy Chief of Naval Staff
  - Charles Ammon, Parliamentary and Financial Secretary to the Admiralty
  - George Hall, Civil Lord
- 30 June 1930: Commission
  - A. V. Alexander, First Lord
  - Sir Charles Madden, 1st Baronet, First Sea Lord
  - Sir Cyril Fuller, Second Sea Lord
  - Roger Backhouse, Third Sea Lord
  - Lionel Preston, Fourth Sea Lord
  - Frederic Dreyer, Deputy Chief of Naval Staff
  - Charles Ammon, Parliamentary and Financial Secretary to the Admiralty
  - George Hall, Civil Lord
- 30 July 1930: Commission
  - A. V. Alexander, First Lord
  - Sir Frederick Field, First Sea Lord
  - Sir Cyril Fuller, Second Sea Lord
  - Roger Backhouse, Third Sea Lord
  - Lionel Preston, Fourth Sea Lord
  - Frederic Dreyer, Deputy Chief of Naval Staff
  - Charles Ammon, Parliamentary and Financial Secretary to the Admiralty
  - George Hall, Civil Lord
- 27 August 1931: Commission
  - Sir Austen Chamberlain, First Lord
  - Sir Frederick Field, First Sea Lord
  - Sir Cyril Fuller, Second Sea Lord
  - Roger Backhouse, Third Sea Lord
  - Lionel Preston, Fourth Sea Lord
  - Frederic Dreyer, Deputy Chief of Naval Staff
- 7 September 1931: Commission
  - Sir Austen Chamberlain, First Lord
  - Sir Frederick Field, First Sea Lord
  - Sir Cyril Fuller, Second Sea Lord
  - Roger Backhouse, Third Sea Lord
  - Lionel Preston, Fourth Sea Lord
  - Frederic Dreyer, Deputy Chief of Naval Staff
  - James Stanhope, 7th Earl Stanhope, Parliamentary and Financial Secretary to the Admiralty
- 9 November 1931: Commission
  - Sir Bolton Eyres-Monsell, First Lord
  - Sir Frederick Field, First Sea Lord
  - Sir Cyril Fuller, Second Sea Lord
  - Roger Backhouse, Third Sea Lord
  - Lionel Preston, Fourth Sea Lord
  - Frederic Dreyer, Deputy Chief of Naval Staff
  - James Stanhope, 7th Earl Stanhope, Parliamentary and Financial Secretary to the Admiralty
- 11 November 1931: Commission
  - Sir Bolton Eyres-Monsell, First Lord
  - Sir Frederick Field, First Sea Lord
  - Sir Cyril Fuller, Second Sea Lord
  - Roger Backhouse, Third Sea Lord
  - Lionel Preston, Fourth Sea Lord
  - Frederic Dreyer, Deputy Chief of Naval Staff
  - Edward Stanley, Lord Stanley, Parliamentary and Financial Secretary to the Admiralty
  - Euan Wallace, Civil Lord
- 1 March 1932: Commission
  - Sir Bolton Eyres-Monsell, First Lord
  - Sir Frederick Field, First Sea Lord
  - Sir Cyril Fuller, Second Sea Lord
  - Charles Forbes, Third Sea Lord
  - Lionel Preston, Fourth Sea Lord
  - Frederic Dreyer, Deputy Chief of Naval Staff
  - Edward Stanley, Lord Stanley, Parliamentary and Financial Secretary to the Admiralty
  - Euan Wallace, Civil Lord
- 31 August 1932: Commission
  - Sir Bolton Eyres-Monsell, First Lord
  - Sir Frederick Field, First Sea Lord
  - Dudley Pound, Second Sea Lord
  - Charles Forbes, Third Sea Lord
  - Lionel Preston, Fourth Sea Lord
  - Frederic Dreyer, Deputy Chief of Naval Staff
  - Edward Stanley, Lord Stanley, Parliamentary and Financial Secretary to the Admiralty
  - Euan Wallace, Civil Lord
- 20 September 1932: Commission
  - Sir Bolton Eyres-Monsell, First Lord
  - Sir Frederick Field, First Sea Lord
  - Dudley Pound, Second Sea Lord
  - Charles Forbes, Third Sea Lord
  - Geoffrey Blake, Fourth Sea Lord
  - Sir Frederic Dreyer, Deputy Chief of Naval Staff
  - Edward Stanley, Lord Stanley, Parliamentary and Financial Secretary to the Admiralty
  - Euan Wallace, Civil Lord
- 9 January 1933: Commission
  - Sir Bolton Eyres-Monsell, First Lord
  - Sir Frederick Field, First Sea Lord
  - Dudley Pound, Second Sea Lord
  - Charles Forbes, Third Sea Lord
  - Geoffrey Blake, Fourth Sea Lord
  - Charles Little, Deputy Chief of Naval Staff
  - Edward Stanley, Lord Stanley, Parliamentary and Financial Secretary to the Admiralty
  - Euan Wallace, Civil Lord
- 21 January 1933: Commission
  - Sir Bolton Eyres-Monsell, First Lord
  - Sir Ernle Chatfield, First Sea Lord
  - Dudley Pound, Second Sea Lord
  - Charles Forbes, Third Sea Lord
  - Geoffrey Blake, Fourth Sea Lord
  - Charles Little, Deputy Chief of Naval Staff
  - Edward Stanley, Lord Stanley, Parliamentary and Financial Secretary to the Admiralty
  - Euan Wallace, Civil Lord
- 23 April 1934: Commission
  - Sir Bolton Eyres-Monsell, First Lord
  - Sir Ernle Chatfield, First Sea Lord
  - Sir Dudley Pound, Second Sea Lord
  - Reginald Henderson, Third Sea Lord
  - Geoffrey Blake, Fourth Sea Lord
  - Charles Little, Deputy Chief of Naval Staff
  - Edward Stanley, Lord Stanley, Parliamentary and Financial Secretary to the Admiralty
  - Euan Wallace, Civil Lord
- 15 February 1935: Commission
  - Sir Bolton Eyres-Monsell, First Lord
  - Sir Ernle Chatfield, First Sea Lord
  - Sir Dudley Pound, Second Sea Lord
  - Reginald Henderson, Third Sea Lord
  - Percy Noble, Fourth Sea Lord
  - Charles Little, Deputy Chief of Naval Staff
  - Edward Stanley, Lord Stanley, Parliamentary and Financial Secretary to the Admiralty
  - Euan Wallace, Civil Lord
- 24 June 1935: Commission
  - Sir Bolton Eyres-Monsell, First Lord
  - Sir Ernle Chatfield, First Sea Lord
  - Sir Dudley Pound, Second Sea Lord
  - Reginald Henderson, Third Sea Lord
  - Percy Noble, Fourth Sea Lord
  - Charles Little, Deputy Chief of Naval Staff
  - Charles Kennedy-Purvis, Assistant Chief of Naval Staff
  - Sir Victor Warrender, 8th Baronet, Parliamentary and Financial Secretary to the Admiralty
  - Kenneth Lindsay, Civil Lord
- 30 September 1935: Commission
  - Sir Bolton Eyres-Monsell, First Lord
  - Sir Ernle Chatfield, First Sea Lord
  - Sir Martin Dunbar-Nasmith, Second Sea Lord
  - Reginald Henderson, Third Sea Lord
  - Percy Noble, Fourth Sea Lord
  - Sir Charles Little, Deputy Chief of Naval Staff
  - Charles Kennedy-Purvis, Assistant Chief of Naval Staff
  - Sir Victor Warrender, 8th Baronet, Parliamentary and Financial Secretary to the Admiralty
  - Kenneth Lindsay, Civil Lord
- 29 October 1935: Commission
  - Sir Bolton Eyres-Monsell, First Lord
  - Sir Ernle Chatfield, First Sea Lord
  - Sir Martin Dunbar-Nasmith, Second Sea Lord
  - Reginald Henderson, Third Sea Lord
  - Percy Noble, Fourth Sea Lord
  - William Milbourne James, Deputy Chief of Naval Staff
  - Charles Kennedy-Purvis, Assistant Chief of Naval Staff
  - Sir Victor Warrender, 8th Baronet, Parliamentary and Financial Secretary to the Admiralty
  - Kenneth Lindsay, Civil Lord
- 3 December 1935: Commission
  - Bolton Eyres-Monsell, 1st Viscount Monsell, First Lord
  - Sir Ernle Chatfield, First Sea Lord
  - Sir Martin Dunbar-Nasmith, Second Sea Lord
  - Reginald Henderson, Third Sea Lord
  - Percy Noble, Fourth Sea Lord
  - William Milbourne James, Deputy Chief of Naval Staff
  - Charles Kennedy-Purvis, Assistant Chief of Naval Staff
  - Edward Stanley, Lord Stanley, Parliamentary and Financial Secretary to the Admiralty
  - Kenneth Lindsay, Civil Lord
- 6 June 1936: Commission
  - Sir Samuel Hoare, 2nd Baronet, First Lord
  - Sir Ernle Chatfield, First Sea Lord
  - Sir Martin Dunbar-Nasmith, Second Sea Lord
  - Sir Reginald Henderson, Third Sea Lord
  - Percy Noble, Fourth Sea Lord
  - Sir William Milbourne James, Deputy Chief of Naval Staff
  - Charles Kennedy-Purvis, Assistant Chief of Naval Staff
  - Edward Stanley, Lord Stanley, Parliamentary and Financial Secretary to the Admiralty
  - Kenneth Lindsay, Civil Lord
- 2 October 1936: Commission
  - Sir Samuel Hoare, 2nd Baronet, First Lord
  - Sir Ernle Chatfield, First Sea Lord
  - Sir Martin Dunbar-Nasmith, Second Sea Lord
  - Sir Reginald Henderson, Third Sea Lord
  - Sir Percy Noble, Fourth Sea Lord
  - Sir William Milbourne James, Deputy Chief of Naval Staff
  - John H. D. Cunningham, Assistant Chief of Naval Staff
  - Edward Stanley, Lord Stanley, Parliamentary and Financial Secretary to the Admiralty
  - Kenneth Lindsay, Civil Lord
- 1 October 1937: Commission
  - Duff Cooper, First Lord
  - Ernle Chatfield, 1st Baron Chatfield, First Sea Lord
  - Sir Martin Dunbar-Nasmith, Second Sea Lord
  - Sir Reginald Henderson, Third Sea Lord
  - Geoffrey Arbuthnot, Fourth Sea Lord
  - Sir William Milbourne James, Deputy Chief of Naval Staff
  - John H. D. Cunningham, Assistant Chief of Naval Staff
  - Geoffrey Shakespeare, Parliamentary and Financial Secretary to the Admiralty
  - John Jestyn Llewellin, Civil Lord
- 19 July 1938: Commission
  - Duff Cooper, First Lord
  - Ernle Chatfield, 1st Baron Chatfield, First Sea Lord
  - Sir Martin Dunbar-Nasmith, Second Sea Lord
  - Sir Reginald Henderson, Third Sea Lord
  - Geoffrey Arbuthnot, Fourth Sea Lord
  - Sir Alexander Ramsay, Fifth Sea Lord
  - Sir William Milbourne James, Deputy Chief of Naval Staff
  - Geoffrey Shakespeare, Parliamentary and Financial Secretary to the Admiralty
  - John Jestyn Llewellin, Civil Lord
- 7 September 1938: Commission
  - Duff Cooper, First Lord
  - Sir Roger Backhouse, First Sea Lord
  - Sir Martin Dunbar-Nasmith, Second Sea Lord
  - Sir Reginald Henderson, Third Sea Lord
  - Geoffrey Arbuthnot, Fourth Sea Lord
  - Sir Alexander Ramsay, Fifth Sea Lord
  - Sir William Milbourne James, Deputy Chief of Naval Staff
  - Geoffrey Shakespeare, Parliamentary and Financial Secretary to the Admiralty
  - John Jestyn Llewellin, Civil Lord
- 30 September 1938: Commission
  - Duff Cooper, First Lord
  - Sir Roger Backhouse, First Sea Lord
  - Sir Charles Little, Second Sea Lord
  - Sir Reginald Henderson, Third Sea Lord
  - Geoffrey Arbuthnot, Fourth Sea Lord
  - Sir Alexander Ramsay, Fifth Sea Lord
  - Sir William Milbourne James, Deputy Chief of Naval Staff
  - Geoffrey Shakespeare, Parliamentary and Financial Secretary to the Admiralty
  - John Jestyn Llewellin, Civil Lord
- 27 October 1938: Commission
  - James Stanhope, 7th Earl Stanhope, First Lord
  - Sir Roger Backhouse, First Sea Lord
  - Sir Charles Little, Second Sea Lord
  - Sir Reginald Henderson, Third Sea Lord
  - Geoffrey Arbuthnot, Fourth Sea Lord
  - Sir Alexander Ramsay, Fifth Sea Lord
  - Sir William Milbourne James, Deputy Chief of Naval Staff
  - Geoffrey Shakespeare, Parliamentary and Financial Secretary to the Admiralty
  - John Jestyn Llewellin, Civil Lord
- 14 November 1938: Commission
  - James Stanhope, 7th Earl Stanhope, First Lord
  - Sir Roger Backhouse, First Sea Lord
  - Sir Charles Little, Second Sea Lord
  - Sir Reginald Henderson, Third Sea Lord
  - Geoffrey Arbuthnot, Fourth Sea Lord
  - Sir Alexander Ramsay, Fifth Sea Lord
  - Andrew Cunningham, Deputy Chief of Naval Staff
  - Geoffrey Shakespeare, Parliamentary and Financial Secretary to the Admiralty
  - John Jestyn Llewellin, Civil Lord
- 1 March 1939: Commission
  - James Stanhope, 7th Earl Stanhope, First Lord
  - Sir Roger Backhouse, First Sea Lord
  - Sir Charles Little, Second Sea Lord
  - Bruce Fraser, Third Sea Lord
  - Geoffrey Arbuthnot, Fourth Sea Lord
  - Sir Alexander Ramsay, Fifth Sea Lord
  - Andrew Cunningham, Deputy Chief of Naval Staff
  - Geoffrey Shakespeare, Parliamentary and Financial Secretary to the Admiralty
  - John Jestyn Llewellin, Civil Lord
- 1 June 1939: Commission
  - James Stanhope, 7th Earl Stanhope, First Lord
  - Sir Roger Backhouse, First Sea Lord
  - Sir Charles Little, Second Sea Lord
  - Bruce Fraser, Third Sea Lord
  - Geoffrey Arbuthnot, Fourth Sea Lord
  - Sir Alexander Ramsay, Fifth Sea Lord
  - Tom Phillips, Deputy Chief of Naval Staff
  - Geoffrey Shakespeare, Parliamentary and Financial Secretary to the Admiralty
  - John Jestyn Llewellin, Civil Lord
- 12 June 1939: Commission
  - James Stanhope, 7th Earl Stanhope, First Lord
  - Sir Dudley Pound, First Sea Lord
  - Sir Charles Little, Second Sea Lord
  - Bruce Fraser, Third Sea Lord
  - Geoffrey Arbuthnot, Fourth Sea Lord
  - Sir Alexander Ramsay, Fifth Sea Lord
  - Tom Phillips, Deputy Chief of Naval Staff
  - Geoffrey Shakespeare, Parliamentary and Financial Secretary to the Admiralty
  - John Jestyn Llewellin, Civil Lord
- 15 July 1939: Commission
  - James Stanhope, 7th Earl Stanhope, First Lord
  - Sir Dudley Pound, First Sea Lord
  - Sir Charles Little, Second Sea Lord
  - Bruce Fraser, Third Sea Lord
  - Geoffrey Arbuthnot, Fourth Sea Lord
  - Sir Alexander Ramsay, Fifth Sea Lord
  - Tom Phillips, Deputy Chief of Naval Staff
  - Geoffrey Shakespeare, Parliamentary and Financial Secretary to the Admiralty
  - Austin Uvedale Morgan Hudson, Civil Lord
- 3 September 1939: Commission
  - Winston Churchill, First Lord
  - Sir Dudley Pound, First Sea Lord
  - Sir Charles Little, Second Sea Lord
  - Bruce Fraser, Third Sea Lord
  - Geoffrey Arbuthnot, Fourth Sea Lord
  - Sir Alexander Ramsay, Fifth Sea Lord
  - Tom Phillips, Deputy Chief of Naval Staff
  - Harold Burrough, Assistant Chief of Naval Staff
  - Geoffrey Shakespeare, Parliamentary and Financial Secretary to the Admiralty
  - Austin Uvedale Morgan Hudson, Civil Lord
- 21 November 1939: Commission
  - Winston Churchill, First Lord
  - Sir Dudley Pound, First Sea Lord
  - Sir Charles Little, Second Sea Lord
  - Bruce Fraser, Third Sea Lord
  - Geoffrey Arbuthnot, Fourth Sea Lord
  - Guy Royle, Fifth Sea Lord
  - Tom Phillips, Deputy Chief of Naval Staff
  - Harold Burrough, Assistant Chief of Naval Staff
  - Geoffrey Shakespeare, Parliamentary and Financial Secretary to the Admiralty
  - Austin Uvedale Morgan Hudson, Civil Lord
- 1 February 1940: Commission
  - Winston Churchill, First Lord
  - Sir Dudley Pound, First Sea Lord
  - Sir Charles Little, Second Sea Lord
  - Bruce Fraser, Third Sea Lord
  - Geoffrey Arbuthnot, Fourth Sea Lord
  - Guy Royle, Fifth Sea Lord
  - Tom Phillips, Deputy Chief of Naval Staff
  - Harold Burrough, Assistant Chief of Naval Staff
  - Geoffrey Shakespeare, Parliamentary and Financial Secretary to the Admiralty
  - Austin Uvedale Morgan Hudson, Civil Lord
  - Sir James Lithgow, 1st Baronet, Controller of Merchant Shipbuilding and Repairs
- 4 April 1940: Commission
  - Winston Churchill, First Lord
  - Sir Dudley Pound, First Sea Lord
  - Sir Charles Little, Second Sea Lord
  - Bruce Fraser, Third Sea Lord
  - Geoffrey Arbuthnot, Fourth Sea Lord
  - Guy Royle, Fifth Sea Lord
  - Tom Phillips, Deputy Chief of Naval Staff
  - Harold Burrough, Assistant Chief of Naval Staff
  - Sir Victor Warrender, 8th Baronet, Parliamentary and Financial Secretary to the Admiralty
  - Austin Uvedale Morgan Hudson, Civil Lord
  - Sir James Lithgow, 1st Baronet, Controller of Merchant Shipbuilding and Repairs
- 8 April 1940: Commission
  - Winston Churchill, First Lord
  - Sir Dudley Pound, First Sea Lord
  - Sir Charles Little, Second Sea Lord
  - Bruce Fraser, Third Sea Lord
  - Geoffrey Arbuthnot, Fourth Sea Lord
  - Guy Royle, Fifth Sea Lord
  - Tom Phillips, Deputy Chief of Naval Staff
  - Harold Burrough, Assistant Chief of Naval Staff
  - Sir Geoffrey Blake, Assistant Chief of Naval Staff (Foreign)
  - Sir Victor Warrender, 8th Baronet, Parliamentary and Financial Secretary to the Admiralty
  - Austin Uvedale Morgan Hudson, Civil Lord
  - Sir James Lithgow, 1st Baronet, Controller of Merchant Shipbuilding and Repairs
- 12 May 1940: Commission
  - A. V. Alexander, First Lord
  - Sir Dudley Pound, First Sea Lord
  - Sir Charles Little, Second Sea Lord
  - Bruce Fraser, Third Sea Lord
  - Geoffrey Arbuthnot, Fourth Sea Lord
  - Guy Royle, Fifth Sea Lord
  - Tom Phillips, Deputy Chief of Naval Staff
  - Harold Burrough, Assistant Chief of Naval Staff
  - Sir Geoffrey Blake, Assistant Chief of Naval Staff (Foreign)
  - Sir Victor Warrender, 8th Baronet, Parliamentary and Financial Secretary to the Admiralty
  - Austin Uvedale Morgan Hudson, Civil Lord
  - Sir James Lithgow, 1st Baronet, Controller of Merchant Shipbuilding and Repairs
- 27 May 1940: Commission
  - A. V. Alexander, First Lord
  - Sir Dudley Pound, First Sea Lord
  - Sir Charles Little, Second Sea Lord
  - Bruce Fraser, Third Sea Lord
  - Geoffrey Arbuthnot, Fourth Sea Lord
  - Guy Royle, Fifth Sea Lord
  - Tom Phillips, Deputy Chief of Naval Staff
  - Harold Burrough, Assistant Chief of Naval Staff
  - Sir Geoffrey Blake, Assistant Chief of Naval Staff (Foreign)
  - Arthur Power, Assistant Chief of Naval Staff (Home)
  - Sir Victor Warrender, 8th Baronet, Parliamentary and Financial Secretary to the Admiralty
  - Austin Uvedale Morgan Hudson, Civil Lord
  - Sir James Lithgow, 1st Baronet, Controller of Merchant Shipbuilding and Repairs
- 25 July 1940: Commission
  - A. V. Alexander, First Lord
  - Sir Dudley Pound, First Sea Lord
  - Sir Charles Little, Second Sea Lord
  - Bruce Fraser, Third Sea Lord
  - Geoffrey Arbuthnot, Fourth Sea Lord
  - Guy Royle, Fifth Sea Lord
  - Tom Phillips, Deputy Chief of Naval Staff
  - Henry Moore, Assistant Chief of Naval Staff (Trade)
  - Sir Geoffrey Blake, Assistant Chief of Naval Staff (Foreign)
  - Arthur Power, Assistant Chief of Naval Staff (Home)
  - Sir Victor Warrender, 8th Baronet, Parliamentary and Financial Secretary to the Admiralty
  - Austin Uvedale Morgan Hudson, Civil Lord
  - Sir James Lithgow, 1st Baronet, Controller of Merchant Shipbuilding and Repairs
- 2 December 1940: Commission
  - A. V. Alexander, First Lord
  - Sir Dudley Pound, First Sea Lord
  - Sir Charles Little, Second Sea Lord
  - Bruce Fraser, Third Sea Lord
  - Geoffrey Arbuthnot, Fourth Sea Lord
  - Guy Royle Fifth Sea Lord
  - Tom Phillips, Deputy Chief of Naval Staff
  - Henry Moore, Assistant Chief of Naval Staff (Trade)
  - Sir Henry Harwood, Assistant Chief of Naval Staff (Foreign)
  - Arthur Power, Assistant Chief of Naval Staff (Home)
  - Sir Victor Warrender, 8th Baronet, Parliamentary and Financial Secretary to the Admiralty
  - Austin Uvedale Morgan Hudson, Civil Lord
  - Sir James Lithgow, 1st Baronet, Controller of Merchant Shipbuilding and Repairs
- 5 December 1940: Commission
  - A. V. Alexander, First Lord
  - Sir Dudley Pound, First Sea Lord
  - Sir Charles Little, Second Sea Lord
  - Bruce Fraser, Third Sea Lord
  - Geoffrey Arbuthnot, Fourth Sea Lord
  - Guy Royle, Fifth Sea Lord
  - Tom Phillips, Deputy Chief of Naval Staff
  - Henry Moore, Assistant Chief of Naval Staff (Trade)
  - Sir Henry Harwood, Assistant Chief of Naval Staff (Foreign)
  - Arthur Power, Assistant Chief of Naval Staff (Home)
  - Sir Victor Warrender, 8th Baronet, Parliamentary and Financial Secretary to the Admiralty
  - Austin Uvedale Morgan Hudson, Civil Lord
  - Sir James Lithgow, 1st Baronet, Controller of Merchant Shipbuilding and Repairs
  - Henry Vaughan Markham, Permanent Secretary to the Admiralty
- 1 April 1941: Commission
  - A. V. Alexander, First Lord
  - Sir Dudley Pound, First Sea Lord
  - Sir Charles Little, Second Sea Lord
  - Bruce Fraser, Third Sea Lord
  - John H. D. Cunningham, Fourth Sea Lord
  - Sir Guy Royle, Fifth Sea Lord
  - Tom Phillips, Deputy Chief of Naval Staff
  - Henry Moore, Assistant Chief of Naval Staff (Trade)
  - Sir Henry Harwood, Assistant Chief of Naval Staff (Foreign)
  - Arthur Power, Assistant Chief of Naval Staff (Home)
  - Sir Victor Warrender, 8th Baronet, Parliamentary and Financial Secretary to the Admiralty
  - Austin Uvedale Morgan Hudson, Civil Lord
  - Sir James Lithgow, 1st Baronet, Controller of Merchant Shipbuilding and Repairs
  - Henry Vaughan Markham, Permanent Secretary to the Admiralty
- 14 April 1941: Commission
  - A. V. Alexander, First Lord
  - Sir Dudley Pound, First Sea Lord
  - Sir Charles Little, Second Sea Lord
  - Bruce Fraser, Third Sea Lord
  - John H. D. Cunningham, Fourth Sea Lord
  - Lumley Lyster, Fifth Sea Lord
  - Tom Phillips, Deputy Chief of Naval Staff
  - Henry Moore, Assistant Chief of Naval Staff (Trade)
  - Sir Henry Harwood, Assistant Chief of Naval Staff (Foreign)
  - Arthur Power, Assistant Chief of Naval Staff (Home)
  - Sir Victor Warrender, 8th Baronet, Parliamentary and Financial Secretary to the Admiralty
  - Austin Uvedale Morgan Hudson, Civil Lord
  - Sir James Lithgow, 1st Baronet, Controller of Merchant Shipbuilding and Repairs
  - Henry Vaughan Markham, Permanent Secretary to the Admiralty
- 1 June 1941: Commission
  - A. V. Alexander, First Lord
  - Sir Dudley Pound, First Sea Lord
  - William Whitworth, Second Sea Lord
  - Bruce Fraser, Third Sea Lord
  - John H. D. Cunningham, Fourth Sea Lord
  - Lumley Lyster, Fifth Sea Lord
  - Tom Phillips, Deputy Chief of Naval Staff
  - Henry Moore, Assistant Chief of Naval Staff (Trade)
  - Sir Henry Harwood, Assistant Chief of Naval Staff (Foreign)
  - Arthur Power, Assistant Chief of Naval Staff (Home)
  - Sir Victor Warrender, 8th Baronet, Parliamentary and Financial Secretary to the Admiralty
  - Austin Uvedale Morgan Hudson, Civil Lord
  - Sir James Lithgow, 1st Baronet, Controller of Merchant Shipbuilding and Repairs
  - Henry Vaughan Markham, Permanent Secretary to the Admiralty
- 22 September 1941: Commission
  - A. V. Alexander, First Lord
  - Sir Dudley Pound, First Sea Lord
  - Sir William Whitworth, Second Sea Lord
  - Sir Bruce Fraser, Third Sea Lord
  - Sir John Cunningham, Fourth Sea Lord
  - Lumley Lyster, Fifth Sea Lord
  - Sir Tom Phillips, Deputy Chief of Naval Staff
  - Henry Moore, Assistant Chief of Naval Staff (Trade)
  - Sir Henry Harwood, Assistant Chief of Naval Staff (Foreign)
  - Arthur Power, Assistant Chief of Naval Staff (Home)
  - Rhoderick McGrigor, Assistant Chief of Naval Staff (Weapons)
  - Sir Victor Warrender, 8th Baronet, Parliamentary and Financial Secretary to the Admiralty
  - Austin Uvedale Morgan Hudson, Civil Lord
  - Sir James Lithgow, 1st Baronet, Controller of Merchant Shipbuilding and Repairs
  - Sir Henry Vaughan Markham, Permanent Secretary to the Admiralty
- 21 October 1941: Commission
  - A. V. Alexander, First Lord
  - Sir Dudley Pound, First Sea Lord
  - Sir William Whitworth, Second Sea Lord
  - Sir Bruce Fraser, Third Sea Lord
  - Sir John Cunningham, Fourth Sea Lord
  - Lumley Lyster, Fifth Sea Lord
  - Sir Tom Phillips, Deputy Chief of Naval Staff
  - Henry Moore, Assistant Chief of Naval Staff (Trade)
  - Edward King, Assistant Chief of Naval Staff (Trade)
  - Sir Henry Harwood, Assistant Chief of Naval Staff (Foreign)
  - Arthur Power, Assistant Chief of Naval Staff (Home)
  - Rhoderick McGrigor, Assistant Chief of Naval Staff (Weapons)
  - Sir Victor Warrender, 8th Baronet, Parliamentary and Financial Secretary to the Admiralty
  - Austin Uvedale Morgan Hudson, Civil Lord
  - Sir James Lithgow, 1st Baronet, Controller of Merchant Shipbuilding and Repairs
  - Sir Henry Vaughan Markham, Permanent Secretary to the Admiralty

== 1941 to 1964 ==
- 9 February 1942: Commission
  - A. V. Alexander, First Lord
  - Sir Dudley Pound, First Sea Lord
  - Sir William Whitworth, Second Sea Lord
  - Sir Bruce Fraser, Third Sea Lord
  - Sir John Cunningham, Fourth Sea Lord
  - Lumley Lyster, Fifth Sea Lord
  - Henry Moore, Vice Chief of Naval Staff
  - Edward King, Assistant Chief of Naval Staff (Trade)
  - Sir Henry Harwood, Assistant Chief of Naval Staff (Foreign)
  - Arthur Power, Assistant Chief of Naval Staff (Home)
  - Rhoderick McGrigor, Assistant Chief of Naval Staff (Weapons)
  - George Hall, Civil Lord
  - Sir Victor Warrender, 8th Baronet, Parliamentary and Financial Secretary to the Admiralty
  - Austin Uvedale Morgan Hudson, Civil Lord
  - Sir James Lithgow, 1st Baronet, Controller of Merchant Shipbuilding and Repairs
  - Sir Henry Vaughan Markham, Permanent Secretary to the Admiralty
- 5 March 1942: Commission
  - A. V. Alexander, First Lord
  - Sir Dudley Pound, First Sea Lord
  - Sir William Whitworth, Second Sea Lord
  - Sir Bruce Fraser, Third Sea Lord
  - Sir John Cunningham, Fourth Sea Lord
  - Arthur Lyster, Fifth Sea Lord
  - Henry Moore, Vice Chief of Naval Staff
  - Edward King, Assistant Chief of Naval Staff (Trade)
  - Sir Henry Harwood, Assistant Chief of Naval Staff (Foreign)
  - Arthur Power, Assistant Chief of Naval Staff (Home)
  - Rhoderick McGrigor, Assistant Chief of Naval Staff (Weapons)
  - George Hall, Civil Lord
  - Sir Victor Warrender, 8th Baronet, Parliamentary and Financial Secretary to the Admiralty
  - Richard Pilkington, Civil Lord
  - Sir James Lithgow, 1st Baronet, Controller of Merchant Shipbuilding and Repairs
  - Sir Henry Vaughan Markham, Permanent Secretary to the Admiralty
- 8 April 1942: Commission
  - A. V. Alexander, First Lord
  - Sir Dudley Pound, First Sea Lord
  - Sir William Whitworth, Second Sea Lord
  - Sir Bruce Fraser, Third Sea Lord
  - Sir John Cunningham, Fourth Sea Lord
  - Lumley Lyster, Fifth Sea Lord
  - Henry Moore, Vice Chief of Naval Staff
  - Edward King, Assistant Chief of Naval Staff (Trade)
  - Arthur Power, Assistant Chief of Naval Staff (Home)
  - Rhoderick McGrigor, Assistant Chief of Naval Staff (Weapons)
  - George Hall, Civil Lord
  - Victor Warrender, 1st Baron Bruntisfield, Parliamentary and Financial Secretary to the Admiralty
  - Richard Pilkington, Civil Lord
  - Sir James Lithgow, 1st Baronet, Controller of Merchant Shipbuilding and Repairs
  - Sir Henry Vaughan Markham, Permanent Secretary to the Admiralty
- 22 May 1942: Commission
  - A. V. Alexander, First Lord
  - Sir Dudley Pound, First Sea Lord
  - Sir William Whitworth, Second Sea Lord
  - Sir Frederic Wake-Walker, Third Sea Lord
  - Sir John Cunningham, Fourth Sea Lord
  - Lumley Lyster, Fifth Sea Lord
  - Henry Moore, Vice Chief of Naval Staff
  - Edward King, Assistant Chief of Naval Staff (Trade)
  - Arthur Power, Assistant Chief of Naval Staff (Home)
  - Rhoderick McGrigor, Assistant Chief of Naval Staff (Weapons)
  - George Hall, Civil Lord
  - Victor Warrender, 1st Baron Bruntisfield, Parliamentary and Financial Secretary to the Admiralty
  - Richard Pilkington, Civil Lord
  - Sir James Lithgow, 1st Baronet, Controller of Merchant Shipbuilding and Repairs
  - Sir Henry Vaughan Markham, Permanent Secretary to the Admiralty
- 28 May 1942: Commission
  - A. V. Alexander, First Lord
  - Sir Dudley Pound, First Sea Lord
  - Sir William Whitworth, Second Sea Lord
  - Sir Frederic Wake-Walker, Third Sea Lord
  - Sir John Cunningham, Fourth Sea Lord
  - Lumley Lyster, Fifth Sea Lord
  - Henry Moore, Vice Chief of Naval Staff
  - Edward King, Assistant Chief of Naval Staff (Trade)
  - Rhoderick McGrigor, Assistant Chief of Naval Staff (Weapons)
  - George Hall, Civil Lord
  - Victor Warrender, 1st Baron Bruntisfield, Parliamentary and Financial Secretary to the Admiralty
  - Richard Pilkington, Civil Lord
  - Sir James Lithgow, 1st Baronet, Controller of Merchant Shipbuilding and Repairs
  - Sir Henry Vaughan Markham, Permanent Secretary to the Admiralty
- 7 December 1942: Commission
  - A. V. Alexander, First Lord
  - Sir Dudley Pound, First Sea Lord
  - Sir Charles Kennedy-Purvis, Deputy First Sea Lord
  - Sir William Whitworth, Second Sea Lord
  - Sir Frederic Wake-Walker, Third Sea Lord
  - Sir John Cunningham, Fourth Sea Lord
  - Sir Henry Moore, Vice Chief of Naval Staff
  - John Edelsten, Assistant Chief of Naval Staff (U-boat Warfare and Trade)
  - Rhoderick McGrigor, Assistant Chief of Naval Staff (Weapons)
  - George Hall, Civil Lord
  - Victor Warrender, 1st Baron Bruntisfield, Parliamentary and Financial Secretary to the Admiralty
  - Richard Pilkington, Civil Lord
- Sir James Lithgow, 1st Baronet, Controller of Merchant Shipbuilding and Repairs
  - Sir Henry Vaughan Markham, Permanent Secretary to the Admiralty
- 14 January 1943: Commission
  - A. V. Alexander, First Lord
  - Sir Dudley Pound, First Sea Lord
  - Sir Charles Kennedy-Purvis, Deputy First Sea Lord
  - Sir William Whitworth, Second Sea Lord
  - Sir Frederic Wake-Walker, Third Sea Lord
  - Sir John Cunningham, Fourth Sea Lord
  - Denis Boyd, Fifth Sea Lord
  - Sir Henry Moore, Vice Chief of Naval Staff
  - John Edelsten, Assistant Chief of Naval Staff (U-boat Warfare and Trade)
  - Rhoderick McGrigor, Assistant Chief of Naval Staff (Weapons)
  - George Hall, Civil Lord
  - Victor Warrender, 1st Baron Bruntisfield, Parliamentary and Financial Secretary to the Admiralty
  - Richard Pilkington, Civil Lord
  - Sir James Lithgow, 1st Baronet, Controller of Merchant Shipbuilding and Repairs
  - Sir Henry Vaughan Markham, Permanent Secretary to the Admiralty
- 8 March 1943: Commission
  - A. V. Alexander, First Lord
  - Sir Dudley Pound, First Sea Lord
  - Sir Charles Kennedy-Purvis, Deputy First Sea Lord
  - Sir William Whitworth, Second Sea Lord
  - Sir Frederic Wake-Walker, Third Sea Lord
  - Sir John Cunningham, Fourth Sea Lord
  - Denis Boyd, Fifth Sea Lord
  - Sir Henry Moore, Vice Chief of Naval Staff
  - John Edelsten, Assistant Chief of Naval Staff (U-boat Warfare and Trade)
  - Wilfrid Patterson, Assistant Chief of Naval Staff (Weapons)
  - George Hall, Civil Lord
  - Victor Warrender, 1st Baron Bruntisfield, Parliamentary and Financial Secretary to the Admiralty
  - Richard Pilkington, Civil Lord
  - Sir James Lithgow, 1st Baronet, Controller of Merchant Shipbuilding and Repairs
  - Sir Henry Vaughan Markham, Permanent Secretary to the Admiralty
- 8 May 1943: Commission
  - A. V. Alexander, First Lord
  - Sir Dudley Pound, First Sea Lord
  - Sir Charles Kennedy-Purvis, Deputy First Sea Lord
  - Sir William Whitworth, Second Sea Lord
  - Sir Frederic Wake-Walker, Third Sea Lord
  - Frank Pegram, Fourth Sea Lord
  - Denis Boyd, Fifth Sea Lord
  - Sir Henry Moore, Vice Chief of Naval Staff
  - John Edelsten, Assistant Chief of Naval Staff (U-boat Warfare and Trade)
  - Wilfrid Patterson, Assistant Chief of Naval Staff (Weapons)
  - George Hall, Civil Lord
  - Victor Warrender, 1st Baron Bruntisfield, Parliamentary and Financial Secretary to the Admiralty
  - Richard Pilkington, Civil Lord
  - Sir James Lithgow, 1st Baronet, Controller of Merchant Shipbuilding and Repairs
  - Sir Henry Vaughan Markham, Permanent Secretary to the Admiralty
- 7 June 1943: Commission
  - A. V. Alexander, First Lord
  - Sir Dudley Pound, First Sea Lord
  - Sir Charles Kennedy-Purvis, Deputy First Sea Lord
  - Sir William Whitworth, Second Sea Lord
  - Sir Frederic Wake-Walker, Third Sea Lord
  - Frank Pegram, Fourth Sea Lord
  - Denis Boyd, Fifth Sea Lord
  - Sir Edward Syfret, Vice Chief of Naval Staff
  - John Edelsten, Assistant Chief of Naval Staff (U-boat Warfare and Trade)
  - Wilfrid Patterson, Assistant Chief of Naval Staff (Weapons)
  - George Hall, Civil Lord
  - Victor Warrender, 1st Baron Bruntisfield, Parliamentary and Financial Secretary to the Admiralty
  - Richard Pilkington, Civil Lord
  - Sir James Lithgow, 1st Baronet, Controller of Merchant Shipbuilding and Repairs
  - Sir Henry Vaughan Markham, Permanent Secretary of the Admiralty
- 28 September 1943: Commission
  - A. V. Alexander, First Lord
  - Sir Dudley Pound, First Sea Lord
  - Sir Charles Kennedy-Purvis, Deputy First Sea Lord
  - Sir William Whitworth, Second Sea Lord
  - Sir Frederic Wake-Walker, Third Sea Lord
  - Frank Pegram, Fourth Sea Lord
  - Denis Boyd, Fifth Sea Lord
  - Sir Edward Syfret, Vice Chief of Naval Staff
  - John Edelsten, Assistant Chief of Naval Staff (U-boat Warfare and Trade)
  - Wilfrid Patterson, Assistant Chief of Naval Staff (Weapons)
  - Victor Warrender, 1st Baron Bruntisfield, Parliamentary and Financial Secretary to the Admiralty
  - Richard Pilkington, Civil Lord
  - James Thomas, Civil Lord
  - Sir James Lithgow, 1st Baronet, Controller of Merchant Shipbuilding and Repairs
  - Sir Henry Vaughan Markham, Permanent Secretary of the Admiralty
- 15 October 1943: Commission
  - A. V. Alexander, First Lord
  - Sir Andrew Cunningham, 1st Baronet, First Sea Lord
  - Sir Charles Kennedy-Purvis, Deputy First Sea Lord
  - Sir William Whitworth, Second Sea Lord
  - Sir Frederic Wake-Walker, Third Sea Lord
  - Frank Pegram, Fourth Sea Lord
  - Denis Boyd, Fifth Sea Lord
  - Sir Edward Syfret, Vice Chief of Naval Staff
  - John Edelsten, Assistant Chief of Naval Staff (U-boat Warfare and Trade)
  - Wilfrid Patterson, Assistant Chief of Naval Staff (Weapons)
  - Victor Warrender, 1st Baron Bruntisfield, Parliamentary and Financial Secretary to the Admiralty
  - Richard Pilkington, Civil Lord
  - James Thomas, Civil Lord
  - Sir James Lithgow, 1st Baronet, Controller of Merchant Shipbuilding and Repairs
  - Sir Henry Vaughan Markham, Permanent Secretary of the Admiralty
- 8 March 1944: Commission
  - A. V. Alexander, First Lord
  - Sir Andrew Cunningham, 1st Baronet, First Sea Lord
  - Sir Charles Kennedy-Purvis, Deputy First Sea Lord
  - Sir Algernon Willis, Second Sea Lord
  - Sir Frederic Wake-Walker, Third Sea Lord
  - Frank Pegram, Fourth Sea Lord
  - Denis Boyd, Fifth Sea Lord
  - Sir Edward Syfret, Vice Chief of Naval Staff
  - John Edelsten, Assistant Chief of Naval Staff (U-boat Warfare and Trade)
  - Wilfrid Patterson, Assistant Chief of Naval Staff (Weapons)
  - Victor Warrender, 1st Baron Bruntisfield, Parliamentary and Financial Secretary to the Admiralty
  - Richard Pilkington, Civil Lord
  - James Thomas, Civil Lord
  - Sir James Lithgow, 1st Baronet, Controller of Merchant Shipbuilding and Repairs
  - Sir Henry Vaughan Markham, Permanent Secretary of the Admiralty
- 20 March 1944: Commission
  - A. V. Alexander, First Lord
  - Sir Andrew Cunningham, 1st Baronet, First Sea Lord
  - Sir Charles Kennedy-Purvis, Deputy First Sea Lord
  - Sir Algernon Willis, Second Sea Lord
  - Sir Frederic Wake-Walker, Third Sea Lord
  - Arthur Palliser, Fourth Sea Lord
  - Denis Boyd, Fifth Sea Lord
  - Sir Edward Syfret, Vice Chief of Naval Staff
  - John Edelsten, Assistant Chief of Naval Staff (U-boat Warfare and Trade)
  - Wilfrid Patterson, Assistant Chief of Naval Staff (Weapons)
  - Victor Warrender, 1st Baron Bruntisfield, Parliamentary and Financial Secretary to the Admiralty
  - Richard Pilkington, Civil Lord
  - James Thomas, Civil Lord
  - Sir James Lithgow, 1st Baronet, Controller of Merchant Shipbuilding and Repairs
  - Sir Henry Vaughan Markham, Permanent Secretary of the Admiralty
- 11 December 1944: Commission
  - A. V. Alexander, First Lord
  - Sir Andrew Cunningham, 1st Baronet, First Sea Lord
  - Sir Charles Kennedy-Purvis, Deputy First Sea Lord
  - Sir Algernon Willis, Second Sea Lord
  - Sir Frederic Wake-Walker, Third Sea Lord
  - Arthur Palliser, Fourth Sea Lord
  - Denis Boyd, Fifth Sea Lord
  - Sir Edward Syfret, Vice Chief of Naval Staff
  - Wilfrid Patterson, Assistant Chief of Naval Staff (Weapons)
  - Victor Warrender, 1st Baron Bruntisfield, Parliamentary and Financial Secretary to the Admiralty
  - Richard Pilkington, Civil Lord
  - James Thomas, Civil Lord
  - Sir James Lithgow, 1st Baronet, Controller of Merchant Shipbuilding and Repairs
  - Sir Henry Vaughan Markham, Permanent Secretary of the Admiralty
- 3 March 1945: Commission
  - A. V. Alexander, First Lord
  - Sir Andrew Cunningham, 1st Baronet, First Sea Lord
  - Sir Charles Kennedy-Purvis, Deputy First Sea Lord
  - Sir Algernon Willis, Second Sea Lord
  - Sir Frederic Wake-Walker, Third Sea Lord
  - Sir Arthur Palliser, Fourth Sea Lord
  - Denis Boyd, Fifth Sea Lord
  - Sir Edward Syfret, Vice Chief of Naval Staff
  - Victor Warrender, 1st Baron Bruntisfield, Parliamentary and Financial Secretary to the Admiralty
  - Richard Pilkington, Civil Lord
  - James Thomas, Civil Lord
  - Sir James Lithgow, 1st Baronet, Controller of Merchant Shipbuilding and Repairs
  - Sir Henry Vaughan Markham, Permanent Secretary of the Admiralty
- 1 May 1945: Commission
  - A. V. Alexander, First Lord
  - Sir Andrew Cunningham, 1st Baronet, First Sea Lord
  - Sir Charles Kennedy-Purvis, Deputy First Sea Lord
  - Sir Algernon Willis, Second Sea Lord
  - Sir Frederic Wake-Walker, Third Sea Lord
  - Sir Arthur Palliser, Fourth Sea Lord
  - Thomas Hope Troubridge, Fifth Sea Lord
  - Sir Edward Syfret, Vice Chief of Naval Staff
  - Victor Warrender, 1st Baron Bruntisfield, Parliamentary and Financial Secretary to the Admiralty
  - Richard Pilkington, Civil Lord
  - James Thomas, Civil Lord
  - Sir James Lithgow, 1st Baronet, Controller of Merchant Shipbuilding and Repairs
  - Sir Henry Vaughan Markham, Permanent Secretary to the Admiralty
- 29 May 1945: Commission
  - Brendan Bracken, First Lord
  - Sir Andrew Cunningham, 1st Baronet, First Sea Lord
  - Sir Charles Kennedy-Purvis, Deputy First Sea Lord
  - Sir Algernon Willis, Second Sea Lord
  - Sir Frederic Wake-Walker, Third Sea Lord
  - Sir Arthur Palliser, Fourth Sea Lord
  - Thomas Hope Troubridge, Fifth Sea Lord
  - Sir Edward Syfret, Vice Chief of Naval Staff
  - Victor Warrender, 1st Baron Bruntisfield, Parliamentary and Financial Secretary to the Admiralty
  - Richard Pilkington, Civil Lord
  - James Thomas, Civil Lord
  - Sir James Lithgow, 1st Baronet, Controller of Merchant Shipbuilding and Repairs
  - Sir Henry Vaughan Markham, Permanent Secretary of the Admiralty
- 4 August 1945: Commission
  - A. V. Alexander, First Lord
  - Sir Andrew Cunningham, 1st Baronet, First Sea Lord
  - Sir Charles Kennedy-Purvis, Deputy First Sea Lord
  - Sir Algernon Willis, Second Sea Lord
  - Sir Frederic Wake-Walker, Third Sea Lord
  - Sir Arthur Palliser, Fourth Sea Lord
  - Thomas Hope Troubridge, Fifth Sea Lord
  - Sir Edward Syfret, Vice Chief of Naval Staff
  - John Dugdale, Parliamentary and Financial Secretary to the Admiralty
  - Walter Edwards, Civil Lord
  - Sir James Lithgow, 1st Baronet, Controller of Merchant Shipbuilding and Repairs
  - Sir Henry Vaughan Markham, Permanent Secretary of the Admiralty
- 5 October 1945: Commission
  - A. V. Alexander, First Lord
  - Andrew Cunningham, 1st Baron Cunningham of Hyndhope, First Sea Lord
  - Sir Charles Kennedy-Purvis, Deputy First Sea Lord
  - Sir Algernon Willis, Second Sea Lord
  - Sir Frederic Wake-Walker, Third Sea Lord
  - Sir Arthur Palliser, Fourth Sea Lord
  - Thomas Hope Troubridge, Fifth Sea Lord
  - Sir Rhoderick McGrigor, Vice Chief of Naval Staff
  - John Dugdale, Parliamentary and Financial Secretary to the Admiralty
  - Walter Edwards, Civil Lord
  - Sir James Lithgow, 1st Baronet, Controller of Merchant Shipbuilding and Repairs
  - Sir Henry Vaughan Markham, Permanent Secretary of the Admiralty
- 4 December 1945: Commission
  - A. V. Alexander, First Lord
  - Andrew Cunningham, 1st Baron Cunningham of Hyndhope, First Sea Lord
  - Sir Charles Kennedy-Purvis, Deputy First Sea Lord
  - Sir Algernon Willis, Second Sea Lord
  - Charles Daniel, Third Sea Lord
  - Sir Arthur Palliser, Fourth Sea Lord
  - Thomas Hope Troubridge, Fifth Sea Lord
  - Sir Rhoderick McGrigor, Vice Chief of Naval Staff
  - John Dugdale, Parliamentary and Financial Secretary to the Admiralty
  - Walter Edwards, Civil Lord
  - Sir James Lithgow, 1st Baronet, Controller of Merchant Shipbuilding and Repairs
  - Sir Henry Vaughan Markham, Permanent Secretary of the Admiralty
- 21 January 1946: Commission
  - A. V. Alexander, First Lord
  - Andrew Cunningham, 1st Baron Cunningham of Hyndhope, First Sea Lord
  - Sir Charles Kennedy-Purvis, Deputy First Sea Lord
  - Sir Algernon Willis, Second Sea Lord
  - Charles Daniel, Third Sea Lord
  - Douglas Fisher, Fourth Sea Lord
  - Sir Thomas Hope Troubridge, Fifth Sea Lord
  - Sir Rhoderick McGrigor, Vice Chief of Naval Staff
  - John Dugdale, Parliamentary and Financial Secretary to the Admiralty
  - Walter Edwards, Civil Lord
  - Sir James Lithgow, 1st Baronet, Controller of Merchant Shipbuilding and Repairs
  - Sir Henry Vaughan Markham, Permanent Secretary of the Admiralty
- 1 February 1946: Commission
  - A. V. Alexander, First Lord
  - Andrew Cunningham, 1st Viscount Cunningham of Hyndhope, First Sea Lord
  - Sir Charles Kennedy-Purvis, Deputy First Sea Lord
  - Sir Algernon Willis, Second Sea Lord
  - Charles Daniel, Third Sea Lord
  - Sir Douglas Fisher, Fourth Sea Lord
  - Sir Thomas Troubridge, Fifth Sea Lord
  - Sir Rhoderick McGrigor, Vice Chief of Naval Staff
  - John Dugdale, Parliamentary and Financial Secretary to the Admiralty
  - Walter Edwards, Civil Lord
  - Sir Henry Vaughan Markham, Permanent Secretary of the Admiralty
- 27 February 1946: Commission
  - A. V. Alexander, First Lord
  - Andrew Cunningham, 1st Viscount Cunningham of Hyndhope, First Sea Lord
  - Sir Charles Kennedy-Purvis, Deputy First Sea Lord
  - Sir Arthur Power, Second Sea Lord
  - Charles Daniel, Third Sea Lord
  - Sir Douglas Fisher, Fourth Sea Lord
  - Sir Thomas Troubridge, Fifth Sea Lord
  - Sir Rhoderick McGrigor, Vice Chief of Naval Staff
  - John Dugdale, Parliamentary and Financial Secretary to the Admiralty
  - Walter Edwards, Civil Lord
  - Sir Henry Vaughan Markham, Permanent Secretary of the Admiralty
- 15 April 1946: Commission
  - A. V. Alexander, First Lord
  - Andrew Cunningham, 1st Viscount Cunningham of Hyndhope, First Sea Lord
  - Sir Arthur Power, Second Sea Lord
  - Charles Daniel, Third Sea Lord
  - Sir Douglas Fisher, Fourth Sea Lord
  - Sir Thomas Troubridge, Fifth Sea Lord
  - Sir Rhoderick McGrigor, Vice Chief of Naval Staff
  - Robert Oliver, Deputy Chief of Naval Staff
  - John Dugdale, Parliamentary and Financial Secretary to the Admiralty
  - Walter Edwards, Civil Lord
  - Sir Henry Vaughan Markham, Permanent Secretary of the Admiralty
- 10 June 1946: Commission
  - A. V. Alexander, First Lord
  - Sir John Cunningham, First Sea Lord
  - Sir Arthur Power, Second Sea Lord
  - Charles Daniel, Third Sea Lord
  - Sir Douglas Fisher, Fourth Sea Lord
  - Sir Thomas Troubridge, Fifth Sea Lord
  - Sir Rhoderick McGrigor, Vice Chief of Naval Staff
  - Robert Oliver, Deputy Chief of Naval Staff
  - John Dugdale, Parliamentary and Financial Secretary to the Admiralty
  - Walter Edwards, Civil Lord
  - Sir Henry Vaughan Markham, Permanent Secretary of the Admiralty
- 23 September 1946: Commission
  - A. V. Alexander, First Lord
  - Sir John Cunningham, First Sea Lord
  - Sir Arthur Power, Second Sea Lord
  - Charles Daniel, Third Sea Lord
  - Sir Douglas Fisher, Fourth Sea Lord
  - Sir Philip Vian, Fifth Sea Lord
  - Rhoderick McGrigor, Vice Chief of Naval Staff
  - Robert Oliver, Deputy Chief of Naval Staff
  - John Dugdale, Parliamentary and Financial Secretary to the Admiralty
  - Walter Edwards, Civil Lord
  - Sir Henry Vaughan Markham, Permanent Secretary of the Admiralty
- 7 October 1946: Commission
  - George Hall, First Lord
  - Sir John Cunningham, First Sea Lord
  - Sir Arthur Power, Second Sea Lord
  - Charles Daniel, Third Sea Lord
  - Sir Douglas Fisher, Fourth Sea Lord
  - Sir Philip Vian, Fifth Sea Lord
  - Sir Rhoderick McGrigor, Vice Chief of Naval Staff
  - Robert Oliver, Deputy Chief of Naval Staff
  - John Dugdale, Parliamentary and Financial Secretary to the Admiralty
  - Walter Edwards, Civil Lord
  - Sir Henry Vaughan Markham, Permanent Secretary to the Admiralty
- 8 January 1947: Commission
  - George Hall, 1st Viscount Hall, First Lord
  - Sir John Cunningham, First Sea Lord
  - Sir Arthur Power, Second Sea Lord
  - Charles Daniel, Third Sea Lord
  - Sir Douglas Fisher, Fourth Sea Lord
  - Sir Philip Vian, Fifth Sea Lord
  - Sir Rhoderick McGrigor, Vice Chief of Naval Staff
  - Robert Oliver, Deputy Chief of Naval Staff
  - John Dugdale, Parliamentary and Financial Secretary to the Admiralty
  - Walter Edwards, Civil Lord
  - Sir John Lang, Permanent Secretary of the Admiralty
- 25 April 1947: Commission
  - George Hall, 1st Viscount Hall, First Lord
  - Sir John Cunningham, First Sea Lord
  - Sir Arthur Power, Second Sea Lord
  - Charles Daniel, Third Sea Lord
  - Sir Douglas Fisher, Fourth Sea Lord
  - Sir Philip Vian, Fifth Sea Lord
  - Sir Rhoderick McGrigor, Vice Chief of Naval Staff
  - Geoffrey Oliver, Assistant Chief of Naval Staff
  - John Dugdale, Parliamentary and Financial Secretary to the Admiralty
  - Walter Edwards, Civil Lord
  - Sir John Lang, Permanent Secretary of the Admiralty
- 14 October 1947: Commission
  - George Hall, 1st Viscount Hall, First Lord
  - Sir John Cunningham, First Sea Lord
  - Sir Arthur Power, Second Sea Lord
  - Charles Daniel, Third Sea Lord
  - Sir Douglas Fisher, Fourth Sea Lord
  - Sir Philip Vian, Fifth Sea Lord
  - Sir John Edelsten, Vice Chief of Naval Staff
  - Geoffrey Oliver, Assistant Chief of Naval Staff
  - John Dugdale, Parliamentary and Financial Secretary to the Admiralty
  - Walter Edwards, Civil Lord
  - Sir John Lang, Permanent Secretary of the Admiralty
- 8 March 1948: Commission
  - George Hall, 1st Viscount Hall, First Lord
  - Sir John Cunningham, First Sea Lord
  - Sir Cecil Harcourt, Second Sea Lord
  - Charles Daniel, Third Sea Lord
  - Sir Douglas Fisher, Fourth Sea Lord
  - Sir Philip Vian, Fifth Sea Lord
  - Sir John Edelsten, Vice Chief of Naval Staff
  - Geoffrey Oliver, Assistant Chief of Naval Staff
  - John Dugdale, Parliamentary and Financial Secretary to the Admiralty
  - Walter Edwards, Civil Lord
  - Sir John Lang, Permanent Secretary of the Admiralty
- 30 March 1948: Commission
  - George Hall, 1st Viscount Hall, First Lord
  - Sir John Cunningham, First Sea Lord
  - Sir Cecil Harcourt, Second Sea Lord
  - Sir Charles Daniel, Third Sea Lord
  - Herbert Annesley Packer, Fourth Sea Lord
  - Sir Philip Vian, Fifth Sea Lord
  - Sir John Edelsten, Vice Chief of Naval Staff
  - Geoffrey Oliver, Assistant Chief of Naval Staff
  - John Dugdale, Parliamentary and Financial Secretary to the Admiralty
  - Walter Edwards, Civil Lord
  - Sir John Lang, Permanent Secretary of the Admiralty
- 16 August 1948: Commission
  - George Hall, 1st Viscount Hall, First Lord
  - Sir John Cunningham, First Sea Lord
  - Sir Cecil Harcourt, Second Sea Lord
  - Sir Charles Daniel, Third Sea Lord
  - Herbert Annesley Packer, Fourth Sea Lord
  - Sir Philip Vian, Fifth Sea Lord
  - Sir John Edelsten, Vice Chief of Naval Staff
  - Ralph Edwards, Assistant Chief of Naval Staff
  - John Dugdale, Parliamentary and Financial Secretary to the Admiralty
  - Walter Edwards, Civil Lord
  - Sir John Lang, Permanent Secretary of the Admiralty
- 29 September 1948: Commission
  - George Hall, 1st Viscount Hall, First Lord
  - Bruce Fraser, 1st Baron Fraser of North Cape, First Sea Lord
  - Sir Cecil Harcourt, Second Sea Lord
  - Sir Charles Daniel, Third Sea Lord
  - Herbert Annesley Packer, Fourth Sea Lord
  - George Creasy, Fifth Sea Lord
  - Sir John Edelsten, Vice Chief of Naval Staff
  - Ralph Edwards, Assistant Chief of Naval Staff
  - John Dugdale, Parliamentary and Financial Secretary to the Admiralty
  - Walter Edwards, Civil Lord
  - Sir John Lang, Permanent Secretary of the Admiralty
- 4 June 1949: Commission
  - George Hall, 1st Viscount Hall, First Lord
  - Bruce Fraser, 1st Baron Fraser of North Cape, First Sea Lord
  - Sir Cecil Harcourt, Second Sea Lord
  - Michael Denny, Third Sea Lord
  - Herbert Annesley Packer, Fourth Sea Lord
  - Sir George Creasy, Fifth Sea Lord
  - Sir John Edelsten, Vice Chief of Naval Staff
  - Ralph Edwards, Assistant Chief of Naval Staff
  - John Dugdale, Parliamentary and Financial Secretary to the Admiralty
  - Walter Edwards, Civil Lord
  - Sir John Lang, Permanent Secretary of the Admiralty
- 21 October 1949: Commission
  - George Hall, 1st Viscount Hall, First Lord
  - Bruce Fraser, 1st Baron Fraser of North Cape, First Sea Lord
  - Sir Cecil Harcourt, Second Sea Lord
  - Michael Denny, Third Sea Lord
  - Herbert Annesley Packer, Fourth Sea Lord
  - Maurice Mansergh, Fifth Sea Lord
  - Sir John Edelsten, Vice Chief of Naval Staff
  - Ralph Edwards, Assistant Chief of Naval Staff
  - John Dugdale, Parliamentary and Financial Secretary to the Admiralty
  - Walter Edwards, Civil Lord
  - Sir John Lang, Permanent Secretary of the Admiralty
- 30 November 1949: Commission
  - George Hall, 1st Viscount Hall, First Lord
  - Bruce Fraser, 1st Baron Fraser of North Cape, First Sea Lord
  - Sir Cecil Harcourt, Second Sea Lord
  - Michael Denny, Third Sea Lord
  - Herbert Annesley Packer, Fourth Sea Lord
  - Maurice Mansergh, Fifth Sea Lord
  - Sir George Creasy, Vice Chief of Naval Staff
  - Ralph Edwards, Assistant Chief of Naval Staff
  - John Dugdale, Parliamentary and Financial Secretary to the Admiralty
  - Walter Edwards, Civil Lord
  - Sir John Lang, Permanent Secretary of the Admiralty
- 3 March 1950: Commission
  - George Hall, 1st Viscount Hall, First Lord
  - Bruce Fraser, 1st Baron Fraser of North Cape, First Sea Lord
  - Sir Cecil Harcourt, Second Sea Lord
  - Michael Denny, Third Sea Lord
  - Herbert Annesley Packer, Fourth Sea Lord
  - Maurice Mansergh, Fifth Sea Lord
  - Sir George Creasy, Vice Chief of Naval Staff
  - Ralph Edwards, Assistant Chief of Naval Staff
  - James Callaghan, Parliamentary and Financial Secretary to the Admiralty
  - Walter Edwards, Civil Lord
  - Sir John Lang, Permanent Secretary of the Admiralty
- 21 July 1950: Commission
  - George Hall, 1st Viscount Hall, First Lord
  - Bruce Fraser, 1st Baron Fraser of North Cape, First Sea Lord
  - Sir Cecil Harcourt, Second Sea Lord
  - Sir Michael Denny, Third Sea Lord
  - Louis Mountbatten, 1st Earl Mountbatten of Burma, Fourth Sea Lord
  - Maurice Mansergh, Fifth Sea Lord
  - Sir George Creasy, Vice Chief of Naval Staff
  - Ralph Edwards, Assistant Chief of Naval Staff
  - James Callaghan, Parliamentary and Financial Secretary to the Admiralty
  - Walter Edwards, Civil Lord
  - Sir John Lang, Permanent·Secretary of the Admiralty
- 25 September 1950: Commission
  - George Hall, 1st Viscount Hall, First Lord
  - Bruce Fraser, 1st Baron Fraser of North Cape, First Sea Lord
  - Alexander Madden, Second Sea Lord
  - Sir Michael Denny, Third Sea Lord
  - Louis Mountbatten, 1st Earl Mountbatten of Burma, Fourth Sea Lord
  - Maurice Mansergh, Fifth Sea Lord
  - Sir George Creasy, Vice Chief of Naval Staff
  - Ralph Edwards, Assistant Chief of Naval Staff
  - James Callaghan, Parliamentary and Financial Secretary to the Admiralty
  - Walter Edwards, Civil Lord
  - Sir John Lang, Permanent Secretary of the Admiralty
- 11 December 1950: Commission
  - George Hall, 1st Viscount Hall, First Lord
  - Bruce Fraser, 1st Baron Fraser of North Cape, First Sea Lord
  - Alexander Madden, Second Sea Lord
  - Sir Michael Denny, Third Sea Lord
  - Louis Mountbatten, 1st Earl Mountbatten of Burma, Fourth Sea Lord
  - Maurice Mansergh, Fifth Sea Lord
  - Sir George Creasy, Vice Chief of Naval Staff
  - Edward Evans-Lombe, Assistant Chief of Naval Staff
  - James Callaghan, Parliamentary and Financial Secretary to the Admiralty
  - Walter Edwards, Civil Lord
  - Sir John Lang, Permanent Secretary to the Admiralty
- 30 May 1951: Commission
  - Frank Pakenham, Baron Pakenham, First Lord
  - Bruce Fraser, 1st Baron Fraser of North Cape, First Sea Lord
  - Alexander Madden, Second Sea Lord
  - Sir Michael Denny, Third Sea Lord
  - Louis Mountbatten, 1st Earl Mountbatten of Burma, Fourth Sea Lord
  - Maurice Mansergh, Fifth Sea Lord
  - Sir George Creasy, Vice Chief of Naval Staff
  - Edward Evans-Lombe, Assistant Chief of Naval Staff
  - James Callaghan, Parliamentary and Financial Secretary to the Admiralty
  - Walter Edwards, Civil Lord
  - Sir John Lang, Permanent Secretary of the Admiralty
- 4 October 1951: Commission
  - Frank Pakenham, Baron Pakenham, First Lord
  - Bruce Fraser, 1st Baron Fraser of North Cape, First Sea Lord
  - Alexander Madden, Second Sea Lord
  - Sir Michael Denny, Third Sea Lord
  - Louis Mountbatten, 1st Earl Mountbatten of Burma, Fourth Sea Lord
  - Edmund Anstice, Fifth Sea Lord
  - Guy Grantham, Vice Chief of Naval Staff
  - Edward Evans-Lombe, Assistant Chief of Naval Staff
  - James Callaghan, Parliamentary and Financial Secretary to the Admiralty
  - Walter Edwards, Civil Lord
  - Sir John Lang, Permanent Secretary of the Admiralty
- 5 November 1951: Commission
  - James Thomas, First Lord
  - Bruce Fraser, 1st Baron Fraser of North Cape, First Sea Lord
  - Alexander Madden, Second Sea Lord
  - Sir Michael Denny, Third Sea Lord
  - Louis Mountbatten, 1st Earl Mountbatten of Burma, Fourth Sea Lord
  - Edmund Anstice, Fifth Sea Lord
  - Guy Grantham, Vice Chief of Naval Staff
  - Edward Evans-Lombe, Assistant Chief of Naval Staff
  - Allan Noble, Parliamentary and Financial Secretary to the Admiralty
  - Walter Edwards, Civil Lord
  - Sir John Lang, Permanent Secretary of the Admiralty
- 20 December 1951: Commission
  - James Thomas, First Lord
  - Sir Rhoderick McGrigor, First Sea Lord
  - Alexander Madden, Second Sea Lord
  - Sir Michael Denny, Third Sea Lord
  - Louis Mountbatten, 1st Earl Mountbatten of Burma, Fourth Sea Lord
  - Edmund Anstice, Fifth Sea Lord
  - Guy Grantham, Vice Chief of Naval Staff
  - Edward Evans-Lombe, Assistant Chief of Naval Staff
  - Allan Noble, Parliamentary and Financial Secretary to the Admiralty
  - Simon Wingfield Digby, Civil Lord
  - Sir John Lang, Permanent Secretary to the Admiralty
- 8 February 1952: Commission
  - James Thomas, First Lord
  - Sir Rhoderick McGrigor, First Sea Lord
  - Alexander Madden, Second Sea Lord
  - Sir Michael Denny, Third Sea Lord
  - Sydney Raw, Fourth Sea Lord
  - Edmund Anstice, Fifth Sea Lord
  - Guy Grantham, Vice Chief of Naval Staff
  - Edward Evans-Lombe, Assistant Chief of Naval Staff
  - Allan Noble, Parliamentary and Financial Secretary to the Admiralty
  - Simon Wingfield Digby, Civil Lord
  - Sir John Lang, Permanent Secretary of the Admiralty
- 6 January 1953: Commission
  - James Thomas, First Lord
  - Sir Rhoderick McGrigor, First Sea Lord
  - Alexander Madden, Second Sea Lord
  - Sir Michael Denny, Third Sea Lord
  - Sydney Raw, Fourth Sea Lord
  - Edmund Anstice, Fifth Sea Lord
  - Guy Grantham, Vice Chief of Naval Staff
  - Geoffrey Barnard, Assistant Chief of Naval Staff
  - Allan Noble, Parliamentary and Financial Secretary to the Admiralty
  - Simon Wingfield Digby, Civil Lord
  - Sir John Lang, Permanent Secretary of the Admiralty
- 7 April 1953: Commission
  - James Thomas, First Lord
  - Sir Rhoderick McGrigor, First Sea Lord
  - Alexander Madden, Second Sea Lord
  - Ralph Edwards, Third Sea Lord
  - Sydney Raw, Fourth Sea Lord
  - Edmund Anstice, Fifth Sea Lord
  - Guy Grantham, Vice Chief of Naval Staff
  - Geoffrey Barnard, Assistant Chief of Naval Staff
  - Allan Noble, Parliamentary and Financial Secretary to the Admiralty
  - Simon Wingfield Digby, Civil Lord
  - Sir John Lang, Permanent Secretary of the Admiralty
- 1 September 1953: Commission
  - James Thomas, First Lord
  - Sir Rhoderick McGrigor, First Sea Lord
  - Sir Guy Russell, Second Sea Lord
  - Ralph Edwards, Third Sea Lord
  - Sydney Raw, Fourth Sea Lord
  - Sir Edmund Anstice, Fifth Sea Lord
  - Guy Grantham, Vice Chief of Naval Staff
  - Geoffrey Barnard, Assistant Chief of Naval Staff
  - Allan Noble, Parliamentary and Financial Secretary of the Admiralty
  - Simon Wingfield Digby, Civil Lord
  - Sir John Lang, Permanent Secretary to the Admiralty
- 5 April 1954: Commission
  - James Thomas, First Lord
  - Sir Rhoderick McGrigor, First Sea Lord
  - Sir Guy Russell, Second Sea Lord
  - Ralph Edwards, Third Sea Lord
  - Frederick Parham, Fourth Sea Lord
  - Sir Edmund Anstice, Fifth Sea Lord
  - Guy Grantham, Vice Chief of Naval Staff
  - Geoffrey Barnard, Assistant Chief of Naval Staff
  - Allan Noble, Parliamentary and Financial Secretary to the Admiralty
  - Simon Wingfield Digby, Civil Lord
  - Sir John Lang, Permanent Secretary of the Admiralty
- 12 April 1954: Commission
  - James Thomas, First Lord
  - Sir Rhoderick McGrigor, First Sea Lord
  - Sir Guy Russell, Second Sea Lord
  - Ralph Edwards, Third Sea Lord
  - Frederick Parham, Fourth Sea Lord
  - Sir Edmund Anstice, Fifth Sea Lord
  - William Davis, Vice Chief of Naval Staff
  - Geoffrey Barnard, Assistant Chief of Naval Staff
  - Allan Noble, Parliamentary and Financial Secretary to the Admiralty
  - Simon Wingfield Digby, Civil Lord
  - Sir John Lang, Permanent Secretary of the Admiralty
- 18 April 1955: Commission
  - James Thomas, First Lord
  - Louis Mountbatten, 1st Earl Mountbatten of Burma, First Sea Lord
  - Sir Guy Russell, Second Sea Lord
  - Ralph Edwards, Third Sea Lord
  - Frederick Parham, Fourth Sea Lord
  - Alexander Bingley, Fifth Sea Lord
  - William Davis, Vice Chief of Naval Staff
  - Eric Clifford, Assistant Chief of Naval Staff
  - Allan Noble, Parliamentary and Financial Secretary to the Admiralty
  - Simon Wingfield Digby, Civil Lord
  - Sir John Lang, Permanent Secretary of the Admiralty
- 12 September 1955: Commission
  - James Thomas, First Lord
  - Louis Mountbatten, 1st Earl Mountbatten of Burma, First Sea Lord
  - Sir Guy Russell, Second Sea Lord
  - Ralph Edwards, Third Sea Lord
  - Dymock Watson, Fourth Sea Lord
  - Alexander Bingley, Fifth Sea Lord
  - William Davis, Vice Chief of Naval Staff
  - Eric Clifford, Assistant Chief of Naval Staff
  - Allan Noble, Parliamentary and Financial Secretary to the Admiralty
  - Simon Wingfield Digby, Civil Lord
  - Sir John Lang, Permanent Secretary of the Admiralty
- 22 December 1955: Commission
  - James Thomas, First Lord
  - Louis Mountbatten, 1st Earl Mountbatten of Burma, First Sea Lord
  - Sir Charles Lambe, Second Sea Lord
  - Ralph Edwards, Third Sea Lord
  - Dymock Watson, Fourth Sea Lord
  - Alexander Bingley, Fifth Sea Lord
  - William Davis, Vice Chief of Naval Staff
  - Eric Clifford, Assistant Chief of Naval Staff
  - George Ward, Parliamentary and Financial Secretary to the Admiralty
  - Simon Wingfield Digby, Civil Lord
  - Sir John Lang, Permanent Secretary of the Admiralty
- 19 October 1956: Commission
  - Quintin Hogg, 2nd Viscount Hailsham, First Lord
  - Louis Mountbatten, 1st Earl Mountbatten of Burma, First Sea Lord
  - Sir Charles Lambe, Second Sea Lord
  - Peter Reid, Third Sea Lord
  - Dymock Watson, Fourth Sea Lord
  - Alexander Bingley, Fifth Sea Lord
  - Sir William Davis, Vice Chief of Naval Staff
  - Sir Eric Clifford, Assistant Chief of Naval Staff
  - George Ward, Parliamentary and Financial Secretary to the Admiralty
  - Simon Wingfield Digby, Civil Lord
  - Sir John Lang, Permanent Secretary of the Admiralty
- 14 October 1957: Commission
  - George Douglas-Hamilton, 10th Earl of Selkirk, First Lord
  - Louis Mountbatten, 1st Earl Mountbatten of Burma, First Sea Lord
  - Deric Holland-Martin, Second Sea Lord
  - Sir Peter Reid, Third Sea Lord
  - Dymock Watson, Fourth Sea Lord
  - Sir Caspar John, Vice Chief of Naval Staff
  - Alexander Bingley, Assistant Chief of Naval Staff
  - Christopher Soames, Parliamentary and Financial Secretary to the Admiralty
  - Tam Galbraith, Civil Lord
  - Sir John Lang, Permanent Secretary of the Admiralty
- 17 January 1958: Commission
  - George Douglas-Hamilton, 10th Earl of Selkirk, First Lord
  - Louis Mountbatten, 1st Earl Mountbatten of Burma, First Sea Lord
  - Deric Holland-Martin, Second Sea Lord
  - Sir Peter Reid, Third Sea Lord
  - Sir Gordon Hubback, Fourth Sea Lord
  - Sir Caspar John, Vice Chief of Naval Staff
  - Manley Laurence Power, Assistant Chief of Naval Staff
  - Robert Allan, Parliamentary and Financial Secretary to the Admiralty
  - Tam Galbraith, Civil Lord
  - Sir John Lang, Permanent Secretary of the Admiralty
- 20 January 1959: Commission
  - George Douglas-Hamilton, 10th Earl of Selkirk, First Lord
  - Louis Mountbatten, 1st Earl Mountbatten of Burma, First Sea Lord
  - Deric Holland-Martin, Second Sea Lord
  - Sir Peter Reid, Third Sea Lord
  - Nicholas Copeman, Fourth Sea Lord
  - Sir Caspar John, Vice Chief of Naval Staff
  - Sir Manley Power, Assistant Chief of Naval Staff
  - Ian Orr-Ewing, Parliamentary and Financial Secretary of the Admiralty
  - Tam Galbraith, Civil Lord
  - Sir John Lang, Permanent Secretary to the Admiralty
- 17 February 1959: Commission
  - George Douglas-Hamilton, 10th Earl of Selkirk, First Lord
  - Louis Mountbatten, 1st Earl Mountbatten of Burma, First Sea Lord
  - Deric Holland-Martin, Second Sea Lord
  - Sir Peter Reid, Third Sea Lord
  - Nicholas Copeman, Fourth Sea Lord
  - Sir Caspar John, Vice Chief of Naval Staff
  - Laurence Durlacher, Assistant Chief of Naval Staff
  - Ian Orr-Ewing, Parliamentary and Financial Secretary of the Admiralty
  - Tam Galbraith, Civil Lord
  - Sir John Lang, Permanent Secretary of the Admiralty
- 19 October 1959: Commission
  - Peter Carington, 6th Baron Carrington, First Lord
  - Sir Charles Lambe, First Sea Lord
  - Deric Holland-Martin, Second Sea Lord
  - Sir Peter Reid, Third Sea Lord
  - Nicholas Copeman, Fourth Sea Lord
  - Sir Caspar John, Vice Chief of Naval Staff
  - Laurence Durlacher, Assistant Chief of Naval Staff
  - Ian Orr-Ewing, Civil Lord
  - Sir John Lang, Permanent Secretary of the Admiralty
- 9 December 1959: Commission
  - Peter Carington, 6th Baron Carrington, First Lord
  - Sir Charles Lambe, First Sea Lord
  - Sir St John Tyrwhitt, 2nd Baronet, Second Sea Lord
  - Sir Peter Reid, Third Sea Lord
  - Nicholas Copeman, Fourth Sea Lord
  - Sir Caspar John, Vice Chief of Naval Staff
  - Laurence Durlacher, Assistant Chief of Naval Staff
  - Ian Orr-Ewing, Civil Lord
  - Sir John Lang, Permanent Secretary of the Admiralty
- 23 May 1960: Commission
  - Peter Carington, 6th Baron Carrington, First Lord
  - Sir Caspar John, First Sea Lord
  - Sir St John Tyrwhitt, 2nd Baronet, Second Sea Lord
  - Sir Peter Reid, Third Sea Lord
  - Nicholas Copeman, Fourth Sea Lord
  - Sir Walter Couchman, Vice Chief of Naval Staff
  - Laurence Durlacher, Assistant Chief of Naval Staff
  - Ian Orr-Ewing, Civil Lord
  - Sir John Lang, Permanent Secretary of the Admiralty
- 10 January 1961: Commission
  - Peter Carington, 6th Baron Carrington, First Lord
  - Sir Caspar John, First Sea Lord
  - Sir St John Tyrwhitt, 2nd Baronet, Second Sea Lord
  - Sir Peter Reid, Third Sea Lord
  - Michael Villiers, Fourth Sea Lord
  - Varyl Begg, Vice Chief of Naval Staff
  - Laurence Durlacher, Assistant Chief of Naval Staff
  - Ian Orr-Ewing, Civil Lord
  - Sir John Lang, Permanent Secretary of the Admiralty
- 1 April 1961: Commission
  - Peter Carington, 6th Baron Carrington, First Lord
  - Sir Caspar John, First Sea Lord
  - Sir St John Tyrwhitt, 2nd Baronet, Second Sea Lord
  - Sir Peter Reid, Third Sea Lord
  - Michael Villiers, Fourth Sea Lord
  - Varyl Begg, Vice Chief of Naval Staff
  - Laurence Durlacher, Assistant Chief of Naval Staff
  - Ian Orr-Ewing, Civil Lord
  - Sir Clifford Jarrett, Permanent Secretary of the Admiralty
- 28 September 1961: Commission
  - Peter Carington, 6th Baron Carrington, First Lord
  - Sir Caspar John, First Sea Lord
  - Sir Royston Wright, Second Sea Lord
  - Sir Peter Reid, Third Sea Lord
  - Michael Villiers, Fourth Sea Lord
  - Varyl Begg, Vice Chief of Naval Staff
  - Laurence Durlacher, Assistant Chief of Naval Staff
  - Ian Orr-Ewing, Civil Lord
  - Sir Clifford Jarrett, Permanent Secretary of the Admiralty
- 1 November 1961: Commission
  - Peter Carington, 6th Baron Carrington, First Lord
  - Sir Caspar John, First Sea Lord
  - Sir Royston Wright, Second Sea Lord
  - Michael Le Fanu, Third Sea Lord
  - Michael Villiers, Fourth Sea Lord
  - Varyl Begg, Vice Chief of Naval Staff
  - Laurence Durlacher, Assistant Chief of Naval Staff
  - Ian Orr-Ewing, Civil Lord
  - Sir Clifford Jarrett, Permanent Secretary of the Admiralty
- 3 January 1962: Commission
  - Peter Carington, 6th Baron Carrington, First Lord
  - Sir Caspar John, First Sea Lord
  - Sir Royston Wright, Second Sea Lord
  - Michael Le Fanu, Third Sea Lord
  - Michael Villiers, Fourth Sea Lord
  - Varyl Begg, Vice Chief of Naval Staff
  - Peter Gretton, Assistant Chief of Naval Staff
  - Ian Orr-Ewing, Civil Lord
  - Sir Clifford Jarrett, Permanent Secretary of the Admiralty
- 30 January 1963: Commission
  - Peter Carington, 6th Baron Carrington, First Lord
  - Sir Caspar John, First Sea Lord
  - Sir Royston Wright, Second Sea Lord
  - Michael Le Fanu, Third Sea Lord
  - Sir Michael Villiers, Fourth Sea Lord
  - Sir Varyl Begg, Vice Chief of Naval Staff
  - Frank Hopkins, Assistant Chief of Naval Staff
  - Ian Orr-Ewing, Civil Lord
  - Sir Clifford Jarrett, Permanent Secretary of the Admiralty
- 15 February 1963: Commission
  - Peter Carington, 6th Baron Carrington, First Lord
  - Sir Caspar John, First Sea Lord
  - Sir Royston Wright, Second Sea Lord
  - Michael Le Fanu, Third Sea Lord
  - Sir Michael Villiers, Fourth Sea Lord
  - John Frewen, Vice Chief of Naval Staff
  - Frank Hopkins, Assistant Chief of Naval Staff
  - Ian Orr-Ewing, Civil Lord
  - Sir Clifford Jarrett, Permanent Secretary of the Admiralty
- 10 May 1963: Commission
  - Peter Carington, 6th Baron Carrington, First Lord
  - Sir Caspar John, First Sea Lord
  - Sir Royston Wright, Second Sea Lord
  - Michael Le Fanu, Third Sea Lord
  - Sir Michael Villiers, Fourth Sea Lord
  - John Frewen, Vice Chief of Naval Staff
  - Frank Hopkins, Assistant Chief of Naval Staff
  - John Albert Hay, Civil Lord
  - Sir Clifford Jarrett, Permanent Secretary of the Admiralty
- 7 August 1963: Commission
  - Peter Carington, 6th Baron Carrington, First Lord
  - Sir David Luce, First Sea Lord
  - Sir Royston Wright, Second Sea Lord
  - Michael Le Fanu, Third Sea Lord
  - Sir Michael Villiers, Fourth Sea Lord
  - John Frewen, Vice Chief of Naval Staff
  - Frank Hopkins, Assistant Chief of Naval Staff
  - John Albert Hay, Civil Lord
  - Sir Clifford Jarrett, Permanent Secretary of the Admiralty
- 21 October 1963: Commission
  - George Jellicoe, 2nd Earl Jellicoe, First Lord
  - Sir David Luce, First Sea Lord
  - Sir Royston Wright, Second Sea Lord
  - Michael Le Fanu, Third Sea Lord
  - Sir Michael Villiers, Fourth Sea Lord
  - John Frewen, Vice Chief of Naval Staff
  - Frank Hopkins, Assistant Chief of Naval Staff
  - John Albert Hay, Civil Lord
  - Sir Clifford Jarrett, Permanent Secretary of the Admiralty
- 17 February 1964: Commission
  - George Jellicoe, 2nd Earl Jellicoe, First Lord
  - Sir David Luce, First Sea Lord
  - Sir Royston Wright, Second Sea Lord
  - Michael Le Fanu, Third Sea Lord
  - Raymond Hawkins, Fourth Sea Lord
  - John Frewen, Vice Chief of Naval Staff
  - Frank Hopkins, Assistant Chief of Naval Staff
  - John Albert Hay, Civil Lord
  - Arthur Lucius Michael Cary, Permanent Secretary of the Admiralty
- 1 April 1964: Board of Admiralty abolished

== Sources ==
- Rodger, N.A.M. (1979). The Admiralty. Offices of State. Lavenham: T. Dalton Ltd. ISBN 0900963948..
- Sainty, J.C (1975). Office-Holders in Modern Britain: Volume 4 Admiralty Officials 1660–1870.
- "The Commissioners ("Lords") of the Admiralty 1828 – 1888".
- The London Gazette
