= SS Megantic =

British transatlantic ocean liner

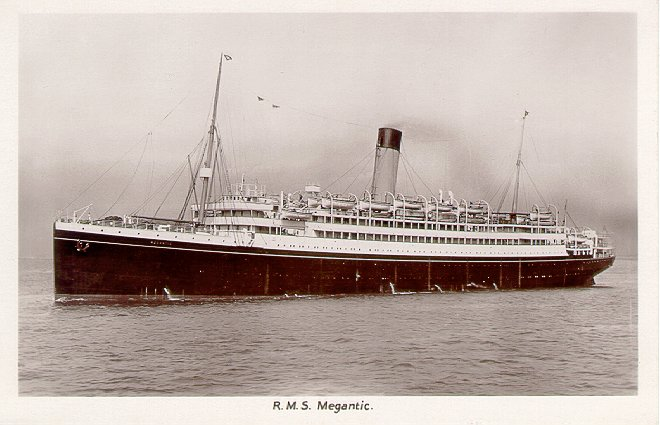
- Megantic

History

United Kingdom
- Name: Megantic
- Namesake: Lake Mégantic
- Owner: Oceanic Steam Navigation Co
- Operator: White Star Line
- Port of registry: Liverpool
- Route: 1909: Liverpool – Quebec City – Montreal; 1914: Liverpool – New York; 1919: Liverpool – Quebec City – Montreal; 1928: London – Southampton – New York
- Ordered: 1907
- Builder: Harland and Wolff, Belfast
- Yard number: 399
- Launched: 10 December 1908
- Completed: 3 June 1909
- Maiden voyage: 17 June 1909
- Refit: 1909, 1924
- Identification: UK official number 127981; Code letters HPCF; Call sign MZC
- Fate: Scrapped 1933

General characteristics
- Type: Ocean liner
- Tonnage: 14,878 GRT, 9,183 NRT, 8,790 DWT
- Displacement: 20,470 tons
- Length: 550.4 ft (167.8 m) p/p
- Beam: 67.3 ft (20.5 m)
- Depth: 41.2 ft (12.6 m)
- Decks: 3 decks, 2 partial decks
- Installed power: 1,180 NHP
- Propulsion: 2 × quadruple-expansion engines; 2 × 3 Bladed Propeller
- Speed: 17 knots (31 km/h)
- Capacity: 1909: 230 first class; 430 second class; 1,000 third class; 1919: 325 first class; 260 second class; 550 third class; 1924: 452 cabin class; 260 second class; 550 third class
- Sensors & processing systems: by 1930: submarine signalling; wireless direction finding

SS Megantic was a British transatlantic ocean liner that was built in Ireland and launched in 1908. She was one of a pair of sister ships that were ordered in 1907 by Dominion Line but completed for White Star Line.

Before the First World War her regular route was between Liverpool and Quebec City. She and her sister Laurentic were the largest ships on the route between Great Britain and Canada.

During the First World War, Megantic served as a troop ship from 1915.

Megantic was refitted in 1919 and 1924. In the 1920s and early 1930s her duties were a mixture of liner services and cruising. In 1928 Megantic's regular route was between Great Britain and New York.

Megantic was laid up in 1931 and scrapped in 1933.

== Background ==
The Dominion Line operated a transatlantic liner service between Liverpool, Quebec, Montreal and Boston. In 1902 the International Mercantile Marine Company (IMM) took over Dominion Line.

In 1905 the rival Allan Line introduced the World's first steam turbine ocean liners. RMS Victorian and Virginian were two of the swiftest ships on the route between Britain and Canada, and at more than 10,600 GRT each they were also the largest. The pair made such an impression that Allan Line won a valuable Canadian Government mail contract before the ships were even launched.

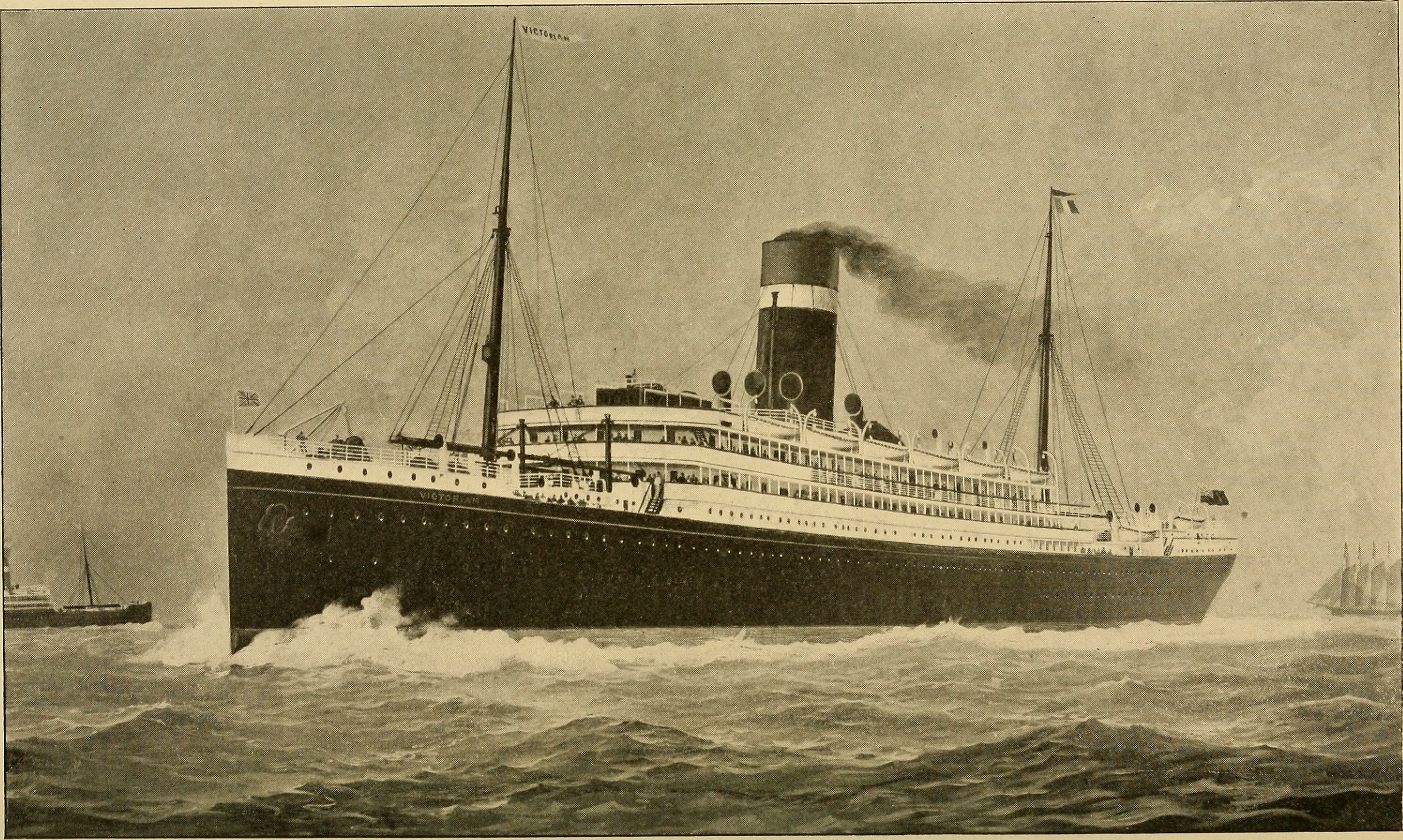
From 1905 Allan Line's Victorian and Virginian provided strong competition between Liverpool and Quebec

But like all of the earliest turbine ships, Victorian and Virginian had direct drive from their turbines to their propellers. On Virginian this caused cavitation. Virginian also acquired a reputation for rolling excessively in heavy seas. Also, the earliest steam turbines used more bunker fuel than triple- or quadruple-expansion steam engines.

In 1907 Dominion Line responded by ordering a pair of liners from Harland and Wolff. At almost 15,000 GRT each they would be larger than Victorian and Virginian, the largest ships in Dominion Line's fleet, and the largest ships on the route between Britain and Canada.

Dominion Line planned to call the ships Alberta and Albany. But before the pair were completed, IMM transferred them to another of its subsidiaries, White Star Line, and they were renamed to conform with White Star naming policy. Alberta was launched as Laurentic, and Albany was launched on 19 December 1908 months later as Megantic, after Lake Mégantic in Quebec.

Despite the change of owner, Laurentic and Megantic were still to serve the route between Liverpool and Montreal. They were White Star Line's first ships on the route.

== Building ==
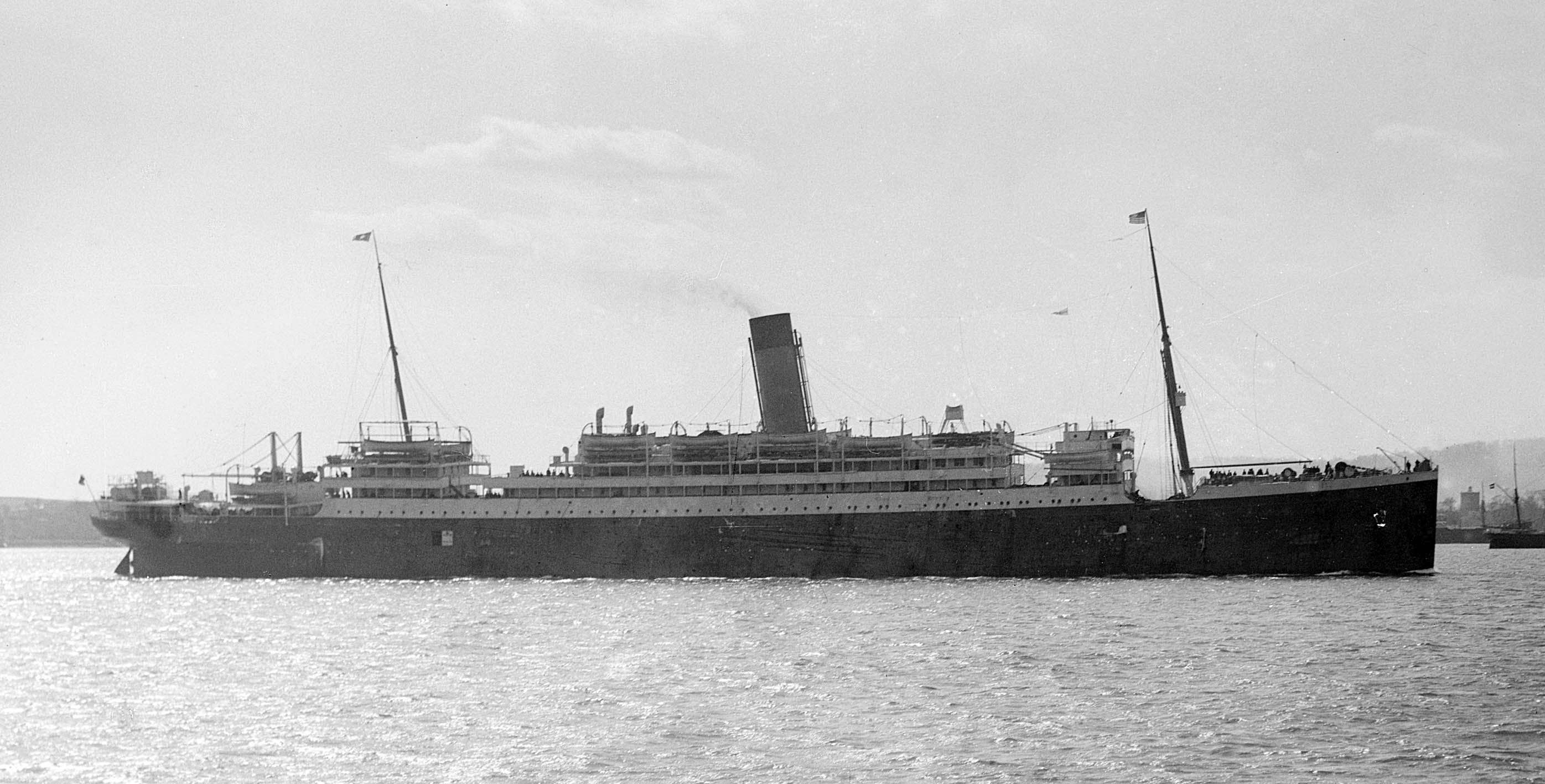
Megantic

Harland and Wolff built Megantic on slipway number seven of its South Yard in Belfast. She was completed on 3 June 1909, less than two months after Laurentic.

Laurentic was built with experimental combination of machinery which had a triple propeller arrangement of a central turbine, and two four-cylinder triple-expansion engines that drove the port and starboard propellers, the exhaust steam from their low-pressure cylinders powered the turbine.

However, Megantic was built with a conventional twin propeller installation driven by conventional quadruple-expansion engines, to provide a direct comparison with Laurentic. Between them Megantic's engines produced 1,180 NHP and gave her a speed of 17 knots (31 km/h).

Laurentic produced 20 percent more power than Megantic for the same coal consumption. For the same power output, Laurentic's coal consumption was 12 to 15 percent less than Megantic's. This led IMM to specify a similar combination of two triple-expansion engines and one low-pressure turbine for the Olympic-class ocean liners that Harland and Wolff launched in 1910 and 1911.

As built, Megantic had berths for 230 first class passengers, 430 second class and 1,000 third class.

== Service ==
The White Star and Dominion Lines provided two ships each to run a weekly joint service between Liverpool and Canada. The White Star ships were Laurentic and Megantic. The Dominion Line ships were the 10,000 GRT Canada and 7,000 GRT Dominion. On 17 June 1909 Megantic left Liverpool on her maiden voyage.

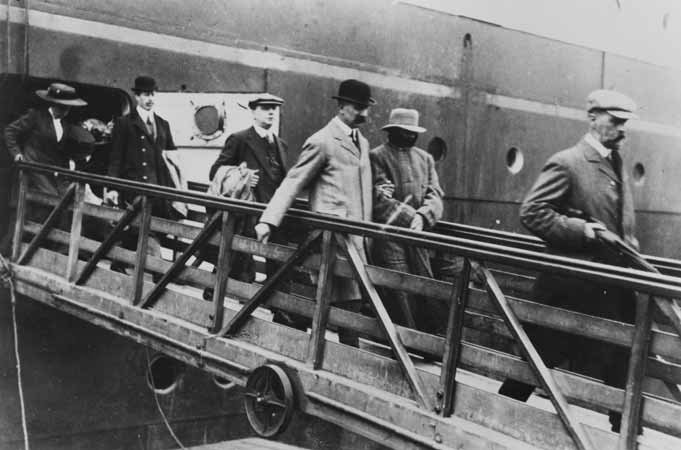
DCI Walter Dew (centre, in bowler hat) leading murder suspect HH Crippen ashore in 1910

In July 1910 Metropolitan Police DCI Walter Dew arrested murder suspect Hawley Harvey Crippen and his lover Ethel Le Neve at Rimouski aboard the Canadian Pacific liner Montrose. Dew repatriated Crippen and Le Neve to Britain aboard Megantic, reaching Liverpool on 28 August.

By 1911 Megantic was equipped for wireless telegraphy, operating on the 300 and 600 metre wavelengths. Her call sign was MZC. In March 1911 Megantic's Marconi Company wireless operator transmitted a signal 2,500 miles across the Atlantic to Poldhu Wireless Station in Cornwall. Previously the maximum range of Marconi transmitters aboard ships was thought to be about 600 miles.

When the First World War began in 1914, White Star Line briefly put Megantic on its route between Liverpool and New York. On 30 May 1915 she was on a westbound voyage from Liverpool to Montreal when a submarine chased her off the south coast of Ireland. The liner safely outpaced the submarine.

On 6 April 1917 Megantic was requisitioned for government service. She became a troop ship and carried members of the Canadian Expeditionary Force (CEF) and United States Armed Forces. After the Armistice she repatriated members of the CEF and First Australian Imperial Force.

=== 1919 refit ===
In 1919 Megantic was refitted at Belfast. Her first class accommodation was increased to 325 berths, and her second and third class were reduced to 260 and 550 berths respectively. White Star Line returned Megantic to her Liverpool – Canada route, with Dominion Line's Canada as her running mate. In the off season she made cruises to the West Indies.

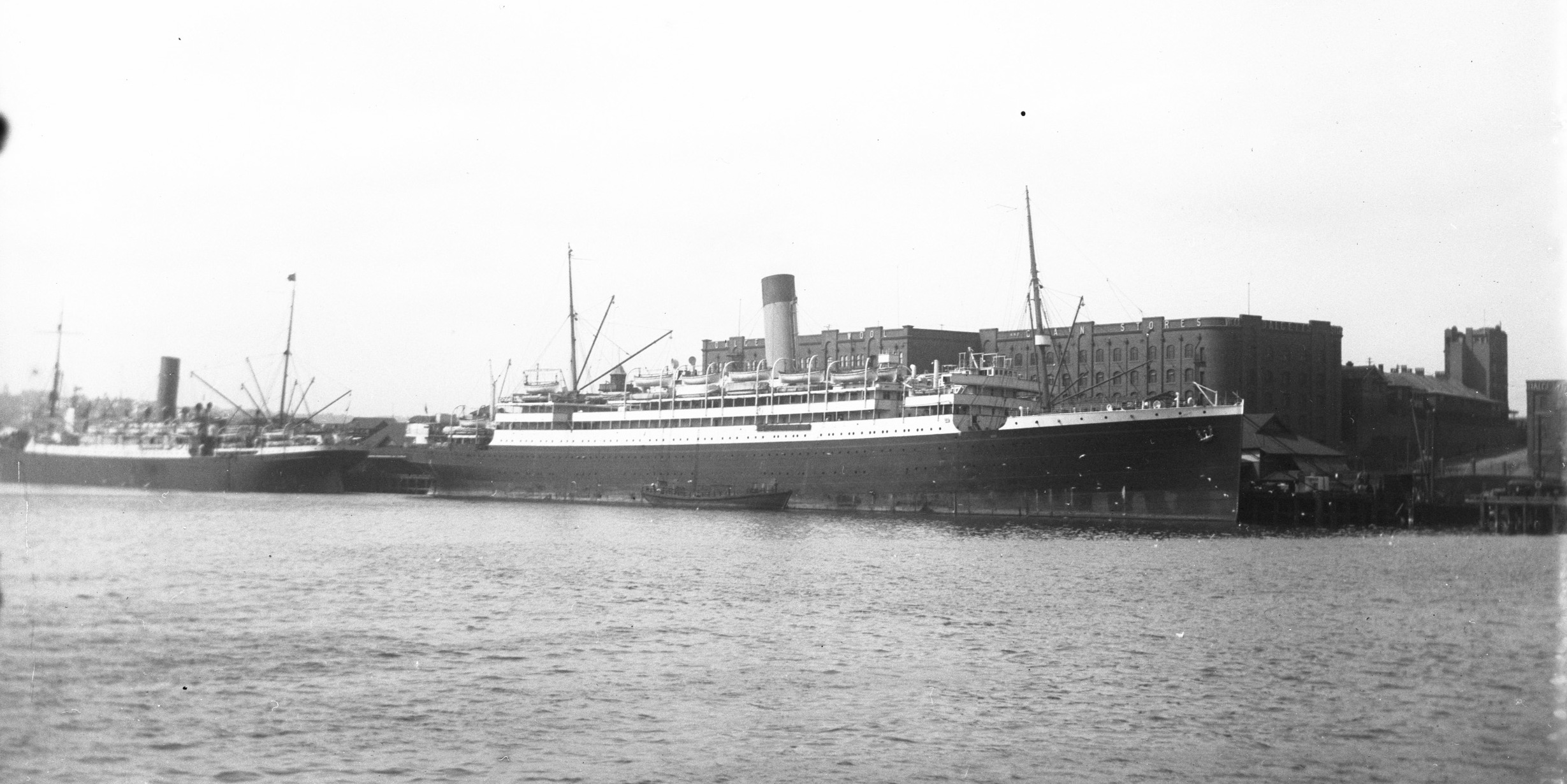
Megantic at Millers Point, Sydney in 1920

In January 1920 Megantic made one voyage on White Star's joint service with Shaw, Savill & Albion Line, whose main route was between Britain and New Zealand. Later in 1920 she made one voyage to Sydney and Wellington in government service.

=== 1924 refit ===
In 1924 Megantic's first class accommodation was converted into 452 "cabin class" berths. In January 1927 the Admiralty chartered her and had her fitted out as a troop ship to take Royal Marines to Shanghai.

In February 1928 Megantic made a Caribbean cruise that included a call at La Guaira in Venezuela. In March, White Star Line put her on the London – Le Havre – Halifax – New York route until the Saint Lawrence River thawed, and then transferred her to the route to Quebec and Montreal.

In May 1929 Megantic was in King George V Dock, London when fire broke out in her number two hold. The hold was flooded to extinguish the fire.

By 1930 Megantic's navigation equipment included wireless direction finding. In 1930 and 1931 she operated economy cruises.

On 20 July 1931 the Royal Mail Case opened at the Old Bailey, which led to the collapse of White Star Line's parent company. Megantic was laid up in the Firth of Clyde off Rothesay.

In 1933 White Star Line sold Megantic and Baltic to Japanese buyers for scrap. The sale was controversial because Japan was at war in Manchuria, and UK public opinion feared Japan could use the two liners as troop ships. Megantic was sold that January, arrived at Osaka on 7 May and was broken up at Kobe.

== Bibliography ==
- De Kerbrech, Richard (2009). Ships of the White Star Line. Shepperton: Ian Allan Publishing. ISBN 978-0-7110-3366-5.
- Dowling, R (1909) [1903]. All About Ships & Shipping (2nd ed.). London: Alexander Moring Ltd.
- Harnack, Edwin P (1930) [1903]. All About Ships & Shipping (3rd ed.). London: Faber and Faber.
- The Marconi Press Agency Ltd (1913). The Year Book of Wireless Telegraphy and Telephony. London: The St Katherine Press.
- Wilson, RM (1956). The Big Ships. London: Cassell & Co.
