= Dr. Crippen (1962 film) =

1963 British film by Robert Lynn

- Directed by: Robert Lynn
- Written by: Leigh Vance
- Produced by: John Clein
- Starring: Donald Pleasence; Coral Browne; Samantha Eggar
- Cinematography: Nicolas Roeg
- Edited by: Lee Doig
- Music by: Ken Jones
- Production company: Torchlight Productions
- Distributed by: Warner-Pathé Distributors
- Release date: 7 August 1963 (London)
- Running time: 98 minutes
- Country: United Kingdom
- Language: English

Dr. Crippen is a 1963 British biographical film directed by Robert Lynn and starring Donald Pleasence, Coral Browne and Samantha Eggar. The film's plot concerns the real-life Edwardian doctor Hawley Harvey Crippen, who was hanged in 1910 for the murder of his wife. The cinematography was by Nicolas Roeg.

== Plot ==
In late 1910, Crippen is portrayed as a downtrodden cuckold continually humiliated by his coarse, overbearing wife. There is a strong suggestion in the story that he may have been innocent of murder, possibly killing his wife by accident, and that his younger mistress Ethel Le Neve is completely ignorant of the killing. The plot ostensibly covers Crippen's trial, but the story is fleshed out with flashbacks to the doctor's relationship with his wife and his affair.

== Cast ==
- Donald Pleasence as Dr. Crippen
- Coral Browne as Belle Elmore/Cora Crippen
- Samantha Eggar as Ethel Le Neve
- Donald Wolfit as R. D. Muir
- James Robertson Justice as Captain McKenzie (Note: A fictionalisation of Captain Henry George Kendall.)
- John Arnatt as Chief Inspector Dew
- Paul Carpenter as Bruce Martin
- Oliver Johnston as Lord Chief Justice Richard Webster, 1st Viscount Alverstone
- John Lee as Harry
- Olga Lindo as Mrs. Arditti
- Elspeth March as Mrs. Jackson
- Geoffrey Toone as Mr. Tobin
- Edward Underdown as the prison governor
- Douglas Bradley-Smith as Dr. Pepper
- Hamilton Dyce as Dr. Rogers
- Basil Henson as Mr. Arditti
- Totti Truman Taylor as Miss Curnow
- Edward Cast as Harding
- Colin Rix as chemist

== Production ==
The film was one of the first roles for Samantha Eggar.

== Critical reception ==
The Monthly Film Bulletin wrote: "It is unfortunate for the generally capable team responsible for this straightforward account of the Crippen case that their material should be so familiar. It means that we expect something extra ... Well, it has its moments: Crippen's calm and resigned interview ... ; the dinner party on the evening of Belle's death, with its aura of respectable, neighbourly shock given just the right edge of absurdity ... In particlular there is a superb performance from Coral Browne as the sensual, sharp-tongued Belle, building from restless infidelity and resentment to coarse, drunken rage without once succumbing to the caricature which the part invites. Unfortunately nothing else matches up to Miss Browne. Donald Pleasence is well-cast as Crippen, but there is something monotonous and over-sinister about him which robs his scenes with Ethel of the spontaneity and passion they need. ... The production generally has an apt, if not exactly imaginative, sense of period. The music is poor."

Bosley Crowther in The New York Times wrote: "Well, one must give good scores to Mr. Pleasence, Miss Browne, Miss Eggar and the rest of the cast for giving a sense of solemnity and suffocation to this stiff tale ... But the mystery, the action and the pathos are all too academic and thin – too milky and uneventful – except for those who are real Crippen fans."

The Radio Times Guide to Films gave the film 3/5 stars, writing: "Considering the notoriously sordid subject matter, director Robert Lynn's true-crime case history should have been a far more riveting affair than this so-so account. Donald Pleasence is at his sinister best playing the monstrous doctor who murders his persecuting wife in order to elope with his typist lover. However, this remains remote and uninvolving because of the deliberately austere quasi-documentary stance."

Leslie Halliwell said: "Straightforward account of a famous and rather unsurprising Edwardian murder case; well enough made but with no special raison d'être."

Britmovie noted a "sincere historical reconstruction about the infamous Edwardian murderer blending courtroom and melodrama. The direction from TV helmer Robert Lynn is satisfactory and is brightly captured in atmospheric black-and-white by cinematographer Nicolas Roeg."
