= Frank Froest =

British writer

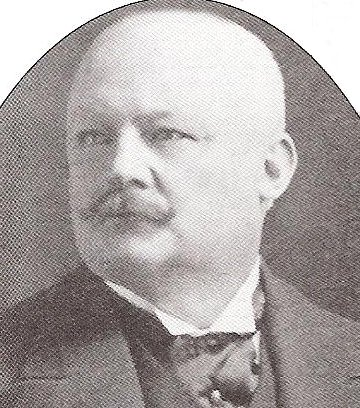
- Frank Froest c. 1912
- Born: 1858; Bristol, United Kingdom
- Died: 7 January 1930; Weston-super-Mare, Somerset
- Occupations: Police detective and crime writer

Detective Superintendent Frank Castle Froest MVO KPM (1858, Bristol – 7 January 1930, Weston-super-Mare) was a British detective and crime writer.

Froest was described by a journalist as being "...short, thick-set, full-faced, Mr. Froest in uniform looked more like a Prussian field-marshal than anything else. Out of uniform (which he generally was) he was always immaculate in silk hat, patent leather boots, and carrying a carefully rolled umbrella." Called 'the man with iron hands', Froest was incredibly strong, and could tear a pack of cards in half and snap a sixpence 'like a biscuit'.

== Police career ==
Frank Froest joined the Metropolitan Police as a police constable in 1879 and worked his way up to Inspector 2nd Class at Scotland Yard by 1894, Chief Inspector in 1903 and Superintendent of the Criminal Investigation Department (CID) of the Metropolitan Police from 1906 to his retirement in 1912.

== Famous cases ==
As one of the country's top detectives, he had important responsibilities, including the return of the disgraced financier Jabez Balfour from Argentina in 1895, in what was essentially a kidnapping. The Times obituary described him as having 'all the appearance of a prosperous and ingenuous country gentleman, but he was a man of shrewdness and resource ... highly esteemed for his professional ability'.

On 18 February 1896 Detective Inspector Froest boarded the S.S. Harlech Castle at Madeira, and arrested 26 officers and 399 other ranks who were prisoners after having taken part in the Jameson Raid. It was the largest mass arrest in the history of British law enforcement.

In 1898 Froest was involved in bringing international jewel-thief William Johnson, known as 'Harry the Valet', to justice. Johnson stole jewellery then valued at £30,000 from Mary, Dowager Duchess of Sutherland while she was travelling by train from Paris to London with her husband, Sir Albert Rollit MP, and her brother, his wife and the Duchess's footman and maid. Froest investigated the case together with Inspectors Walter Dinnie and Walter Dew. They tracked Johnson, who by now was spending large amounts of money, to lodgings in London's South Kensington. Despite receiving a seven-year prison sentence, Johnson refused to disclose the whereabouts of the Duchess's jewels, and only £4,000 worth were ever recovered.

Froest was Dew's superior officer during the hunt for Dr Crippen and his mistress Ethel Le Neve in 1910. It was on his initiative that wireless was used to organise the arrest of Dr Crippen, the first time it was used in this way.

== Later years ==
On his retirement, he was awarded an MVO and moved to Weston-super-Mare, where he became a magistrate and member of Somerset County Council. In May 1918 he was appointed Secretary Superintendent of the Royal West of England Sanatorium, Weston-super-Mare, an institution for injured soldiers and munition workers. He was the author of a number of police procedural crime stories, including The Grell Mystery (1913), along with The Crime Club (1915) and The Rogues’ Syndicate (1916) in collaboration with George Dilnot. Two of his novels, The Grell Mystery and The Maelstrom, were made into films in 1917.

He died in Weston-super-Mare, aged 73. His last resting place can be found at the old Church of St Nicholas, Uphill, Weston-super-Mare.

== Awards ==
Froest's other medals were the Jubilee Medal 1887 with clasp for 1897, Metropolitan Police issue (P.S., A Divn.), Coronation Medal 1902, Metropolitan Police (Insp., C.O. Div.); Coronation Medal 1911, Metropolitan Police (Supt.); King’s Police Medal, G.V.R., 1st issue (Frank Castle Froest, Supt., Met. Police). These sold at auction in September 2002 for £1,500.
