= Walter Dew =

British police officer (1863–1947)

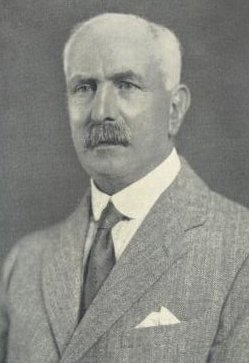
- Dew c. 1920
- Born: 7 April 1863; Hardingstone, Northamptonshire, England
- Died: 16 December 1947 (aged 84); Worthing, England
- Resting place: Durrington Cemetery, Worthing
- Occupation: Metropolitan Police officer
- Known for: Jack the Ripper and Dr Crippen cases

Detective Chief Inspector Walter Dew (17 April 1863 – 16 December 1947) was a British Metropolitan Police officer who was involved in the hunt for both Jack the Ripper and Dr Crippen.

== Early life ==
Dew was born at Far Cotton, in Hardingstone, Northamptonshire, one of seven children to Walter Dew Sr (ca 1822–1884), a railway guard, and his wife Eliza (ca 1832–1914). His family moved to London when he was 10. As a boy Dew was not a natural scholar, and left school aged 13. As a youth Dew found employment in a solicitor's office off Chancery Lane, but not liking the work he became a junior clerk at the offices of a seed-merchant in Holborn. Later, he followed his father on to the railways, for on the 1881 census he is listed as a 17-year-old railway porter living in Hammersmith in London. However, in 1882 he joined the Metropolitan Police, aged 19, and was given the warrant number 66711. He was posted to the Metropolitan Police's X Division (Paddington Green) in June 1882. On 15 November 1886, Dew married Kate Morris in Notting Hill. They had six children, one of whom died in infancy.

== Jack the Ripper ==
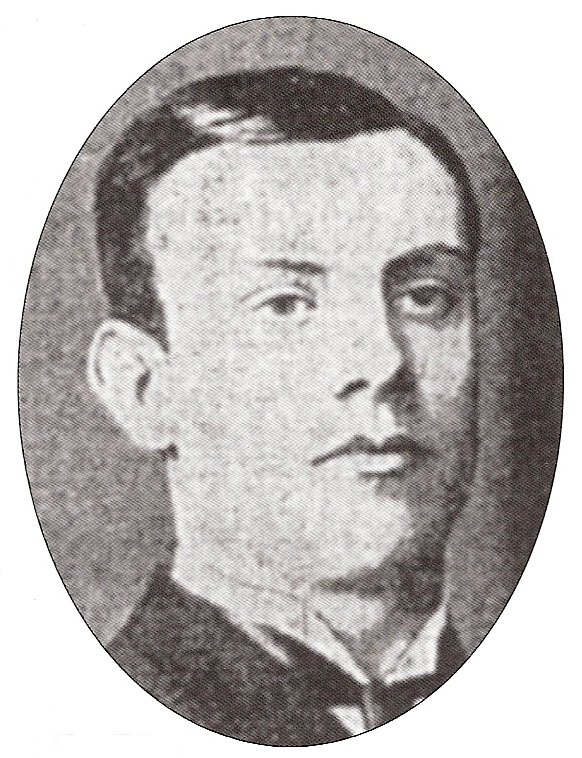
Detective Constable Walter Dew c. 1887

Early in 1887, Dew was transferred to Commercial Street police station in H Division (Whitechapel), where he was a detective constable in the Criminal Investigation Department during the Jack the Ripper murders of 1888.

In his memoirs, published fifty years later in 1938, Dew made a number of claims about being personally involved in the Ripper investigation. Dew claimed to know Mary Jane Kelly by sight. "Often I saw her parading along Commercial Street, between Flower and Dean Street and Aldgate, or along Whitechapel Road", he wrote. "She was usually in the company of two or three of her kind, fairly neatly dressed and invariably wearing a clean white apron, but no hat." Dew also claimed to have been one of the first police officers on the murder scene, though none of the records mentioning those people who were present list his involvement.

Dew wrote that he saw Kelly's mutilated body in her room in Miller's Court and that he regarded it as "the most gruesome memory of the whole of my Police career." Dew wrote that Kelly's open eyes were photographed in an attempt to capture an image of her killer, but police doctors involved in the case had already determined that such an effort would be futile. Dew stated that Emma Smith was the first Ripper victim, a view that has often been contested by Ripperologists, and opined that "Someone, somewhere, shared Jack the Ripper's guilty secret."

== Police career ==
In 1898 Dew was promoted to Inspector, and was transferred to Scotland Yard. He moved to T Division in Hammersmith in 1900, and in 1903 was promoted to Inspector First Class and moved to E Division, based at Bow Street. In 1906, he became a Chief Inspector, and returned to Scotland Yard. By the time of his retirement from the police in 1910 Dew had received 130 recommendations and rewards from the Commissioner of the Metropolitan Police, judges and magistrates.

In 1898, Dew was involved in bringing international jewel-thief William Johnson, known as 'Harry the Valet', to justice. Johnson stole jewellery then valued at £30,000 from Mary Caroline, Dowager Duchess of Sutherland while she was travelling by train from Paris to London with her husband, Sir Albert Rollit MP, and her brother, his wife and the Duchess's footman and maid. Dew investigated the case together with Inspectors Walter Dinnie and Frank Froest. They tracked Johnson, who by now was spending large amounts of money, to lodgings in London's South Kensington. Despite receiving a seven-year prison sentence, Johnson refused to disclose the whereabouts of the Duchess's jewels, and only £4,000 worth were ever recovered.

Dew had a small role in the Druce-Portland case: he supervised the exhumation of the remains of T. C. Druce in 1907 which effectively put an end to the Druce claims.

When Russian fraudster Friedlauski obtained a position as a clerk on the staff of New York bank J.S. Bache & Co. using the name Conrad Harms in 1909, and transferred funds totaling £1,637 14s to his bank account in London (where he subsequently fled), it was Dew who tracked him down. Despite claiming that he was Harms' near identical cousin Henry Clifford, a pretence he maintained even when confronted by the wife he had previously abandoned, Friedlauski/Harms was sentenced to six years penal servitude for fraud and bigamy.

== Arrest of Dr Crippen ==
Doctor Hawley Harvey Crippen was an American, born in Michigan in 1862. He qualified as a doctor in 1885 and worked for a patent medicine company. Coming to England in 1900, he lived at 39 Hilldrop Crescent, Holloway, with his second wife Cora Turner, better known by her stage name of 'Belle Elmore'. After a party at their home on 31 January 1910, Cora disappeared. Hawley Crippen claimed that she had returned to the US, and later added that she had died, and had been cremated, in California. Meanwhile, his lover, Ethel Le Neve (1883–1967), moved into Hilldrop Crescent and began openly wearing Cora's clothes and jewellery. The police were informed of Cora's disappearance by her friend, strongwoman Kate Williams, better known as Vulcana. The house was searched, but nothing was found, and Crippen was interviewed by Dew. After the interview, and a quick search of the house, Dew was satisfied. However, Crippen and Le Neve did not know this and fled in panic to Brussels, where they spent the night at a hotel. The following day, they went to Antwerp and boarded the Canadian Pacific liner SS Montrose for Canada.

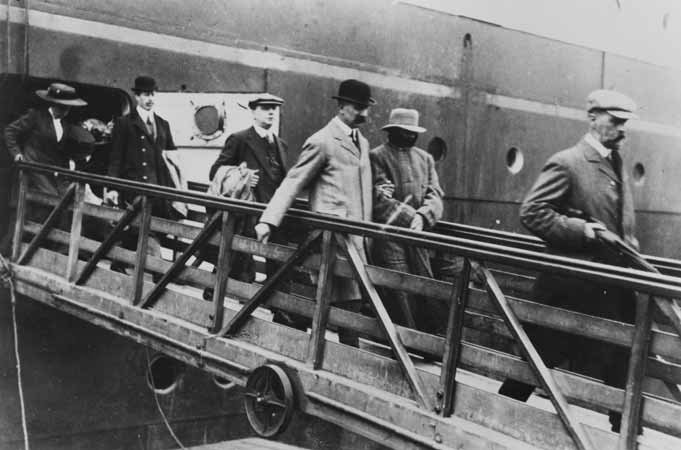
Inspector Dew with a disguised Crippen in handcuffs

Their disappearance led the police at Scotland Yard to perform another three searches of the house. During the fourth and final search, they found the remains of a human body, buried under the brick floor of the basement. Sir Bernard Spilsbury found traces of the calming drug scopolamine. The corpse was identified by a piece of skin from its abdomen; the head, limbs, and skeleton were never recovered. Crippen and Le Neve fled across the Atlantic on the Montrose, with le Neve disguised as a boy. Captain Henry George Kendall recognised the fugitives and, just before steaming out of range of the land-based transmitters, had telegraphist Lawrence Ernest Hughes send a wireless telegram to the British authorities: "Have strong suspicions that Crippen London cellar murderer and accomplice are among saloon passengers. Mustache taken off growing beard. Accomplice dressed as boy. Manner and build undoubtedly a girl." Had Crippen travelled 3rd class, he would have probably escaped Kendall's notice. Dew boarded a faster White Star liner, the SS Laurentic, arrived in Quebec, Canada ahead of Crippen, and contacted the Canadian authorities.

As the Montrose entered the St. Lawrence River, Dew came aboard disguised as a pilot. Kendall invited Crippen to meet the pilots as they came aboard. Dew removed his pilot's cap and said, "Good morning, Dr Crippen. Do you know me? I'm Chief Inspector Dew from Scotland Yard." After a pause, Crippen replied, "Thank God it's over. The suspense has been too great. I couldn't stand it any longer." He then held out his wrists for the handcuffs. Crippen and le Neve were arrested on board the Montrose on 31 July 1910.

In his 1938 memoirs, Dew recalled:

"I had landed on July 29 by the liner Laurentic, arriving two days before the Montrose, which was already well out in the Atlantic when we first suspected that Crippen was aboard, but which was a much slower vessel than the mail steamer Laurentic. Old Crippen took it quite well. He always was a bit of a philosopher, though he could not have helped being astounded to see me on board the boat. He was quite a likeable chap in his way. Much of my time in Canada was spent evading reporters and cameramen, who knew all about my arrival in spite of our efforts to keep it secret, and who frequently became personal when I did not give them a statement. As it happened, Crippen and his companion, Miss Ethel Le Neve, showed no desire to postpone our departure and waived their extradition rights, which enabled us to make the return journey after being only three weeks in Canada."

Dew returned to England with Crippen aboard the SS Megantic, paving the way for a sensational trial at the Old Bailey. Newspapers at the time said he had "effected the most sensational criminal capture of the century".

== Later years ==
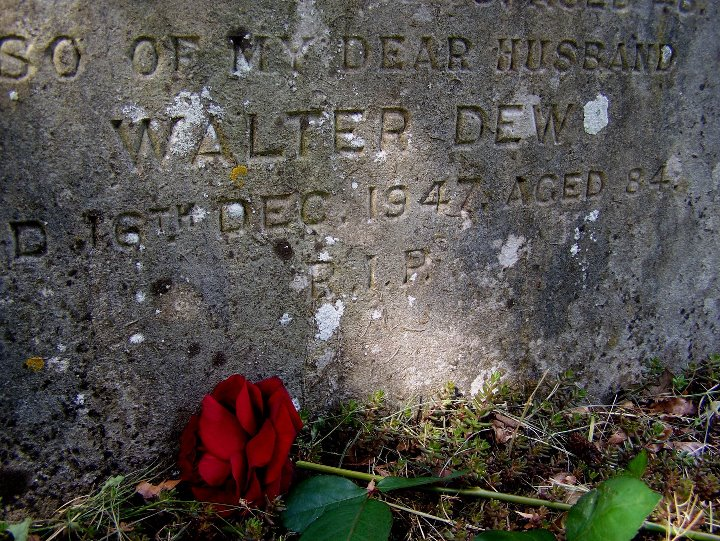
Dew's Gravestone at Durrington Cemetery, Photograph taken in 2011

By now internationally famous, Dew resigned from the police and set up as a "Confidential Agent". In 1911, he brought libel actions against nine newspapers for comments they had printed about him during the Crippen case. Most settled out of court, and Dew won his case against those who did not, resulting in his being awarded substantial sums as damages.

After his retirement, Dew became an unofficial 'criminal expert' for the British press, who would print his comments and opinions on various cases then in the public eye, such as the mysterious disappearance in 1926 of crime-writer Agatha Christie. He published his autobiography 'I Caught Crippen' in 1938. This contained factual errors as many of the events described were being recalled sometimes nearly thirty years later; Dew himself admitted this in the book. However, compared to many of the memoirs written by Dew's contemporaries about the same events, it is "broadly accurate".

Dew retired to Worthing, living at the Wee Hoose, 10 Beaumont Road, until his death in 1947. He was buried at Durrington Cemetery in Worthing, Section 15, Row 5, Grave Space 46.

The bungalow that Dew retired in was renamed 'Dew Cottage' in his honour, in 2005.

== Film portrayals ==
Year	Title	Maker	Dew played by:
1942	Dr. Crippen an Bord	Germany	René Deltgen
1962	Dr. Crippen	UK	John Arnatt.
2011	Finding Walter	Wales	Alun Collins

== Television portrayals ==
Year	Title	Maker	Dew played by:
1956	The Case of Dr. Crippen	ATV	Philip Lennard
1968	Investigating Murder	BBC	Philip Webb
1973	Jack the Ripper	BBC	Norman Shelley
1981	Ladykillers: Miss Elmore	ITV	Alan Downer
1999	Tales from the Black Museum	Discovery Channel	Not credited
2004	The Last Secret of Dr Crippen	Channel 4	David Broughton-Davies
2008	'Revealed' Was Crippen Innocent?	Five	Not credited

== In fiction ==
Dew is the inspiration for the central figure in Peter Lovesey's novel The False Inspector Dew (1982), ISBN 0-333-32748-9, which won the Gold Dagger Award for crime fiction.

Dew also appears in several of M. J. Trow's humorous Inspector Lestrade novels, which depict him as dedicated but somewhat bumbling. Lestrade and the Leviathan (1987) includes a fictionalized version of the Crippen case.

Walter Dew appears as a main character in Blackout Baby, a thriller by French writer Michel Moatti, published in 2014.

== See also ==
- Big Five (Scotland Yard)
