= SS Montrose (1897) =

Ship

Coordinates: 51°16′25″N 1°30′30″E

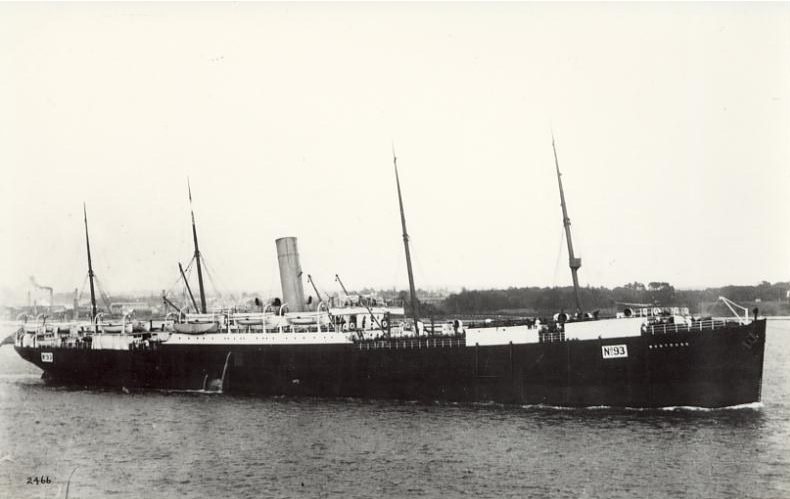
- Montrose whilst in service as a troopship c 1900-1903

History

United Kingdom
- Name: Montrose
- Owner: 1897: African Steamship Co; 1900: Elder, Dempster & Co; 1902: Imperial Direct West Indies Mail Service Co Ltd; 1903: Canadian Pacific Railway; 1914: Admiralty
- Operator: 1897: Elder, Dempster & Co; 1902: Elder, Dempster & Co
- Port of registry: London
- Route: 1897: Avonmouth – Montreal; 1903: Liverpool – Quebec – Montreal; 1904: London – Antwerp – Quebec – Montreal
- Builder: Sir Raylton Dixon & Co, Middlesbrough
- Yard number: 441
- Launched: 17 June 1897
- Completed: September 1897
- Maiden voyage: September 1897, Middlesbrough – Quebec – Montreal
- Refit: 1903
- Identification: UK official number 108251; code letters PTWV; By 1913: w/t call sign: MLJ
- Fate: Wrecked, 28 December 1914

General characteristics
- Type: 1897: Cargo liner; 1903: Ocean liner
- Tonnage: 1897: 5,410 GRT, 3,457 NRT; 1898: 5,431 GRT, 3,457 NRT; 1901: 7,094 GRT, 5,349 NRT; 1905: 6,278 GRT, 3,968 NRT; 1911: 7,207 GRT, 5,402 NRT
- Length: 444.3 ft (135.4 m)
- Beam: 52.0 ft (15.8 m)
- Depth: 27.5 ft (8.4 m)
- Decks: 2
- Installed power: 632 NHP
- Propulsion: 1 × Triple expansion engine; 1 × Screw propeller
- Speed: 12 knots (22 km/h)
- Capacity: 1897: 12 1st Class passengers; 1903: 70 2nd Class, 1,800 3rd Class; Refrigerated cargo: 25,063 cubic feet (710 m^{3})
- Sensors & processing systems: By 1911: Submarine signalling
- Notes: Sister ships: Montcalm, Monteagle, Montfort

SS Montrose was a British merchant steamship that was built in 1897 and wrecked in 1914. She was built as a cargo liner for Elder, Dempster & Company. In 1903 the Canadian Pacific Railway bought her and had her converted into a passenger liner.

Montrose is notable for being the ship on which Hawley Harvey Crippen and his lover Ethel Le Neve fled Britain after Crippen murdered his wife in 1910. Montrose was wrecked in the early months of the First World War after she broke her moorings.

== Building ==
In 1897 the African Steamship Company, part of Elder, Dempster and Company, had a pair of steamships built. Palmers Shipbuilding and Iron Company in Jarrow built Montcalm, launching her on 17 May 1897 and completing her that August. Sir Raylton Dixon and Company in Middlesbrough built her sister ship Montrose, launching her on 17 June 1897 and completing her that September.

The dimensions of the two ships were almost identical. Montrose's registered length was 444.3 ft (135.4 m), her beam was 52.0 ft (15.8 m) and her depth was 27.5 ft (8.4 m). As built, her tonnages were 5,431 GRT and 3,457 NRT. 25,063 cubic feet (710 m^{3}) of her cargo space was refrigerated. She was primarily a cargo ship, but she had berths for 12 passengers.

Montrose was a coal-burner. She had a single screw, driven by a three-cylinder triple expansion engine built by T Richardson and Sons of Hartlepool. It was rated at 632 NHP and gave her a speed of 12 knots (22 km/h).

The African Steamship Co registered Montrose in London. Her UK official number was 108251 and her code letters were PTWV.

Elder, Dempster & Co ordered a second pair of ships from Palmers, built to the same design. Monteagle was launched on 13 December 1898 and completed in March 1899. Montfort was launched on 13 February 1899 and completed that April.

== Elder, Dempster career ==
In September 1897 Montrose began her maiden voyage from Middlesbrough to Quebec and Montreal. On 29 October she began a regular service between Avonmouth and Montreal. In 1900 her ownership was transferred to the African Steamship Co's parent company, Elder Dempster. On 14 March that year Montrose began the first of eight voyages from Liverpool to Cape Town as a troop ship for the Second Boer War.

In 1901 Montrose's tonnages were revised to 7,094 GRT and 5,349 NRT. That year Elder, Dempster formed a new subsidiary, the Imperial Direct West India Mail Service Company, to run services to the Caribbean. By 1902 Elder, Dempster had transferred Montrose to this new subsidiary.

== Canadian Pacific career ==
In 1903 the Canadian Pacific Railway bought Elder, Dempster's shipping service to and from Canada, with 14 ships including Montrose and her three sisters. Canadian Pacific had Montrose refitted with berths for 70 Second Class and 1,800 Third Class passengers.

Canadian Pacific changed Montrose's route a number of times. On 20 April 1903 she left Liverpool for Quebec and Montreal. On 7 April 1904 she left London for Antwerp, Southampton and Saint John, New Brunswick. On 28 May 1904 she left London for Antwerp, Quebec and Montreal.

In 1905 Montrose's tonnages were revised to 6,278 GRT and 3,968 NRT. By 1911 they had been revised again to 7,207 GRT and 5,402 NRT.

By 1910 Montrose was equipped for wireless telegraphy, which the Marconi Company supplied and operated under contract. By 1911 she was equipped for submarine signalling. By 1913 her wireless call sign was MLJ.

=== Arrest of Crippen and Le Neve ===
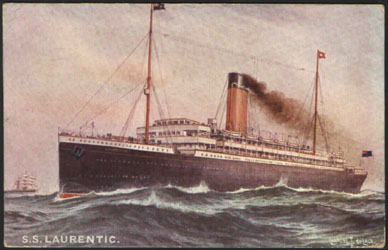
The liner Laurentic, on which Chief Inspector Walter Dew overtook Montrose to arrest Crippen

In 1910 the US homeopath Hawley Harvey Crippen and his lover, Ethel Le Neve, fled England shortly after the suspicious disappearance of his wife. After a body was found in the basement of their London home, Scotland Yard Chief Inspector Walter Dew sought Crippen and Le Neve on suspicion of murder.

Travelling in disguise and under false names, the couple had left Antwerp aboard Montrose on 20 July. Montrose's wireless telegraph equipment had a normal range of only 150 nautical miles (270 km). A wireless signal about Crippen and Le Neve reached Montrose while she was still just within range to reply. Her master, Captain H G Kendall, who commanded the Empress of Ireland on her final voyage in 1914, identified the disguised Crippen and Le Neve, and got his wireless operator to reply to this effect. Dew sailed west on the White Star liner Laurentic, which was quicker and overtook Montrose. When Montrose reached Quebec, Dew arrested the couple and brought them back to England to stand trial.

== First World War ==
In August 1914 Montrose and another Canadian Pacific ship, Montreal, were in Antwerp as the German army was advancing into Belgium. Montreal's engine was under repair, and Montrose had been waiting to bunker. Captain Kendall, who was now working at Antwerp as Canadian Pacific's marine superintendent, arranged for Montreal to bunker Montrose. He filled both ships with Belgian refugees, and Montrose towed Montreal to England.

=== Loss ===
On 28 October 1914 the Admiralty requisitioned Montrose to use as a reserve blockship at Dover. On either 20 or 28 December she broke her moorings in a gale, and drifted onto the Goodwin Sands, where she was wrecked.

== Bibliography ==
- Croall, James (1981). Disaster at Sea: The Last Voyage of the Empress of Ireland. New York: Day Books. ISBN 978-0812870435.
- Lloyd's Register of British and Foreign Shipping. Vol. I–Steamers. London: Lloyd's Register of Shipping. 1898. MON – via Internet Archive.
- Lloyd's Register of British and Foreign Shipping. Vol. I–Steamers. London: Lloyd's Register of Shipping. 1900. MON – via Internet Archive.
- Lloyd's Register of British and Foreign Shipping. Vol. I–Steamers. London: Lloyd's Register of Shipping. 1901. MON–MOR – via Internet Archive.
- Lloyd's Register of British and Foreign Shipping. Vol. I–Steamers. London: Lloyd's Register of Shipping. 1903. MON–MOO – via Internet Archive.
- Lloyd's Register of British and Foreign Shipping. Vol. I–Steamers. London: Lloyd's Register of Shipping. 1904. MON–MOO – via Internet Archive.
- Lloyd's Register of British and Foreign Shipping. Vol. I–Steamers. London: Lloyd's Register of Shipping. 1905. MON–MOO – via Internet Archive.
- Lloyd's Register of British and Foreign Shipping. Vol. I–Steamers. London: Lloyd's Register of Shipping. 1911. MON–MOO – via Internet Archive.
- Lloyd's Register of Shipping. Vol. I–Steamers, Sailing Vessels, and Owners. London: Lloyd's Register of Shipping. 1914.
- The Marconi Press Agency Ltd (1913). The Year Book of Wireless Telegraphy and Telephony. London: The St Katherine Press.
