= Moatti =

Moatti is surname. Notable people with the surname include:

- Claudia Moatti (born 1954), French historian
- Emilie Moatti (born 1980), Israeli filmmaker, writer, and politician
- Michel Moatti (born 1958), French journalist and novelist
