= SS Polar Chief =

British merchant steamship

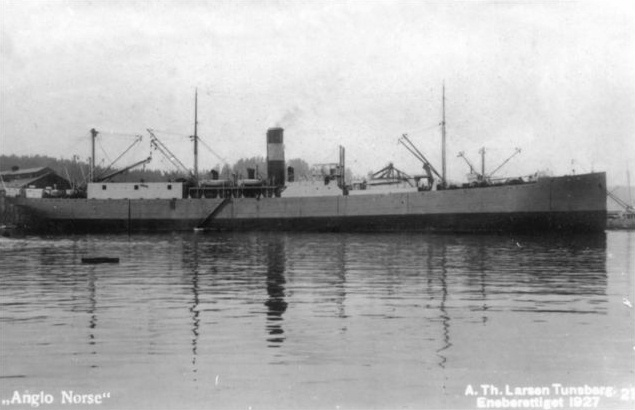
- The ship as Anglo-Norse in 1927

History
- Name: 1897: Montcalm; 1914: "HMS Audacious"; 1916: RFA Crenella; 1918: Crenella; 1923: Rey Alfonso; 1927: Anglo-Norse; 1929: Polar Chief; 1941: Empire Chief; 1946: Polar Chief
- Namesake: 1897: Marquis de Montcalm; 1916: the genus Crenella
- Owner: 1897: African SS Co; 1903: Elder, Dempster; 1903: Canadian Pacific Rly; 1916: Admiralty; 1917: Shipping Controller; 1919: Anglo-Saxon Petroleum; 1920: Velefa Shipping Co; 1924: LA Millis; 1924: Christian Nielsen & Co; 1925: HM Wrangell & Co; 1927: Anglo Norse Co; 1929: Falkland Whaling Co; 1941: Ministry of War Transport; 1946: Falkland Whaling Co
- Operator: 1896: Elder, Dempster; 1898: Atlantic Transport Line; 1900: Elder, Dempster; 1903: Canadian Pacific; 1914: (United Kingdom of Great Britain and Ireland) Royal Navy; 1916: Frederick Leyland; 1916: (United Kingdom of Great Britain and Ireland) Lane & MacAndrews or Anglo-Saxon Petroleum for the Royal Fleet Auxiliary; 1918: Anglo-Saxon Petroleum; 1920: Runciman & Co; 1923: Christian Nielsen & Co; 1927: HM Wrangell & Co; 1929: Hans Borge; 1929: Falkland Whaling Co; 1941: Christian Salvesen & Co Ltd; 1946: Falkland Whaling Company
- Port of registry: 1897: (United Kingdom of Great Britain and Ireland) Liverpool; 1916: (United Kingdom of Great Britain and Ireland) London; 1923: (Norway) Larvik; 1925: (Norway) Haugesund; 1927: (Norway) Tønsberg; 1929: (United Kingdom) Jersey; 1946: (United Kingdom) Leith
- Route: 1898–1900: London – New York; 1900–02: New Orleans – Cape Town; 1903–14: Avonmouth – Montreal
- Builder: Palmers Shipbuilding & Iron Co, Jarrow
- Yard number: 724
- Launched: 17 May 1897
- Completed: August 1897
- Commissioned: August 1914
- Decommissioned: 1923
- Maiden voyage: 3 September 1897
- Out of service: 1920–23, 1930, 1939
- Refit: 1916, 1929
- Identification: UK Official number 106869; 1897–1916: Code letters PTDS; by 1913: w/t Call sign MLZ; Pennant numbers X04, X71, YZ.143; 1917–23: Code letters JNLQ; 1923–29: Code letters LDJN; 1930–52: Call sign GFMT
- Fate: Scrapped

General characteristics
- Type: 1897: Cargo liner; 1914: Troop ship; 1914–15: Dummy battleship; 1915–16: Store ship; 1916–23: Oil tanker; 1923–27: Whale oil tanker; 1927–52: Factory ship & whale oil tanker
- Tonnage: 1897: 5,466 GRT, 3,575 NRT; 1900: 6,981 GRT, 5,284 NRT; 1901: 5,505 GRT, 3,508 NRT; 1916: 7,035 GRT, 5,371 NRT; 1922: 5,772 GRT, 3,608 NRT; 1929: 7,172 GRT, 4,348 NRT; 1939: 8,040 GRT, 6,279 NRT
- Length: 445.0 ft (135.6 m)
- Beam: 52.5 ft (16.0 m)
- Depth: 27.6 ft (8.4 m)
- Decks: 2
- Installed power: 664 NHP
- Propulsion: 1 × Triple expansion engine; 1 × Propeller
- Speed: 12.5 knots (23 km/h)
- Capacity: 1897: 12 2nd Class passengers; Refrigerated cargo: 15,340 cubic feet (434 m^{3})
- Sensors & processing systems: by 1911: submarine signalling; by 1931: Wireless direction finding; by 1948: Echo sounding device, radar
- Notes: Sister ships: Montrose, Monteagle, Montfort

SS Polar Chief was a merchant steamship that was built in England in 1897 and scrapped in Scotland in 1952. In her 55-year career she had previously been called Montcalm, RFA Crenella, Crenella, Rey Alfonso, Anglo-Norse and Empire Chief. Early in the First World War she spent eight months pretending to be the battleship HMS Audacious.

The ship was built in Newcastle upon Tyne as the cargo liner Montcalm. In the First World War she was a troop ship, a dummy battleship and a depot ship, and then in 1916 was converted into the oil tanker Crenella. She spent about 20 months in the Royal Fleet Auxiliary, survived being hit by a torpedo in 1917, and returned to civilian service in 1919.

In 1923 she was sold to Norwegian buyers who renamed her Rey Alfonso and had her converted to carry whale oil. In 1927 she was sold back to UK owners who renamed her Anglo-Norse and had her equipped as a whaling factory ship. In 1929 new owners bought her and renamed her Polar Chief. She was laid up in Norway in September 1939, but returned to Britain that December.

In the Second World War the ship carried heavy fuel oil and other cargoes as well as whale products. In 1941 the Ministry of War Transport acquired her and renamed her Empire Chief. In 1942 she ran aground, but was refloated and repaired. In 1946 she was returned to commercial ownership and her name was returned to Polar Chief. In 1952 she was scrapped by two shipbreakers in the west of Scotland.

== Building ==
Montcalm was the first of a set of four sister ships built for the African Steamship Company. Palmers Shipbuilding and Iron Company in Jarrow built her, launching her on 17 May 1897 and completing her that August. Sir Raylton Dixon and Company in Middlesbrough built her sister ship Montrose, launching her on 17 June 1897 and completing her that September.

The dimensions of the two ships were almost identical. Montcalm's registered length was 445.0 ft (135.6 m), her beam was 52.5 ft (16.0 m) and her depth was 27.6 ft (8.4 m). As built, her tonnages were 5,466 GRT and 3,575 NRT. 15,340 cubic feet (434 m^{3}) of her cargo space was refrigerated. She was primarily a cargo ship, but she had berths for 12 Second Class passengers.

Three double ended boilers supplied steam at 180 pounds per square inch (12 bar) to her three-cylinder triple expansion engine, which drove her single screw. Her engine was rated at 664 NHP and gave her a speed of 12.5 knots (23 km/h).

In 1897 Elder, Dempster registered Montcalm in Liverpool. Her UK official number was 106869 and her code letters were PTDS.

Elder, Dempster & Co ordered a second pair of ships from Palmers, built to the same design. Monteagle was launched on 13 December 1898 and completed in March 1899. Montfort was launched on 13 February 1899 and completed that April.

== Career ==
=== Montcalm ===
==== Peacetime ====
At the start of her career, Montcalm was managed by the African Steamship Company's parent company Elder, Dempster & Co. On 3 September 1897 she started her maiden voyage from Avonmouth to Montreal. On 13 November 1898 she was chartered to the Atlantic Transport Line. Between then and January 1900 Montcalm made eleven trans-Atlantic voyages between New York and either London or Gravesend.

On 5 April 1900 she sailed from Liverpool for Cape Town as a transport ship for the Second Boer War. Montcalm then made six return voyages between Cape Town and New Orleans, carrying horses or mules. In September 1900 The Daily Telegraph reported that she sustained a mutiny. Her English stokers had refused to work with several Danes who had been signed on to the ship, and US muleteers caring for her cargo of 1,400 mules objected to the quality of food aboard.

In 1900 Montcalm's tonnages were increased to 6,981 GRT and 5,284 NRT. However, in 1901 this was reversed and she was assessed at 5,505 GRT and 3,508 NRT.

In June 1902 Montcalm started the first of four round trips between Avonmouth and Montreal. On 10 December that year she left Avonmouth for Saint John, New Brunswick. In 1903 she passed to Elder Dempster Lines when that company absorbed the African Steamship Company.

On 6 April 1903 the Canadian Pacific Railway bought Elder, Dempster's shipping service to and from Canada, with 14 ships including Montcalm and her three sisters. On 21 May 1903 she sailed from Swansea. Her usual route with Canadian Pacific was between Avonmouth and Montreal or Saint John, New Brunswick. She occasionally visited Bristol, Liverpool or Quebec, and on 11 March 1913 she called at Greenock. (Note: One source claims that in 1903 Canadian Pacific had Montcalm converted to carry 70 Second Class and 1,800 Third Class passengers. Other sources do not corroborate this, and there is a lack of evidence of her carrying large numbers of passengers. Her sister ship Montrose was converted to carry exactly this number of passengers. The source may have inadvertently confused the two ships.)

By 1911 Montcalm was equipped for wireless telegraphy and submarine signalling. The Marconi Company supplied and operated her wireless equipment under contract. By 1913 her wireless call sign was MLZ.

=== Montcalm ===
==== World War I ====
In August 1914 the Admiralty requisitioned Montcalm. She was initially used as a troop ship carrying members of the British Expeditionary Force. In October 1914 she was converted to a dummy battleship, mimicking HMS Audacious, whose name she carried. She was a member of a dummy battleship squadron, which was disbanded on 6 July 1915.

In 1915 the Admiralty intended to use her as a blockship, but instead she was used as either a depot ship or a store ship. On 19 January 1916 she was transferred to the Shipping Controller, who appointed Frederick Leyland Ltd of Liverpool to manage her.

=== RFA Crenella ===
On 29 January the Admiralty bought Montcalm. In August 1916 she arrived in Liverpool for conversion into an oil tanker, which was completed on 26 October 1916. Her tonnages were increased to 7,035 GRT and 5,371 NRT.

In 1916 the ship was renamed Crenella, registered in London, and her code letters were changed to JNLQ. The Admiralty placed her under the management of either Lane and MacAndrews or the Anglo-Saxon Petroleum Company. Anglo Saxon Petroleum was a subsidiary of Royal Dutch Shell, which named all of its ships after genera of molluscs. Crenella is a genus of mussels. On 18 November 1916 the ship entered service with the Royal Fleet Auxiliary as RFA Crenella. On 11 October 1917 her ownership was transferred to the Shipping Controller.

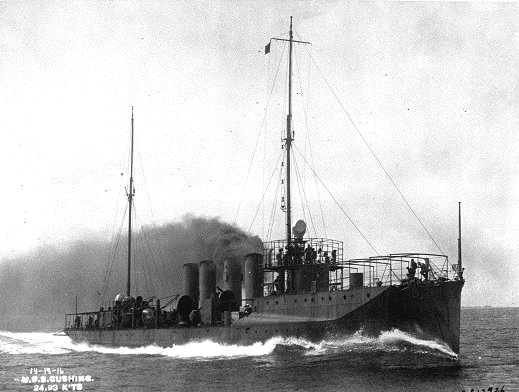
After Crenella was torpedoed, the destroyer USS Cushing assisted and escorted her.

On 26 November 1917 Crenella was sailing in ballast from Queenstown to Montreal when U-101 torpedoed her 146 nautical miles (270 km) west of Queenstown, at 49°47′N 10°58′W. Crenella was damaged but remained afloat. The US Navy destroyer USS Cushing gave damage control assistance and escorted Crenella back to Queenstown. On 1 August 1918 a submarine fired a torpedo at Montcalm, but missed.

On 26 November 1919 Anglo Saxon Petroleum bought Crenella. On 19 October 1920 the Velefa Shipping Co Ltd of London bought her and placed under the management of Runciman & Co Ltd, but she was then laid up. In 1922 her tonnages were reduced to 5,772 GRT and 3,608 NRT.

=== Rey Alfonso ===
On 20 June 1923 A/S Larvik Hvalfaugerselsk bought Crenella for £24,000, renamed her Rey Alfonso and registered her in Larvik in Norway. Her code letters were changed to LDJN. She was refitted as a whale oil depot ship and placed under the management of Christian Nielsen & Co. In 1925 HM Wrangell & Co A/S bought her and registered her in Haugesund. In Her tonnages were revised to 5,938 GRT and 3,480 NRT.

=== Anglo-Norse ===
In 1927 the Anglo-Norse Company bought Rey Alfonso, renamed her Anglo-Norse and registered her in Tønsberg. She was fitted out with four 50-ton derricks to lift whales aboard for flensing. Hans Borge was appointed to manage her. He sent her to work in the South Sandwich Islands in the South Atlantic.

=== Polar Chief (1929) ===
In August 1929 the Falkland Whaling Company bought Anglo-Norse, renamed her Polar Chief and registered her in Jersey. Her tonnages were increased to 7,172 GRT and 4,348 NRT. By 1930 her wireless call sign was GFMT. (Note: From 1930 until 1933 the Mercantile Navy List records Polar Chief's wireless call sign as GFMT. However, Lloyd's Register of Shipping records it as QFMT from 1934 to 1937, and GFMT from 1938 onward. The international convention at the time was for all UK-registered merchant ships to have a four-letter call sign beginning with the letter "G". Therefore records citing "QFMT" may be an error.) She was laid up for the 1930 whaling season but then returned to service. By 1931 her navigation equipment included wireless direction finding. In 1939 her tonnages were increased to 8,040 GRT and 6,279 NRT.

In September 1939 Polar Chief was laid up at Tønsberg, but that December she left Norway in Convoy HN 5 to the Clyde. In the early part of the Second World War she continued whaling, visiting South Georgia in March 1940. In an attempt to reduce exposure to U-boats and German surface raiders, she sailed via the Western Atlantic. On her outward voyage she called at Curaçao. On her return voyage she called at Aruba, and then Halifax, Nova Scotia, where she joined Convoy HX 35 to reach The Downs off the coast of Kent. Her cargo on her return voyage was furnace fuel oil.

On 2 July 1941 the Ministry of War Transport acquired Polar Chief and appointed Christian Salvesen & Co Ltd to manage her. She sailed independently to New York, and returned via Halifax where she joined Convoy HX 141 to Belfast Lough. In October 1941 she sailed to New York again, returning via Halifax to join Convoy HX 156.

=== Empire Chief ===
On 17 November 1941 Polar Chief was renamed Empire Chief. On 16 January 1942 she ran aground at Reykjavík, Iceland. She was refloated on 7 March and temporarily repaired. She was towed back to Britain, leaving Reykjavík in 8 July and reaching the River Tyne on 15 July where she was permanently repaired.

In March 1943 Empire Chief left New York carrying fuel oil. She sailed with Convoy HX 231 to Belfast Lough. The Admiralty considered having her converted into a fleet oiler, but in April 1943 decided she was not stable enough at sea for this.

In August 1943 Empire Chief sailed with Convoy HX 251 from New York to Belfast Lough. Her cargo was fuel oil, plus a deck cargo of armoured fighting vehicles. In November 1943 she sailed with Convoy HX 266 from New York to the Clyde. Her cargo was fuel oil, plus spare depth charges.

From January until September 1944 Empire Chief operated in the Caribbean and along the East Coast of the United States. She called frequently at Guantanamo Bay and at New York, and occasionally at Aruba, Curaçao, Houston, Charleston and Portland, Maine.

In May 1945 Empire Chief sailed with Convoy HX 354 from New York to Liverpool. Her cargo was fuel oil and acids. In October 1945 she sailed unescorted from Curaçao to Swansea and then Barry.

=== Polar Chief (1946) ===
On 3 August 1946 the South Georgia Company bought Empire Chief, restored her name to Polar Chief, and registered her in Leith. Christian Salvesen remained her managers. In August 1947 she berthed in Avonmouth carrying whale bone meal, whale oil, sperm oil and salted whale livers from South Georgia, but also furnace fuel oil from Aruba. By 1948 her navigation equipment included an echo sounding device and radar. Her tonnages were increased to 8,091 GRT and 6,334 NRT.

On 29 April 1952 Polar Chief arrived at Dalmuir in Dunbartonshire for WH Arnott Young Ltd to start breaking her up. On 22 June her partly-dismantled hulk was towed to Troon in Ayrshire, where the West of Scotland Shipbreaking Co Ltd continued her demolition. Her hulk was beached on 27 August 1952, and demolition was completed on 12 January 1953.

== Bibliography ==
- Lloyd's Register of British and Foreign Shipping. Vol. I–Steamers. London: Lloyd's Register of Shipping. 1897. Supplement, M – via Internet Archive.
- Lloyd's Register of British and Foreign Shipping. Vol. I–Steamers. London: Lloyd's Register of Shipping. 1898. MON – via Internet Archive.
- Lloyd's Register of British and Foreign Shipping. Vol. I–Steamers. London: Lloyd's Register of Shipping. 1899. MON – via Internet Archive.
- Lloyd's Register of British and Foreign Shipping. Vol. I–Steamers. London: Lloyd's Register of Shipping. 1900. MON – via Internet Archive.
- Lloyd's Register of British and Foreign Shipping. Vol. I–Steamers. London: Lloyd's Register of Shipping. 1901. MON – via Internet Archive.
- Lloyd's Register of British and Foreign Shipping. Vol. I–Steamers. London: Lloyd's Register of Shipping. 1904. MON – via Internet Archive.
- Lloyd's Register of British and Foreign Shipping. Vol. I–Steamers. London: Lloyd's Register of Shipping. 1911. MON – via Internet Archive.
- Lloyd's Register of Shipping. Vol. I–Steamers, Sailing Vessels, and Owners. London: Lloyd's Register of Shipping. 1914.
- Lloyd's Register of Shipping. Vol. I–Steamers. London: Lloyd's Register of Shipping. 1915. MON – via Internet Archive.
- Lloyd's Register of Shipping. Vol. I–Steamers. London: Lloyd's Register of Shipping. 1918. CRA–CRE – via Internet Archive.
- Lloyd's Register of Shipping. Vol. I–Steamers. London: Lloyd's Register of Shipping. 1922. CRE – via Internet Archive.
- Lloyd's Register of Shipping. Vol. II–Steamers and Motor Vessels. London: Lloyd's Register of Shipping. 1923. CRA–CRE – via Internet Archive.
- Lloyd's Register of Shipping. Vol. II–Steamers and Motor Vessels. London: Lloyd's Register of Shipping. 1924. Supplement, R – via Internet Archive.
- Lloyd's Register of Shipping. Vol. II–Steamers and Motorships. London: Lloyd's Register of Shipping. 1925. REX–RHI – via Internet Archive.
- Lloyd's Register of Shipping. Vol. II–Steamers and Motorships. London: Lloyd's Register of Shipping. 1928. Supplement, A – via Internet Archive.
- Lloyd's Register of Shipping. Vol. II–Steamers and Motorships. London: Lloyd's Register of Shipping. 1929. ANG – via Internet Archive.
- Lloyd's Register of Shipping (PDF). Vol. II–Steamers & Motorships. Lloyd's Register of Shipping. 1931. POL – via Southampton City Council.
- Lloyd's Register of Shipping. Vol. II–Steamers and Motorships. London: Lloyd's Register of Shipping. 1933. POI–POL – via Internet Archive.
- Lloyd's Register of Shipping (PDF). Vol. II–Steamers & Motorships. Lloyd's Register of Shipping. 1935. POI–POL – via Southampton City Council.
- Lloyd's Register of Shipping (PDF). Vol. II–Steamers & Motorships. Lloyd's Register of Shipping. 1937. POK–POL – via Southampton City Council.
- Lloyd's Register of Shipping. Vol. II–Steamers and Motorships. London: Lloyd's Register of Shipping. 1938. POI–POL – via Internet Archive.
- Lloyd's Register of Shipping (PDF). Vol. II–Steamers & Motorships. Lloyd's Register of Shipping. 1940. POI–POL – via Southampton City Council.
- Lloyd's Register of Shipping (PDF). Vol. II–Steamers & Motorships. Lloyd's Register of Shipping. 1942. Supplement, E – via Southampton City Council.
- "Steamers and Motorships". Lloyd's Register of Shipping. London: Lloyd's Register of Shipping. 1947. EMPIRE CHI – via Internet Archive.
- "Steamers and Motorships". Lloyd's Register of Shipping. London: Lloyd's Register of Shipping. 1948. PO–POL – via Internet Archive.
- Register Book. Vol. M–Z. London: Lloyd's Register of Shipping. 1952. POL – via Internet Archive.
- Register Book. Vol. M–Z. London: Lloyd's Register of Shipping. 1953. POL – via Internet Archive.
- The Marconi Press Agency Ltd (1913). The Year Book of Wireless Telegraphy and Telephony. London: The St Katherine Press.
- Mercantile Navy List. 1898. p. 241 – via Crew List Index Project.
- Mercantile Navy List. 1917. p. 137 – via Crew List Index Project.
- Mercantile Navy List. 1930. p. 428 – via Crew List Index Project.
- Mercantile Navy List. 1933. p. 430 – via Crew List Index Project.
- Mercantile Navy List. 1940. p. 303 – via Crew List Index Project.
- Mercantile Navy List. 1947. p. 100 – via Crew List Index Project.
- Mitchell, WH; Sawyer, LA (1995). The Empire Ships. London, New York, Hamburg, Hong Kong: Lloyd's of London Press Ltd. ISBN 1-85044-275-4.
