= Crenella =

Crenella may refer to

- Crenella (bivalve), a genus of mollusc in the family Mytilidae
- RFA Crenella, a Royal Fleet Auxiliary tanker in service 1916–19
- SS Crenella, the above ship sold into merchant service, in service 1919-23
