= George Dilnot =

British crime writer (1883–1951)

George Dilnot (14 November 1883 – 23 February 1951) was an English writer and novelist, specialising in crime novels and non-fiction criminology.

== Life ==
Born in North Hayling and moving with his family to East Battersea by 1901, he at first became a police officer then a journalist. His first two novels, The Crime Club (1915) and The Rogues’ Syndicate (1916), were both in collaboration with Frank Froest, a retired Metropolitan Police detective.

He then published solely under his own name nearly twenty titles with recurring characters - Inspector Strickland, Val Emery, Horace Augustus Elver, and Jim Strang. At the insistence of several British popular writers, he edited some adventures in the Sexton Blake series. His last novel, Counter-Spy (1942), was an anti-Nazi spy novel.

From 1926 he also wrote works on criminology, the history of the Metropolitan Police and British police investigative methods. For some years he also edited the Famous Trials series, writing two of them himself. He had moved from Balham to Teddington by 1921 and died in East Molesey.

== Works ==
=== Novels ===
- The Secret Service Man (1916)
- Suspected or The Hat-Pin Murder (1920)
- The Lazy Detective (1926)
- The Crooks’ Game (1927)
- The Thousandth Case (1932)
- The Real Detective (1933)
- Sister Satan (1933)
- Crook’s Castle (1934)
- Rogues’ March (1934)
- The Inside Track (1935)
- Murder Masquerade (1935)
- The Great Mail Racket (1936)
- Murder at Scotland Yard (1937)
- Fighting Fool (1939)
- Tiger Lily (1939)
- Counter-Spy (1942)

=== Sexton Blake ===
- The Black Ace (1929)
- The Crime Reporter's Secret (1937)
- The Case of the Missing Bridgeroom (1938)

=== Non-fiction ===
- The Story of Scotland Yard (1926)
- Great Detectives and Their Methods (1928)
- The Trial of the Detectives (1928)
- Scotland Yard : Its History and Organisation 1829-1929 (1929)
- The Trial of Professor Webster (1931)
- Getting Rich Quick (1935)
- Man Hunters: Great Detectives and Their Achievements (1937)
- New Scotland Yard (1938)
