= The False Inspector Dew =

1982 novel by Peter Lovesey

- First UK edition
- Author: Peter Lovesey
- Language: English
- Genre: crime novel
- Publisher: Macmillan
- Publication date: 11 March 1982
- Publication place: United Kingdom
- Media type: Print (Hardcover)
- Pages: 256 p.
- ISBN: 0-333-32748-9
- OCLC: 10173771

The False Inspector Dew is a 1982 humorous crime novel by Peter Lovesey and his ninth book. It won the Gold Dagger award by the Crime Writers' Association in 1982 and has featured on many "Best of" lists since.

== Plot ==
Set in the 1920s, The False Inspector Dew tells the story of dentist Walter Baranov and his romantic interest Alma Webster, who plot to murder his wife while aboard the ocean liner Mauretania. Learning from mistakes made by real-life murderer Dr Crippen, they plan to push Mrs Baranov overboard and have Alma take her place.

The dentist takes on the identity of Inspector Walter Dew, Crippen's nemesis, but when a murder occurs aboard the ship, the captain invites "Inspector Dew" to investigate.

== Literary significance and reception ==
The novel is highly praised by many crime fiction critics and writers. When the book was first published, Library Journal commended the "delightfully comic story with countless twists and turns of plot". A review in The Christian Science Monitor praised the way the author "jumps from scene to scene" with a large number of characters, "[pushing] the action forward at an entertaining clip toward a very clever surprise ending".

Julian Symons in his book Bloody Murder referred to it as “one of the cleverest crime comedies of the past few years.” Famous crime writer Ruth Rendell said in a review: “A masterpiece. I defy anyone to foresee the outcome.”

== Awards ==
- CWA Gold Dagger Award, 1982
- Listed in Crime & Mystery: the 100 Best Books
- Listed in Hatchards 100 Top Crime Novels
- Listed in The Times 100 Best Crime Novels of the Twentieth Century
- Dagger of Daggers shortlist, 2006

== Publication history ==
- 1982, UK, London, Macmillan, ISBN 0-333-32748-9, Hardback
- 1982, USA, Pantheon, ISBN 0-394-52294-X, Hardback
- 1983, UK, Arrow Books, ISBN 0-333-32748-9, Paperback
- 1983, USA, Pantheon, ISBN 0-394-71338-9, Paperback
