= Blackout Baby =

French crime novel

Blackout Baby is a French-language crime novel by Michel Moatti, published in 2014 Éditions Hervé Chopin.

It is the second book to feature the character Mrs Amelia Pritlowe, a nurse at the London Hospital in Whitechapel, functioning as a standalone sequel to Back to Whitechapel by the same author and having no reference to that novel’s plot. Inspired by the real-life Gordon Cummins case, its plot centres on a serial killer haunting the streets of 1942 Blitzed London and taking advantage of the blackout.

It was nominated for the Prix des Lecteurs 2015 at the Festival Polar de Cognac.

== External links (in French) ==
- Jérôme Diesnis (6 November 2014). "Londres, par son côté noir". 20 minutes.
- FRANÇOIS BARRÈRE (3 October 2014). "Polar : Michel Moati, éventreur en série". Midi Libre.
- "Blackout Baby". k-libre.fr.
- "Blackout Baby - Michel Moatti" (livre). Babelio.
- "Librairie Sauramps, Montpellier". sauramps.com.
- "Direct Montpellier Plus - Direct Montpellier Plus". Direct Montpellier Plus.
- "Auteurs / La Comédie du livre". comediedulivre.fr.
- "BIEF - Titre - Blackout baby : Londres, 1942". bief.org.
- "Michel MOATTI - FIRN Frontignan". FIRN Frontignan. 18 June 2015.
