= Augustus Joseph Pepper =

British surgeon and forensic pathologist (1849-1935)

Dr Augustus Joseph Pepper (7 November 1849 - 18 December 1935) was a British surgeon and forensic pathologist.

He was called to give evidence at the Harley Street Mystery inquest (1880), the murder trials of Samuel Herbert Dougal (1903) and Hawley Harvey Crippen (1910), and the investigations into the killing of Teddy Haskell (1908) and the Druce case (1897 and 1903-1907). His testimony also helped save the hairdressing manager at Harrod's from a murder charge for the death of a customer from carbon tetrachloride in a shampoo (1909).

== Life ==
Born in Barrowden, he was a butcher's second son and went to University College London on a scholarship. There and at the University of London he gained several medals, scholarships and exhibitions, along with serving as an assistant in obstetrics, surgical registrar and house physician (all at University College Hospital) and teaching anatomy at UCL's medical school.

From 1880 until his death he held various posts at St Mary's Hospital. In 1883 he wrote the book Elements of surgical pathology, which had its fourth edition published in 1894. He died on Foots Cray Lane in Sidcup, Kent.

== Articles ==
- 'Perforating ulcer of the foot in a patient affected with remarkable degenerative changes in the spinal cord and nerves', with Arthur Quarry Silcock. Transactions of the Pathological Society of London 1884 85, 36, 63.
- 'Lectures on practical legal medicine.' The Lancet, 1887, 2, 399; 555; 903.
- 'Excision of the thyroid for malignant disease; recovery.' The Lancet 1891, 1, 770.
