= Back to Whitechapel =

2013 French historical detective novel

Back to Whitechapel (French: Retour à Whitechapel) is a historical detective novel based on the story of Jack the Ripper, written by French author Michel Moatti, and published by Editions Hervé Chopin, Paris, in 2013.

Retour à Whitechapel has been nominated for the 2013 Historia Book Award (Historical crime novel).

== Background ==
While working as an associate professor of sociology at Montpellier University, Michel Moatti encountered the works of British sociologist Charles Booth, which covered the districts of the East End (and included detailed poverty maps). Moatti used Booth's work to describe the daily life of the inhabitants of Whitechapel during the time period of crimes attributed to Jack the Ripper.

== Plot ==
In 1941, the Germans are bombing London. Amelia Pritlowe is a nurse working at the London Hospital, located in the Whitechapel district. After the death of her father, Mrs. Pritlowe receives a letter from him, stating that she is in fact the daughter of Mary Jane Kelly, Jack the Ripper's fifth and final murder victim, killed in 1888.

Pritlowe develops an obsession with finding her mother's murderer and avenging her death. She becomes a member of a club whose focus is the history of Jack the Ripper. The Filebox Society is located in Spitalfields, the London community where the murder of Amelia's mother occurred. Pritlowe pores over the archives looking for clues. She reads the testimony of various people who saw Mary Jane Kelly on the last day of her life. One living witness, Maria Harvey, her mother's best friend, reveals that she actually cared for Amelia, who was then a child, on the night of November 8, 1888-the eve of her mother's death. Harvey also tells Pritlowe that she spent the night of November 8 at the home of Elizabeth Prater, Mary Jane Kelly's upstairs neighbor.

Puzzled, Pritlowe confides in a member of the Society who had claimed that she could awaken her memories of that night by hypnosis sessions. Pritlowe agrees to be hypnotized, and after a few sessions discovers that she had heard the name of the assassin because she was awake at the time Mary Kelly died. Amelia also discovers that the killer had worked with an accomplice.

According to the archives of the Filebox Society, Amelia learns that the killer has been dead for seven years, but the accomplice is still alive. She is determined to find and confront him.

== Narrative structure ==
Back to Whitechapel alternates between Amelia Pritlowe’s diary, recounting the last weeks of Mary Jane Kelly in Spitalfields, and witnesses testifying at the inquest.

== Critical reaction ==
Premiere, Black Novel, and 20 Minutes praised its realism and Moatti's ability to conjure up the atmosphere of 19th century Whitechapel, which Premiere compared to the writings of Peter Ackroyd.

Julie Malaure, in Le Point considers that "the investigation presented as a thriller turns out absolutely exciting, and exposes a perfectly plausible theory", and Studio said that "the author designates a rather plausible culprit ". Canadian magazine Alibis said the novel is an "excellent summary of events".

Casebook said that the novel is one of "the only two serious books about Jack the Ripper in French".
