= Hawley Harvey Crippen =

American executed homeopath

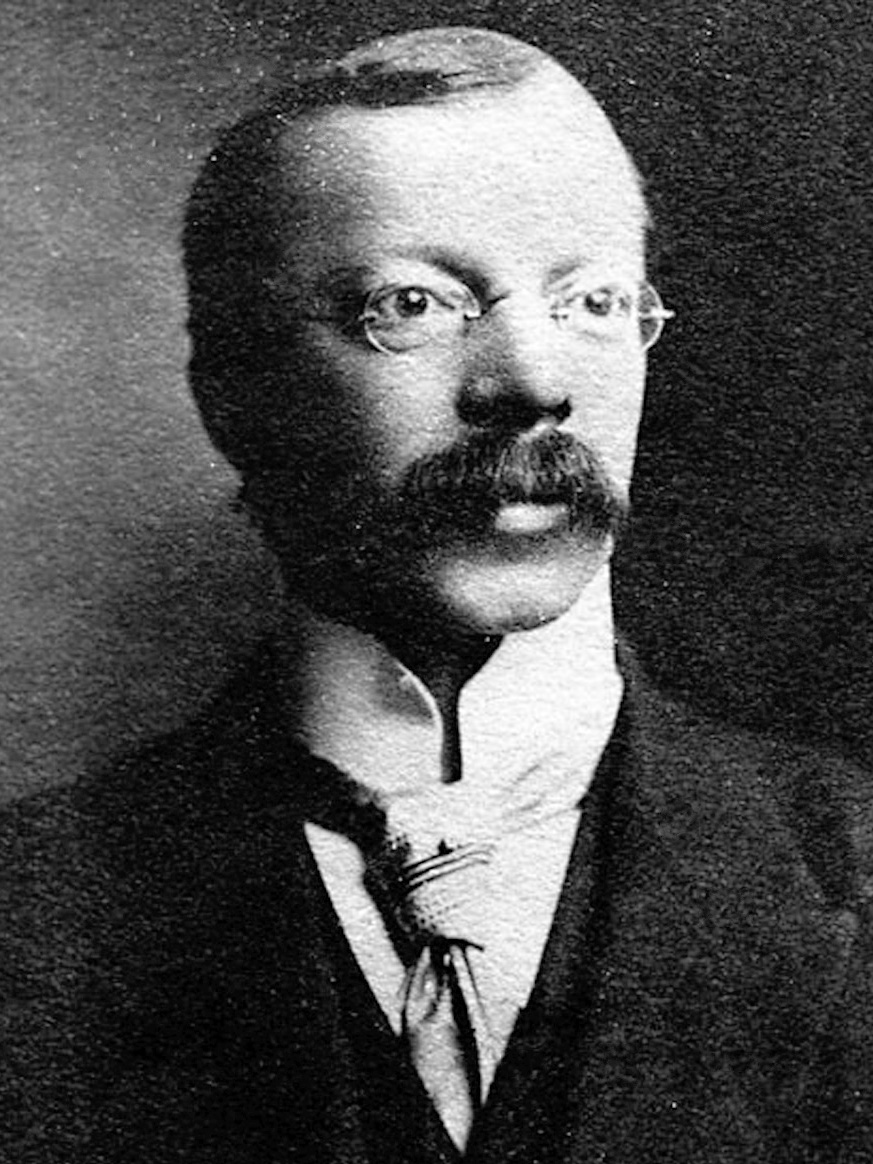
- Crippen, c. 1910
- Born: 11 September 1862; Coldwater, Michigan, US
- Died: 23 November 1910 (aged 48); Pentonville Prison, London, England
- Cause of death: Execution by hanging
- Resting place: HM Prison Pentonville
- Occupation: Homeopath
- Known for: First suspect to be captured with the aid of wireless telegraphy
- Spouse(s): Charlotte Crippen (died 1892) Corrine Henrietta Turner (m. 1894; died 1910)
- Children: 1 son
- Status: Executed
- Conviction: Murder
- Penalty: Death

Details
- Victims: Corrine Henrietta Crippen
- Date: 31 January 1910
- Date apprehended: 31 July 1910

Hawley Harvey Crippen (11 September 1862 – 23 November 1910), colloquially known as Dr. Crippen, was an American homeopath, ear and eye specialist and medicine dispenser who was hanged in Pentonville Prison, London, for the murder of his second wife, Cora Henrietta Crippen. He was the first criminal to be captured with the aid of wireless telegraphy.

== Early life and career ==
Hawley Crippen was born in Coldwater, Michigan, the only surviving child to Andresse Skinner and Myron Augustus Crippen, a merchant. He was educated first at the University of Michigan's homeopathy school, then graduated from the Cleveland Homeopathic Medical College in 1884. After his first wife, Charlotte Jane (née Bell), died of a stroke in 1892, Crippen entrusted his parents, living in San Jose, California, with the care of his son, Hawley Otto (1889–1974).

Having qualified as a homeopath, Crippen started to practise in New York City. In 1894, he married his second wife, Corrine "Cora" Turner (born Kunigunde Mackamotski), a music hall singer who performed under the stage name Belle Elmore. That same year, Crippen started working for prominent homeopath James M. Munyon, moving to London with his wife in 1897 in order to manage Munyon's branch office there.

Crippen's medical qualifications from the United States were not sufficient to allow him to practise as a doctor in the United Kingdom. He initially continued working as a distributor of patent medicines, while Cora embarked on a stage career and socialised with a number of variety players of the time.

After Crippen was sacked by Munyon in 1899, he worked for other patent medicine companies, ultimately being hired as the manager for the Drouet Institute for the Deaf - one of his prescriptions from there is now in the Wellcome Collection. There he hired Ethel Le Neve, a young typist, in 1900. By 1905, the two were having an affair. After living at various addresses around London, Crippen and his wife Cora finally moved to No. 39 Hilldrop Crescent, Camden Road, Holloway, where they took in lodgers to augment Crippen's meagre income. Cora had an affair with one of these lodgers and, in turn, Crippen took Le Neve as his mistress in 1908.

== Murder and disappearance ==
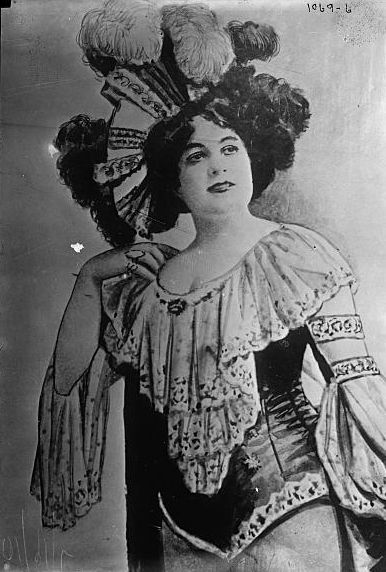
Corrine "Cora" Turner, aka Belle Elmore

On the evening of 31 January 1910, Cora disappeared following a party at the Crippen residence at Hilldrop Crescent. Crippen claimed that she had returned to the US and later added that she had died and had been cremated in California. Meanwhile, Le Neve moved into Hilldrop Crescent and began openly wearing Cora's clothes and jewellery.

Police first heard of Cora's disappearance from her friend, the strongwoman Kate "Vulcana" Williams, but only began to take the matter seriously when asked to investigate by two other friends, the actress Lil Hawthorne and her husband (and manager) John Nash, who pressed their acquaintance, Scotland Yard Superintendent Frank Froest.

During his first questioning by Chief Inspector Walter Dew on 8 July, Crippen admitted that he had fabricated the story about his wife having died, claiming that he did so to avoid personal embarrassment because she had in fact left him and fled to the US with one of her lovers, a music hall actor named Bruce Miller. Dew was satisfied with Crippen's story and searched the house, finding nothing.

However, Crippen and Le Neve assumed Dew had more evidence than he had and fled in panic to Brussels, where they spent the night at a hotel. The following day, they went to Antwerp and boarded the Canadian Pacific liner SS Montrose, bound for Canada. The couple's disappearance led police to perform further searches of the house. The fourth and final search was on 12–13 July, during which they found the torso of a human body buried under the brick floor of the basement. Senior scientific analyst to the Home Office William Willcox found traces of the toxic compound hyoscine hydrobromide (scopolamine) in the torso. The remains were identified as Cora's by a piece of skin from the abdomen; the head, limbs and skeleton were never recovered. The remains were later interred at the St Pancras and Islington Cemetery, East Finchley.

== Transatlantic arrest ==
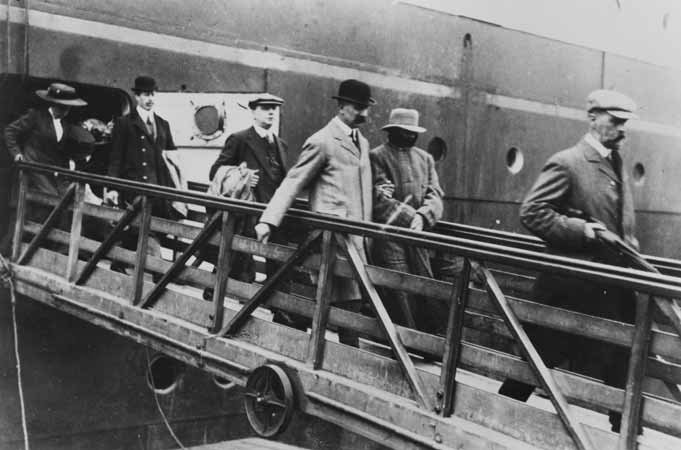
Crippen, disguised, after his arrest

The torso's discovery was enough for arrest warrants to be taken out on both Crippen and Le Neve on 16 July. They were already crossing the Atlantic aboard Montrose, with Le Neve disguised as a boy. Captain Henry George Kendall recognised the fugitives and, just before steaming beyond the range of his ship-board transmitter, had telegraphist Lawrence Ernest Hughes send a wireless telegram to the British authorities:

Have strong suspicions that Crippen London cellar murderer and accomplice are among saloon passengers. Mustache taken off growing beard. Accomplice dressed as boy. Manner and build undoubtedly a girl.

Had Crippen travelled third class, he probably would have escaped Kendall's notice. Dew boarded a faster White Star liner, SS Laurentic, from Liverpool, arrived in Quebec ahead of Crippen, and contacted the Canadian authorities.

As Montrose entered the St. Lawrence River, Dew came aboard on 31 July disguised as a pilot. Canada was then still a dominion within the British Empire. If Crippen, an American citizen, had sailed to the US instead, even if he had been recognised, it would have taken extradition proceedings to bring him to trial. Dew and a Canadian police officer quickly joined Kendall on the bridge and the latter then invited Crippen to meet the pilots. Dew removed his pilot's cap and said, "Good morning, Dr. Crippen. Do you know me? I'm Chief Inspector Dew from Scotland Yard." After a pause, Crippen replied, "Thank God it's over. The suspense has been too great. I couldn't stand it any longer." The Canadian officer then arrested Crippen as he held out his wrists for the handcuffs, doing the same to Le Neve soon afterwards.

On 4 August, Detective Sergeant Arthur Mitchell began his journey to join Dew in Canada by taking a train from Euston station to Liverpool - with him he took Sarah Foster and Julia Stone, two wardresses from Holloway Prison who would have charge of Le Neve. The prisoners, officers and wardresses landed at Liverpool from the SS Megantic on 27 August and then travelled to London on the London and North Western Railway, which the Met thanked for its assistance during that journey.

== Trial ==
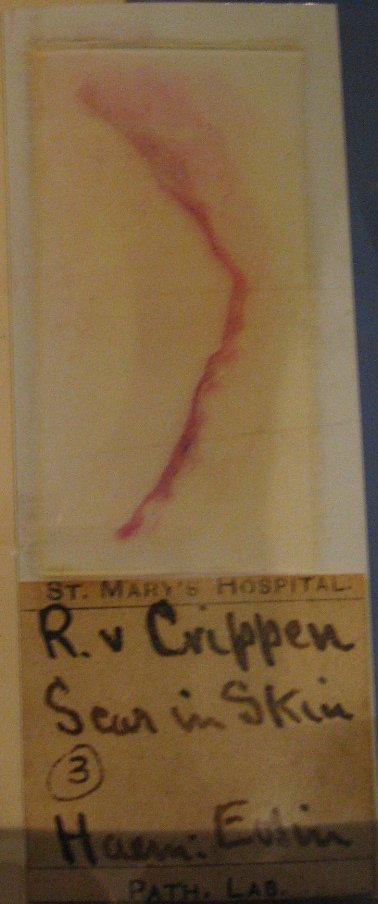
Alleged scar tissue used in evidence at the trial, claimed to be that of Cora Crippen

Crippen was tried at the Old Bailey before the Lord Chief Justice, Lord Alverstone, on 18 October 1910. The proceedings lasted four days.

The first prosecution witnesses were pathologists. One of them, Bernard Spilsbury, testified they could not identify the torso remains or even discern whether they were male or female. However, Spilsbury found a piece of skin with what he claimed to be an abdominal scar consistent with Cora's medical history. Large quantities of scopolamine were found in the remains, and Crippen had purchased the drug from a local chemist before Cora's disappearance.

Crippen's defence, led by Alfred Tobin, maintained that Cora had fled to the US with Bruce Miller and that Cora and Hawley had been living at the house only since 1905, suggesting a previous owner of the house was responsible for the placement of the remains. The defence asserted that the abdominal scar identified by Spilsbury was really just folded tissue, for, among other things, it had hair follicles growing from it, something scar tissue could not have; Spilsbury observed that the sebaceous glands appeared at the ends but not in the middle of the scar.

Other evidence presented by the prosecution included a piece of a man's pyjama top, supposedly from a pair Cora had given Crippen a year earlier. The pyjama bottoms were found in Crippen's bedroom, but not the top. The fragment included the manufacturer's label, Jones Bros. Testimony from a Jones Bros. representative stated that the product was not sold prior to 1908, thus placing the date of manufacture well within the time period of when the Crippens occupied the house and when Cora gave the garment to Crippen the year before in 1909. Curlers, and bleached hair consistent with Cora's, were also found with the remains.

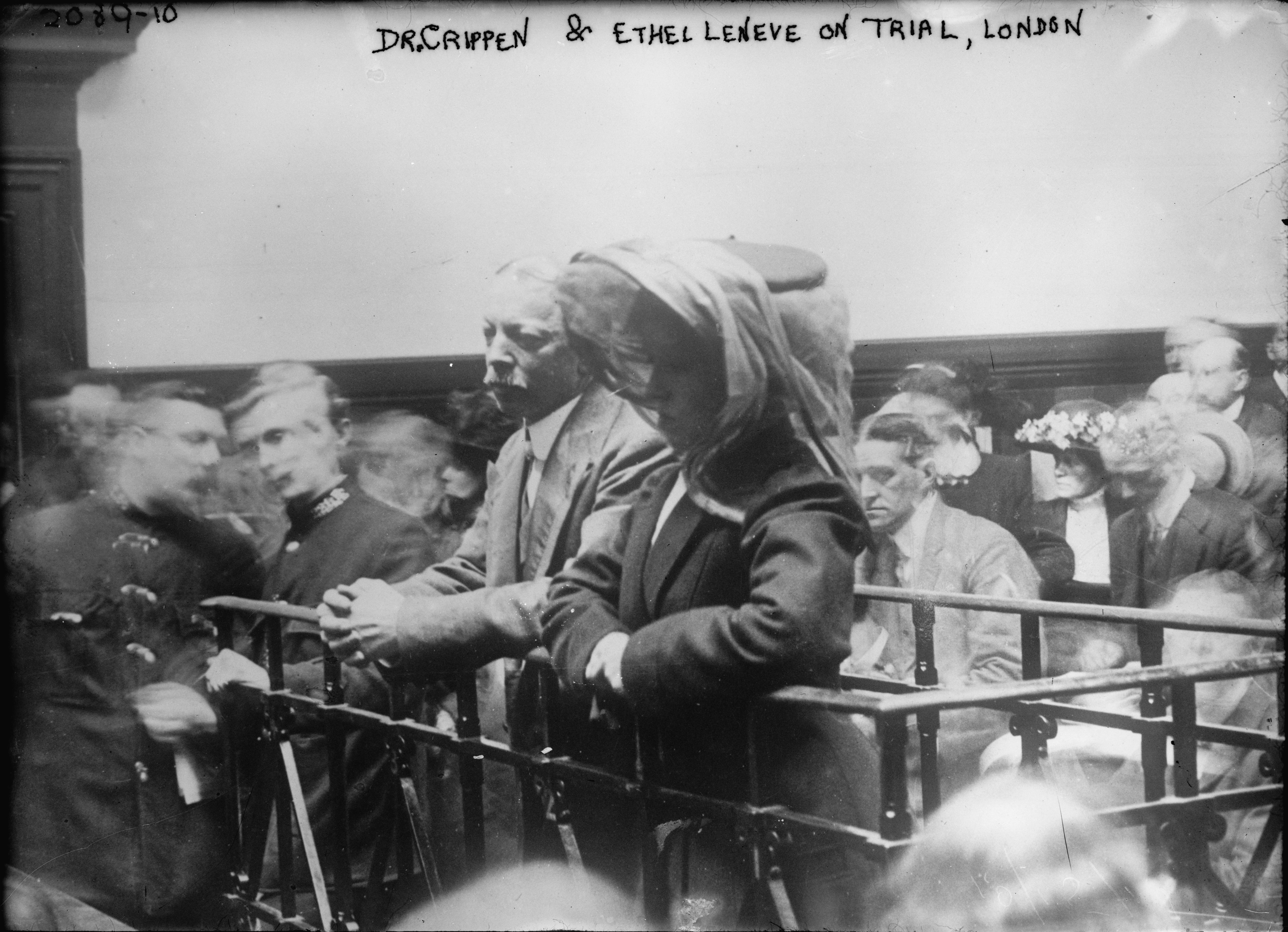
Crippen and Le Neve on trial

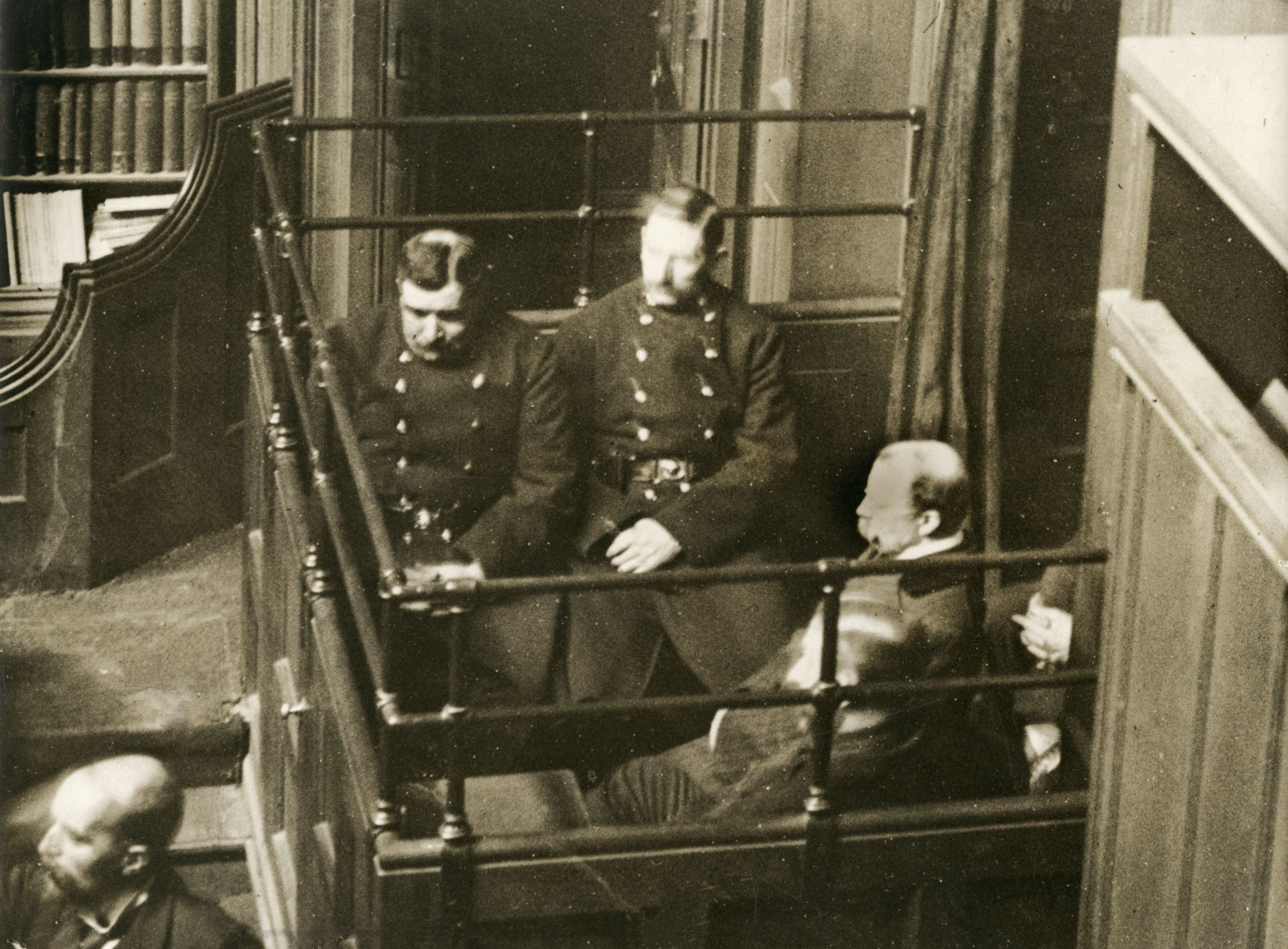
Crippen in court during the passing of the death sentence

Throughout the proceedings and at his sentencing, Crippen showed no remorse for his wife, only concern for his lover's reputation. The jury found Crippen guilty of murder after just twenty-seven minutes of deliberations. Le Neve was charged only with being an accessory after the fact and acquitted.

Although Crippen never gave any reason for killing his wife, several theories have been propounded. One was by the late Victorian and Edwardian barrister Edward Marshall Hall, who believed that Crippen was using scopolamine on his wife as a depressant or anaphrodisiac but accidentally gave her an overdose and then panicked when she died. It is said that Hall declined to lead Crippen's defence because another theory was to be propounded.

In 1981, several British newspapers reported that Sir Hugh Rhys Rankin claimed to have encountered Le Neve in Australia, where she told him that Crippen murdered his wife because she had syphilis.

=== Execution ===
Crippen was hanged by John Ellis at Pentonville Prison, London, at 9 am on Wednesday 23 November 1910.

Le Neve sailed to the US before settling in Canada and finding work as a typist. She returned to Britain in 1915 and died in 1967. At Crippen's request, a photograph of Le Neve was placed in his coffin and buried with him.

Although Crippen's grave in Pentonville's grounds is not marked by a stone, tradition has it that soon after his burial, a rose bush was planted over it.

Before he was executed, Crippen wrote a letter to Ethel Le Neve. In it, he said, "Face to face with God, I believe that facts will be forthcoming to prove my innocence." It is claimed that modern forensic science has now fulfilled his prophecy.

== Crippen's guilt ==
Questions have arisen about the investigation, trial and evidence that convicted Crippen in 1910. Dornford Yates, a junior barrister at the original trial, wrote in his memoirs, As Berry and I Were Saying, that Lord Alverstone took the very unusual step, at the request of the prosecution, of refusing to give a copy of the sworn affidavit used to issue the arrest warrant to Crippen's defence counsel. The judge without challenge accepted the prosecution's argument that the withholding of the document would not prejudice the accused's case. Yates said he knew why the prosecution did this but – despite the passage of years – refused to disclose why. Yates noted that although Crippen placed the torso in dry quicklime to be destroyed, he did not realise that when it became wet it turned into slaked lime, which is a preservative, a fact that Yates used in the plot of his novel The House That Berry Built.

The American-British crime novelist Raymond Chandler thought it unbelievable that Crippen could be so stupid as to bury his wife's torso under the cellar floor of his home while successfully disposing of her head and limbs.

Another theory is that Crippen was carrying out illegal abortions and the torso was that of one of his patients who died and not his wife.

=== New scientific evidence ===
In October 2007, Michigan State University forensic scientist David Foran claimed that mitochondrial DNA evidence showed the remains found in Crippen's cellar were not those of his wife. Researchers used genealogy to identify three living relatives of Cora Crippen (great-nieces). By providing mitochondrial DNA haplotype, researchers were able to compare their DNA with that extracted from a microscope slide containing flesh taken from the torso in Crippen's cellar. The original remains were also tested using a highly sensitive assay of the Y chromosome that found the flesh sample on the slide was male.

The same research team also argued that a scar found on the torso's abdomen, which the original trial's prosecution argued was the same one Mrs. Crippen was known to have, was incorrectly identified. The scientists found hair follicles in the tissue, which should not be present in scars, a medical fact that Crippen's defence used at his trial. Their research was published in the August 2010 issue of the Journal of Forensic Sciences.

Inconsistencies in the evidence and suppressed documents caused James Patrick Crippen, the closest living male relative of Crippen, to formally request the British government pardon the doctor and repatriate his remains to America.

However, the new scientific evidence for Crippen's innocence has been disputed. In The Times, journalist David Aaronovitch wrote: "As to the body being male, well the American team was using a 'special technique' that is 'very new' and 'done only by this team' and working on a single, century-old slide, described by the team leader as a 'less than optimal sample'". Foran responded by saying "tests showed unequivocally that the remains were male".

Traces of the blonde hair found in curlers at the scene are now preserved in the Metropolitan Police's Crime Museum. Another researcher said they asked to be provided with samples from them for DNA testing, but the request has been denied several times. However, New Scotland Yard was willing to test a hair from the crime scene for a fee, which in turn was rejected by the investigators as "over the top". Researchers hypothesised that the police planted the body parts and particularly the fragment of the pyjama top at the scene to incriminate Crippen. He suggests that Scotland Yard was under tremendous public pressure to find and bring to trial a suspect for this heinous crime. An independent observer points out that the case did not become public until after the remains were found.

In December 2009, the UK's Criminal Cases Review Commission, having reviewed the case, declared that the Court of Appeal will not hear the case to pardon Crippen posthumously.

== Media portrayals ==
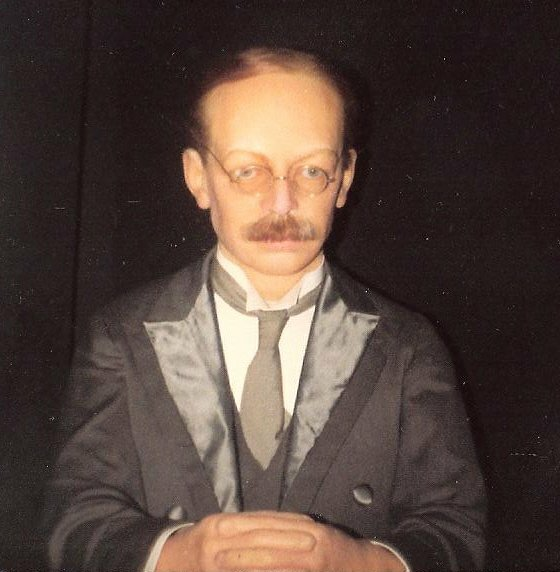
Waxwork of Dr. Crippen in the Chamber of Horrors at Madame Tussauds in London (pictured 1984)

- The case inspired the 1910 Australian play By Wireless Telegraphy.
- Crippen is mentioned in Agatha Christie's The Man in the Brown Suit (1924), The Murder at the Vicarage (1930), and Three Act Tragedy/Murder in Three Acts (1934).
- The murder inspired Arthur Machen's 1927 short story "The Islington Mystery", which in turn was adapted as the 1960 Mexican film El Esqueleto de la señora Morales.
- The gang defeated by Elsa Lanchester in the H.G. Wells-scripted crime comedy Blue Bottles (1928) is revealed to be related to the Crippen case.
- The case is thought to have inspired the 1935 novel We, the Accused by Ernest Raymond.
- The German 1942 feature film Doctor Crippen on Board, directed by Erich Engels, stars Rudolf Fernau in the title role. (A 1958 Engels film Doctor Crippen Lives is neither a sequel nor about Crippen.)
- The character of Mr. Pugh in the radio drama Under Milk Wood (1954), by Dylan Thomas, is described as sporting a "nicotine-eggyellow weeping walrus Victorian moustache worn thick and long in memory of Doctor Crippen". Throughout the play, he obsessively fantasises about murdering his wife, but never attempts to do so.
- The 1961 Wolf Mankowitz-Monty Norman musical Belle, or The Ballad of Dr Crippen at London's Strand Theatre was based on the case.
- The British 1962 feature film Dr. Crippen stars Donald Pleasence in the title role and Samantha Eggar as Le Neve.
- The BBC Sitcom: "Meet The Wife" which aired on 20 December 1965 (Series 4, Episode 5: "The Merry Widow") starring Thora Hird and Freddie Frinton. In an argument with her husband, Thora Hird says: "Look, If I believed you... Crippen would be innocent!"
- The British 1968 film Negatives features Peter McEnery and Glenda Jackson as a couple whose erotic fantasies involve dressing up as Crippen and Ethel le Neve.
- The American TV series Ironside presented an episode (season 2, episode 16, 23 January 1969: "Why the Tuesday Afternoon Bridge Club Met on Thursday") in which a neurotic man assumed Dr. Crippen's identity and committed a similar murder.
- In Carry On Loving, which was made and set in 1970, there is a jokily anachronistic reference to the Crippen case: Peter Butterworth appears in Edwardian costume, visiting a marriage bureau to seek a third wife, having dispatched both his first two. He is jokingly referred to as "Dr Crippen", despite not being a direct version of the person.
- In the 1972 season of Australian TV soap opera, Number 96, a plot line involving the death of Sylvia Vansard (in which her estranged chemist husband and his mistress are the main suspects), deliberately homages the Crippen story. It was referenced in the official synopses provided to the screenwriters.
- In the play A Tomb with a View by Norman Robbins, Dr. Crippen is mentioned in a line of dialog.
- Lady Killers series 2 episode 1 "Miss Elmore" (1981).
- The Crippen saga is the basis for 1982's The False Inspector Dew, a detective novel by Peter Lovesey.
- The 1989 BBC series Shadow of the Noose, about the life of barrister Edward Marshall Hall, includes an abortive attempt on Hall's part to defend Crippen (played by David Hatton).
- John Boyne wrote the 2004 novel Crippen – A Novel of Murder.
- Erik Larson's 2006 book Thunderstruck interwove the story of the murder with the history of Guglielmo Marconi's invention of radio.
- Martin Edwards wrote the 2008 novel Dancing for the Hangman, which re-interprets the case while seeking to adhere to the established evidence.
- The PBS series Secrets of the Dead episode "Executed in Error" (2008) explored new findings in the Crippen case.
- In A Fantastic Fear of Everything (2012), when British author Jack's literary agent sets up a meeting between him and an American named Harvey Humphries, Jack's paranoia leads him to believe he is really Dr. Crippen come back to kill him, based on the shared name and nationality. When Mr. Humphries appears on screen he is the spitting image of Dr. Crippen.
- Dan Weatherer's stage play Crippen (2016) explores the life and crimes of Dr. Hawley Crippen while taking into account new evidence and presenting an alternative theory as to who lay buried beneath the cellar floor.
- The episode titled "The London Cellar Murder" of the podcast Scotland Yard Confidential focuses on the Crippen case.
- The Crippen case was popularised in a Music Hall song with the lyrics: "Dr. Crippen, killed Belle Elmore, ran away with Miss Le Neve. Right across the ocean blue, followed by Inspector Drew. Ships ahoy, naughty boy."
- Author Earl Derr Biggers' fourth Charlie Chan mystery novel, Charlie Chan Carries On, copyrighted in 1930, includes a reference to the Crippen murder case. Scotland Yard Chief Inspector Duff is investigating the death of an elderly American in a London hotel. It is a difficult case and Duff meets with his superior. The superintendent reminds him that the Crippen affair took many months to solve.

== See also ==
- John Reginald Christie, English serial killer
- John George Haigh, English serial killer known as the "Acid Bath Murderer"
- Michael Swango, American serial killer
- John Tawell, British murderer and the first criminal to be captured with the use of telecommunications technology
- Dorothea Waddingham, English nursing home matron and murderer
- Adolph Luetgert, infamous murderer convicted in 1897 of killing his wife despite a lack of identifiable remains.
