= African Steamship Company =

British shipping line in the 19th and early 20th centuries

- Industry: Shipping
- Founded: 1852; Liverpool, England
- Defunct: 1891
- Fate: Wound up
- Successor: Elder, Dempster & Co Limited
- Headquarters: Liverpool, England
- Key people: Macgregor Laird, Owen Philipps, W J Pirrie (Director)

The African Steamship Company was a British shipping line in the 19th and early 20th centuries.

== History ==
The company was founded in 1852 by Macgregor Laird, the younger son of the shipbuilder William Laird, and based in Birkenhead. The main focus of the company at first was trading with the Niger River area and other west African ports, bringing west-African palm oil back to Britain. The monthly mail steamer to the then Gold Coast (now Ghana), appointed by Royal Charter, came with a subsidy of 30,000 pounds sterling per year from the British government, starting from 1852.

In 1864 the African Steamship Company was taken over by Fletcher & Parr of Liverpool and, in turn, in 1891 absorbed into Elder Dempster & Co.

The company proved sufficiently successful that in 1869 a rival company, the British and African Steam Navigation Company, was founded, but both companies later came to an arrangement on sailing times. The business of the African Steamship company was purchased by Elder, Dempster and Company, Limited in 1891, who had bought the British and African Steam Navigation Company two years earlier, although both companies continued operating as distinct organisations.

Further expansion began with a transatlantic route using large cargo vessels, trading from Liverpool to the St Lawrence River and from Liverpool to the southern ports of the United States. A later route from Bristol to St Lawrence was also established.

The company also diversified into a number of businesses related to the trade, including a bank, oil-mills for processing the palm oil, a hotel in Grand Canary for tourists, and a fruit brokerage in London to deal with the banana trade.

Trade with the West Indies began in 1901, with a direct, fortnightly service from Avonmouth to Jamaica, subsidised by the Colonial Office.

As part of Elder Dempster, the company was purchased by the Royal Mail Group in 1909.
