= Ethel Le Neve =

Mistress of Dr. Crippen (1883–1967)

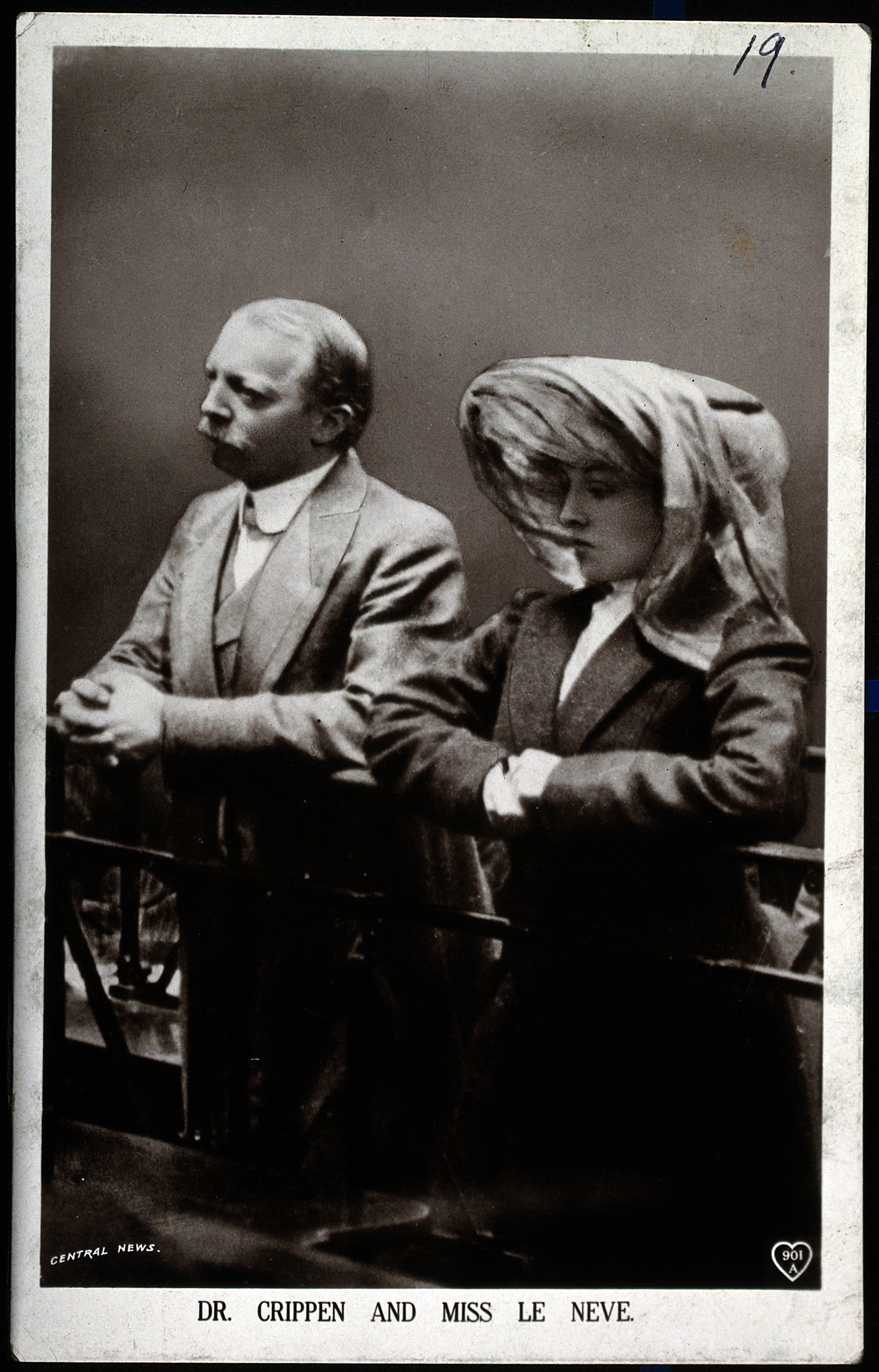
- Le Neve and Crippen during a remand hearing in 1910
- Born: Ethel Clara Neave; 22 January 1883; Diss, Norfolk
- Died: 9 August 1967 (aged 84); Croydon, England
- Occupation: Typist
- Known for: Mistress of Dr. Crippen
- Spouse: Stanley Smith (m. 1915)
- Criminal charge: Accessory to murder
- Penalty: Acquitted

Details
- Date apprehended: 31 July 1910

Ethel Clara Neave (21 January 1883 – 9 August 1967), known as Ethel Le Neve, was the mistress of Dr. Hawley Harvey Crippen, a homeopath hanged for the murder and mutilation of his wife in 1910.

== Life history ==
She was born in Diss, Norfolk, the eldest child of Walter William Neave, a railway clerk, and Charlotte Anne Neave (née Jones). Ethel was hired as a typist by Crippen in 1900; he was conducting an affair with her by 1905, and took her as his mistress by 1908.

After the murder of Crippen's wife, Cora, early in 1910, they fled the country to Belgium. Then, with Ethel disguised as a boy, they sailed for Canada on the SS Montrose. On the ship the couple aroused the suspicion of the ship's master, who telegraphed their location to Scotland Yard. Scotland Yard sent Chief Inspector Walter Dew to arrest them upon their arrival in Canada. Returned to England, she was exonerated of the charge of complicity to murder.

Between his conviction and execution Crippen made a will, appointing Le Neve his executrix and leaving all his estate to her. Crippen's wife had died intestate, and Le Neve applied for letters of administration of her estate. The probate court refused her application on the ground that, as Crippen would not have been permitted to profit from murdering his wife, anyone claiming under him was also debarred from benefiting from his crime.

After the trial, Le Neve travelled to Toronto, working as a typist there for three years before returning to London under the name Ethel Harvey. While working at Hampton's furniture store off Trafalgar Square, she met and in January 1915 married Stanley Smith, with whom she had two children. They lived in Croydon, where Ethel died in 1967.

== In popular culture ==
Ethel Le Neve was portrayed by Hannah Gordon in the Granada Television series Lady Killers and by Samantha Eggar in the 1962 feature film Dr. Crippen.
