= Michel Moatti =

French writer

Moatti at the Brive Book Fair in 2022

Michel Moatti (born 3 August 1958) is a French journalist, novelist and writer as well as a maître de conférences in sociology at the University of Montpellier. He works on public opinion, the media and violence on the internet. His works are mainly published by Éditions Hervé Chopin and in paperback form in the Grands détectives and Domaine policier collections of 10/18.

== Life ==
Born in Bouttencourt, he has a doctorate in sociology (University of Montpellier, supervised by Jean-Bruno Renard) and a licence in political sciences (Université de Paris I Panthéon-Sorbonne). He did his military service in Morocco before being recruited by the French diplomatic corps, serving in Rabat and Fès.

He has held a journalist's card since 1986 and was a correspondent for different press agencies such as APE and Reuters.

== Works ==
=== Novels ===
- Retour à Whitechapel, preface by Stéphane Durand-Souffland, Paris, Éditions Hervé Chopin, (2013), 350 p. ISBN 978-2-357-20136-1 ; republished, Paris, Pocket No. 15714 (2014) ISBN 978-2-266-24242-4 ; republished, Paris, 10/18, Grands détectives collection No. 5020 (2015) ISBN 978-2-264-06725-8
- Blackout Baby, Paris, Éditions Hervé Chopin, (2014), 352 p., ISBN 978-2-357-20197-2 ; republished, Paris, Le Grand Livre du Mois, (2014) ISBN 978-2-286-11584-5 ; republished, Paris, 10/18, Grands détectives collection No. 505 (2016) ISBN 978-2-264-06679-4
- Alice change d’adresse, Paris, Éditions Hervé Chopin, 304 p., (2016), ISBN 978-2-357-20268-9 ; republished, Paris, 10/18, Domaine policier collection No. 5193 (2017) ISBN 978-2-264-06990-0
- Tu n'auras pas peur, Paris, Éditions Hervé Chopin, 480 p., (2017) ISBN 978-2-357-20319-8; republished, Paris, 10/18, Domaine policier collection No. 5370 (2018) ISBN 978-2-264-07286-3
- Les Retournants, Paris, Éditions Hervé Chopin, 272 p., (2018) ISBN 978-2357203631; republished, Paris, 10/18, Grands détectives collection No. 5417, (2019) ISBN 978-2-264-07424-9
- Un ami de la famille, Paris, Éditions Hervé Chopin, 224 p. (2018) ISBN 978-2357204300, sub titled Rapport sur Nordahl L. (Note: Moatti's sixth novel, it was due to be published on 4 October 2018, but this was pushed back at the request of Nordahl Lelandais's lawyers, placed under formal investigation in the Maëlys case due to potential violations of the presumption of innocence.)
- Et tout sera silence, Paris, Éditions Hervé Chopin, 320 p.,(2019) ISBN 978-2357204737. Republished, Paris, 10/18, (2020) ISBN 978-2264076236
- Les Jardins d'hiver, Paris, Éditions Hervé Chopin, 288 p. (2020) ISBN 9782357205482
- Dog Island, Paris, HC éditions, 480 p. (2021) ISBN 978-2357206137
- Rapport sur Nordahl L., preface by Jennifer De Araujo, Paris, Éditions Hervé Chopin, 288 p. (2022) ISBN 978-2357206755
- Lancaster, Paris, HC éditions (2023) ISBN 978-2357207363
- Darwin, le dernier chapitre, Paris, Éditions Hervé Chopin (2024) ISBN 978-2357207967. Republished in paperback, Paris, 10/18, (2025) ISBN 978-2264085702.
- Moscou & blessures, Moby Dick, (2025) ISBN 978-2820703453. Volume n°7 of the "La fille du Poulpe" series, edited by Serguei Dounovetz, all of which reused characters created by Jean-Bernard Pouy in the "Le Poulpe" collection.
- Rebecca, Éditions Hervé Chopin, (2025) ISBN 978-2357208988
- Lumières noires, Paris, Éditions Hervé Chopin (2026) ISBN 978-2357209985.

=== Audio books ===
- Retour à Whitechapel and Blackout Baby, (2019), Audible Studios, read by Marie-Eve Dufresne.
- Lancaster, December 2023, published by Voolume, distributed by Audible, read by Stéphanie Cassignard, music by Benoît Cheritel.
- Tu n'auras pas peur and Tout sera silence ("Les enquêtes de Lynn Dunsday"), 2024 by Voolume, distributed by Audible, read by Stéphanie Cassignard.
- Rapport sur Nordahl L., republished (Voolume, distributed by Audible), read by Stéphanie Cassignard.
- Lumières noires, 2026, (Hervé Chopin/Voolume, distributed by Audible), read by Maëlia Gentil.

=== Essays ===
- La Vie cachée d’Internet, Paris, Éditions Imago, (2002) ISBN 2-911416-67-8
- L’Effet-Médias - Pour une sociologie critique de l'information, written in collaboration with Sarah Finger, Paris, DesHauts&Débats/L’Harmattan, (2010) ISBN 978-2-296-12260-4.

=== Other ===
- Alias Abel Demain, in the review "Il était une fois dans la bibliothèque", edited by Patrick Coulomb, Éditions Gaussen, 2019, ISBN 978-2356981776.
- 'Une affaire d’identité' (October 1888) in Roy Pinker, Faits divers & vies déviantes – XIX-XXI siecles, Paris, Éditions du CNRS, 2022, ed. Marie-Ève Thérenty, ISBN 9782271142276.
- 'La Justine et l’Olympia-1867 - Un cold case sous la mer' (preface), Laurence Serra, Le Papillon rouge, 2022, ISBN 978-2490379484.

== Prizes and recognition ==
- Darwin, le dernier chapitre - "Prix Max Gallo". for a historic novel in 2024 and winner of the Prix Brittany Ferries – Étonnants Voyageurs 2025
- Tu n’auras pas peur - 2017 prize for best French-language novel at the Festival Polar de Cognac
- Retour à Whitechapel - finalist in the Prix Historia 2013 and the Prix Sang d'encre 2013.
- Blackout Baby and "Alice change d'adresse". - 2015 and 2016 Readers' Prize at the Festival Polar de Cognac.
- Les Retournants - finalist for the Prix Landerneau Polar 2018
- Et tout sera silence - nominated for the readers' prize at the Villeneuve-lès-Avignon Festival 2020 and the Sang d'Encre festival, Vienne 2020.
- Les Jardins d'Hiver - nominated for the Prix "Noir" at the Rendez-vous de l'Histoire, Blois, 2021, and for the readers' prize at the Festival de Villeneuve-lès-Avignon 2021.
- Dog Island - nominated for the readers' prize at the Festival Sans Nom, Mulhouse, 2021.

== External links (in French) ==
- "Site Auteur Éditions 10/18".
- "Site Auteur HC Éditions".
