= Port of Quebec =

Port of Québec Port de Québec
- Click on the map for a fullscreen view

Location
- Country: Canada
- Location: Quebec City, Quebec; Lévis, Quebec
- Coordinates: 46.821°N 71.204°W
- UN/LOCODE: CAQUE

Details
- Opened: 1608 (city founded), 1858 (port authority founded)
- Operated by: Quebec Port Authority
- Owned by: Government of Canada
- Size of harbour: 35 km^{2} (14 sq mi)
- Land area: 210 hectares (520 acres)
- No. of wharfs: 30
- Draft depth: 16.7 m.
- Chairman: Me François Amyot
- President & CEO: Olga Farman

Statistics
- Annual cargo tonnage: 27,6 million metric revenue tons (2018)
- Passenger traffic: 230,940 (2018)
- Annual revenue: C$36.7 million (2018)
- Website http://www.portquebec.ca/

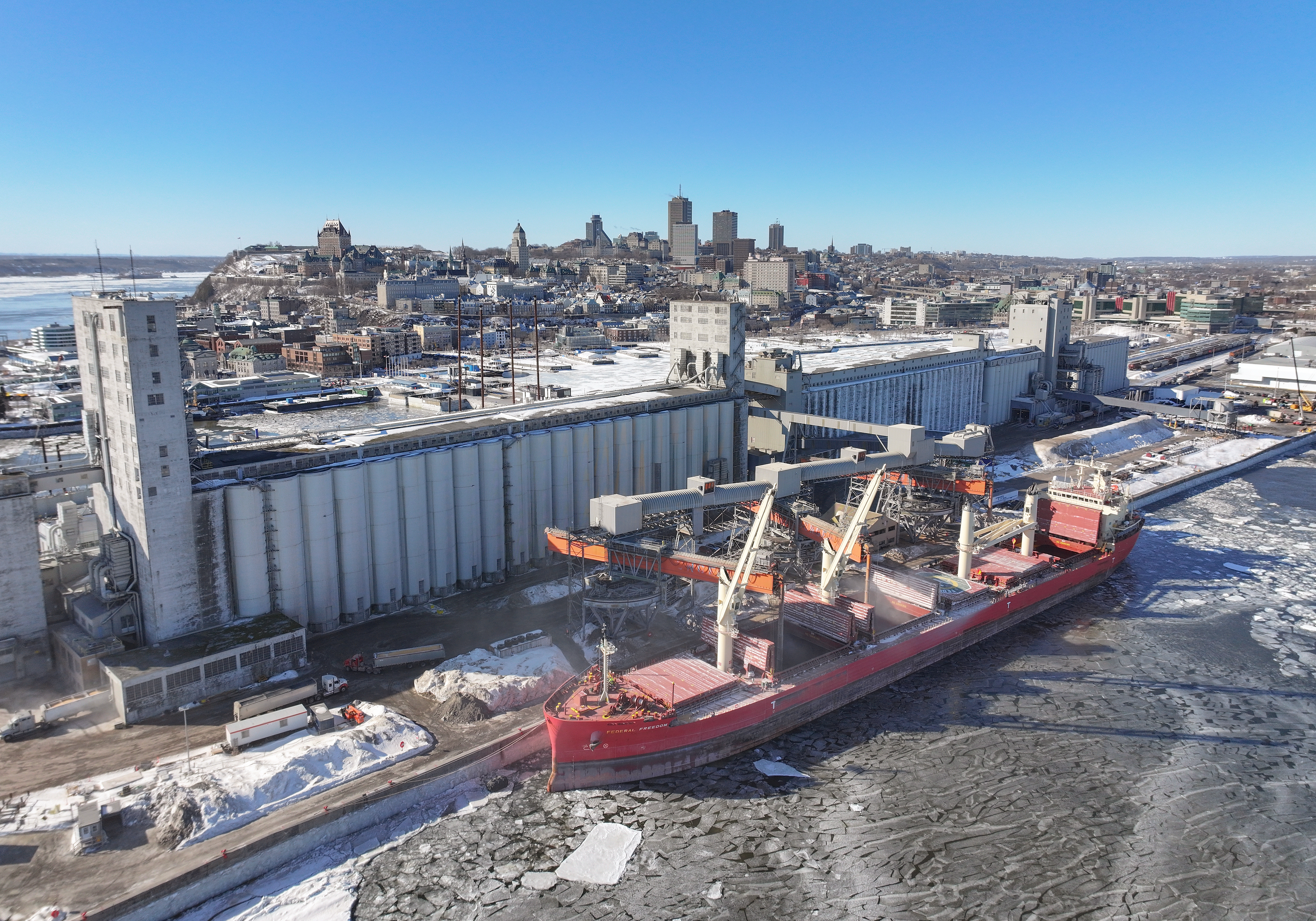
Grain being loaded onto a bulk carrier

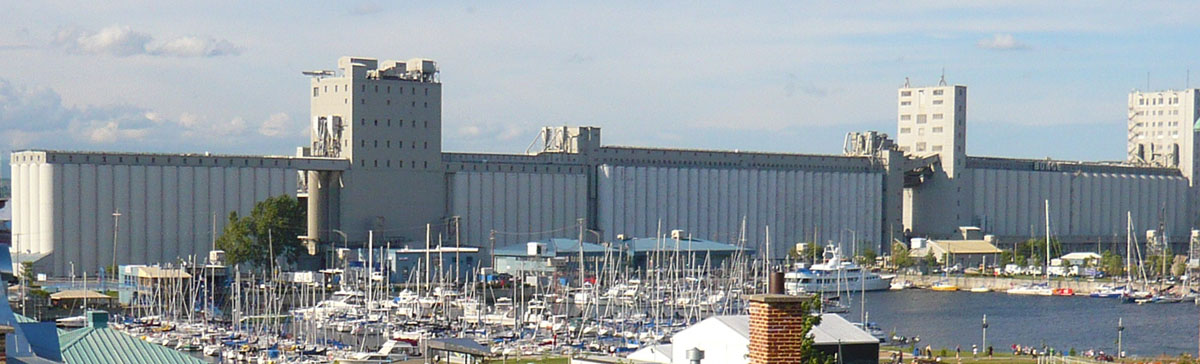
Grain Elevator on the Louise Bassin.

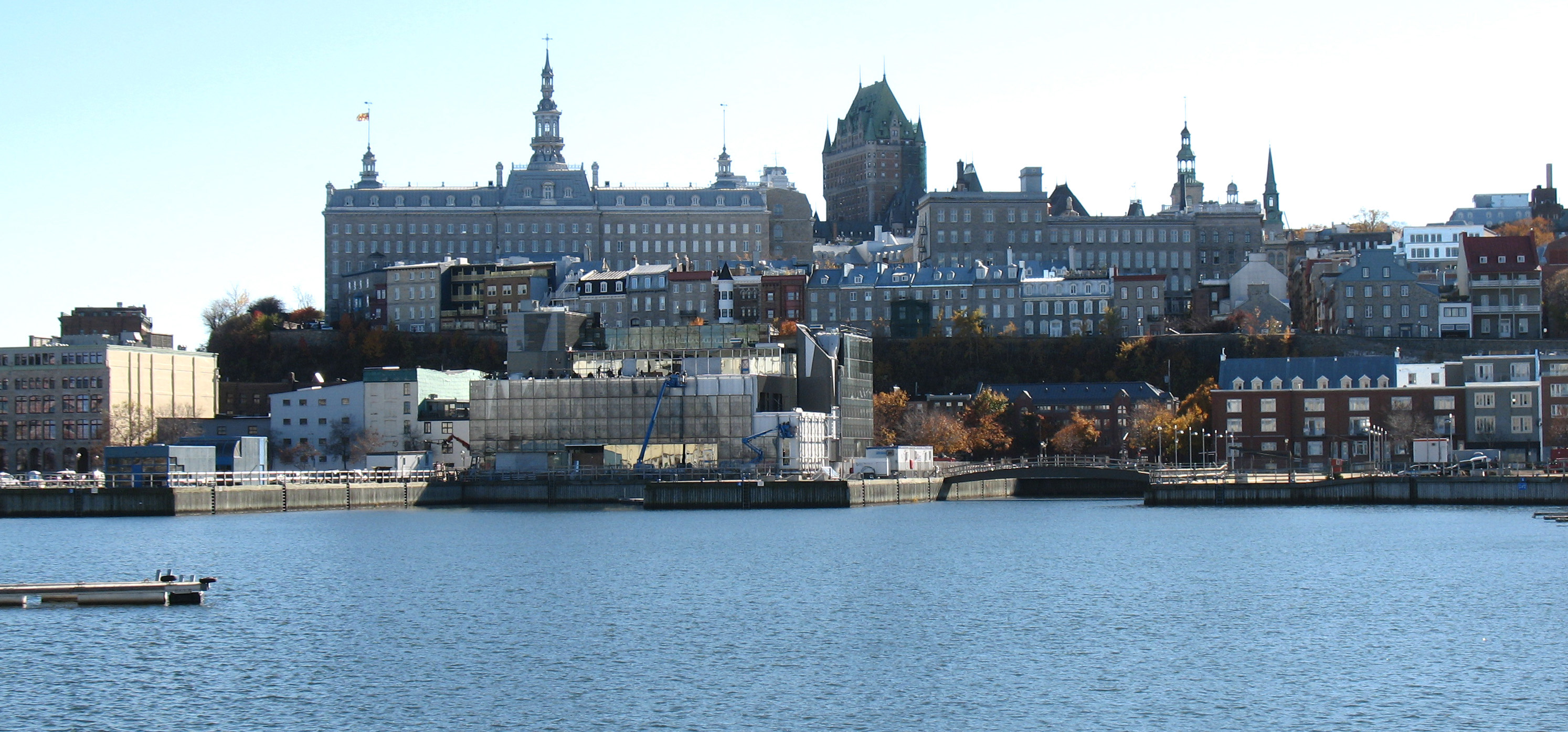
Louise Bassin, and Old Quebec.

The Port of Quebec (French: Port de Québec) is an inland port located in Quebec City, Quebec, Canada. It is the oldest port in Canada, and the second largest in Quebec after the Port of Montreal.

== History ==
In the 19th century, the Port of Quebec was one of the most important in the world. It played a major role in the development of both the city and of Canada. In 1863, more than 1,600 ships went through the port, transporting almost 25,000 sailors. It was during this era that the shipbuilding industry grew considerably in Quebec City.

In the 20th century, the dredging of the Saint Lawrence River between Quebec City and Montreal moved major port activities upstream. Today cruise traffic has replaced much of the former freight traffic.
