= Inglefield =

Inglefield may refer to:

== Geography ==
In Canada:

- The Inglefield Mountains in southeastern Ellesmere Island

In the United States:

- Inglefield, Indiana

In Greenland

- Inglefield Gulf
- Inglefield Land

== Naval history ==
- HMS Inglefield, a World War II Royal Navy destroyer launched in 1936 and sunk off Anzio on 25 February 1944

== People ==
- Sir Thomas Englefield (or Inglefield) (c. 1450–1514), Speaker of England's House of Commons from 1496 to 1497 and again in 1509
- Sir Derrick William Inglefield Inglefield-Watson (1901–1987) and Sir John Forbes Inglefield-Watson (1926–2007), 4th and 5th Watson baronets of Earnock
- John Nicholson Inglefield (1748–1828), Royal Navy officer and father of Samuel Hood Inglefield
- Samuel Hood Inglefield (1783–1848), a distinguished Royal Navy officer, artist and father of Edward Augustus Inglefield
- Sir Edward Augustus Inglefield (1820–1894), a Royal Navy officer, arctic explorer and father of Edward Fitzmaurice Inglefield
- Sir Edward Fitzmaurice Inglefield (1861–1945), a Royal Navy officer, son of Edward Augustus Inglefield, inventor of the Inglefield clip, and later Secretary of Lloyd's of London
- Sir Frederick Samuel Inglefield (1854–1921), Royal Navy admiral.
- Sir Gilbert Inglefield (1909–1991), Lord Mayor of the City of London in 1967, son of Sir Frederick Samuel Inglefield.

== Other uses ==
- Inglefield clip, a clip for joining flags quickly, easily and securely to flag halyards
