= Admiral Inglefield =

Admiral Inglefield may refer to:

- Edward Augustus Inglefield (1820–1894), British Royal Navy admiral
- Edward Fitzmaurice Inglefield (1861–1945), British Royal Navy rear admiral
- Frederick Inglefield (1854–1921), British Royal Navy admiral
- Samuel Inglefield (1783–1848), British Royal Navy rear admiral
