= HMS Mariner =

Five ships of the Royal Navy have been named HMS Mariner:

- The first HMS Mariner (1801), launched in 1801, was a 12-gun brig, sold in 1814.
- The second HMS Mariner (1846), launched in 1846, was a 16-gun brig, sold in 1865.
- The third Mariner, launched in 1844 as HMS Juno (1844) was a 26-gun sixth-rate, renamed Mariner in 1878, and renamed Atalanta in 1878. She foundered in the Atlantic in 1880.
- The fourth HMS Mariner (1884), launched in 1884, was a Mariner-class composite screw sloop, sold in 1929.
- The fifth HMS Mariner (J380), launched in 1944, was an Algerine-class minesweeper. She was transferred to the Burmese Navy in 1958 and renamed Yan Myo Aung.
