= Guybon Chesney Castell Damant =

English physiologist, diver, royal navy officer, and researcher

Captain Guybon Damant CBE
- Born: 25 July 1881; Isle of Wight, England
- Died: 29 June 1963 (aged 81); Isle of Wight, England
- Spouse: Eleanor May Brook (1913–1963)
- Children: Eleanor Damant; Mary Damant; Tommy Damant
- Parents: Henry Castell Damant; Mary née Wilson

Captain Guybon Chesney Castell Damant CBE (25 July 1881 – 29 June 1963) was a British royal navy officer known for his scientific research on preventing decompression illness with John Scott Haldane, his leadership over a team of divers that salvaged 44 tons of gold bullion from the wreck of HMS Laurentic between 1917 and 1924, and the covert work he and his divers performed by entering into sunken U-boats during World War I and recovering code books, ciphers, and other materials for the Naval Intelligence Division of the Royal Navy.

== Personal life ==
Damant was born on the Isle of Wight to Henry Castell Damant and Mary née Wilson. His father was a solicitor and the family was of upper class origins, dating back to ancestors in the former county of Alost (now Alst, in present-day Belgium) including Pieter Damant, the third bishop of Ghent, whose tomb can be found there in St Bravo Cathedral. Damant attended a boarding school called the Grange upon the Isle of Wight and later became a naval cadet aboard HMS Britannia. He married Eleanor May Brook on 23 July 1913 and had three children: Eleanor, Tommy, and Mary. Damant died on 29 June 1963 of colon cancer.

== Early career ==
After becoming a naval cadet in 1896 Damant served on a variety of stations before joining HMS Excellent with the intent of becoming a gunnery officer in 1905. During his training, he was given a basic course in diving since gunnery officers were placed in charge of the divers. Being an amateur natural scientist he was fascinated by the underwater world and devoted his career to diving. In 1906 he met John Scott Haldane who was commissioned by the Admiralty to find a way to prevent decompression sickness. Damant volunteered and was allowed to join Haldane as a researcher and experimental diver. This research led to the invention of staged decompression, which is still in use today. Damant as an experimental diver, achieved a world record in deep diving on 31 August 1906 while testing these decompression methods by achieving 210 feet (64 m) in Loch Striven. Haldane, Damant, and Arthur Edwin Boycott co-authored a paper that disseminated the new knowledge.

Damant was named inspector of diving in 1907 and worked on the salvage of several wrecks including HMS Gladiator (1908) and HMS Blackwater (1909). He retired from the Navy in 1911 as a Lieutenant Commander.

== World War I and the Laurentic gold salvage ==
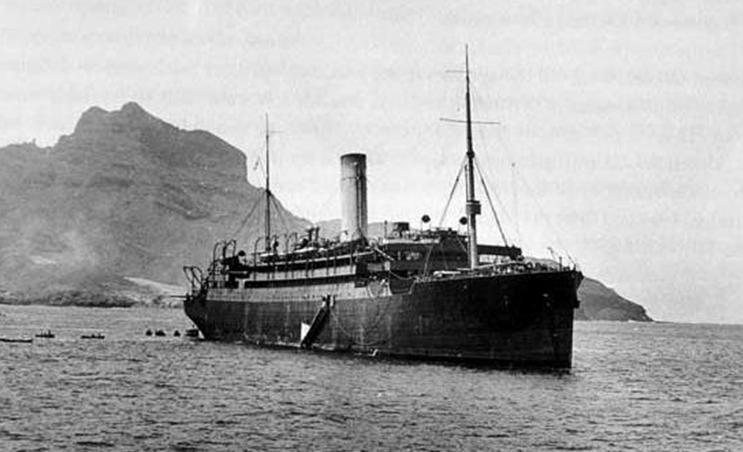
HMS Laurentic, which was sunk in 1917 carrying 44 tons of gold bars

At the outbreak of World War I, Damant was recalled from the retired list. He served at HMS Excellent as a staff officer until late January 1917 when the Admiralty ordered him to recover the 44 tons of gold bullion that sunk with the Laurentic off Lough Swilly on 25 January 1917. Using the mooring lighter, Volunteer, he and a crew of divers were successful at first and recovered four boxes of the gold.

Then late winter gales drove them off the site for a week. When they returned, the found Laurentic crushed by strong currents. Divers, who had been working inside the wreck, now excavated vertically until they came in touch with the gold again in June and continued salvage operations. By the time salvage was called off in September, Damant and his team had recovered 542 bars out of a total of 3,211 that had gone down with the ship.

In 1918, Damant was reassigned under the Naval Intelligence Division headed by Rear Admiral Reginald Hall to lead a team of covert divers to enter and remove intelligence materials from freshly sunken U-boats. The work took place mostly in the English Channel but took them as far afield as Scapa Flow. They dived on at least fifteen different wrecks, of which approximately seven provided valuable intelligence material. Damant's team, which later entered popular imagination as the so-called "Tin-Openers," materially contributed to the war effort.

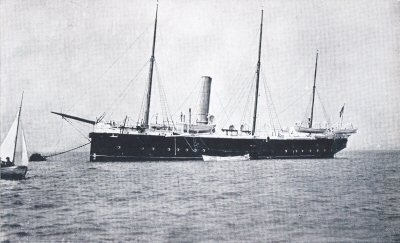
From 1919 to 1924 HMS Racer was the diving support vessel to salvage Laurentic's gold

In 1919, Damant and his divers returned to the Laurentic salvage, now using HMS Racer as their diving support vessel. They continued to work on the project until 1924. He and his team were highly successful, recovering all but 25 bars of gold. To date, the salvage is the largest recovery of sunken gold by weight in history.

== Subsequent career ==
Damant was made a CBE in the 1924 Birthday Honours and promoted to Captain on the retired list. He retired to Cowes on the Isle of Wight and continued to consult on deep sea diving and salvage matters until his death in 1963.

== See also ==
- Decompression (diving) – Pressure reduction and its effects during ascent from depth
- Laurentic – British ocean liner sunk by mines in 1917
