= Edward Inglefield =

Edward Inglefield may refer to:

- Edward Augustus Inglefield (1820–1894), Royal Naval officer
- Edward Fitzmaurice Inglefield (1861–1945), Royal Navy officer and secretary of Lloyd's of London
