= John Durnford =

Royal Navy Admiral (1849–1914)

Admiral Sir John Durnford GCB DSO
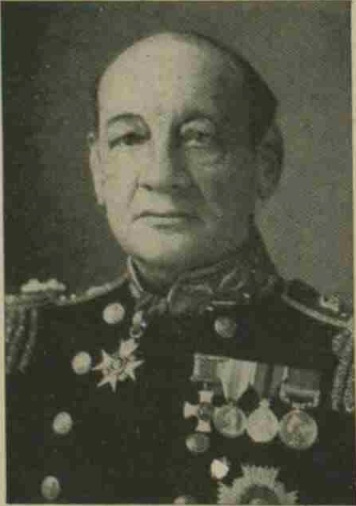
- Born: 6 February 1849
- Died: 13 June 1914 (aged 65)
- Military career
- Allegiance: United Kingdom
- Branch: Royal Navy
- Rank: Admiral
- Commands: HMS Mariner; HMS Defiance; HMS Hecla; HMS Vulcan; HMS Vernon; HMS Jupiter; Medway Dockyard Reserve; Fourth Sea Lord; Cape of Good Hope Station; Royal Naval College, Greenwich
- Conflicts: Third Anglo-Burmese War
- Awards: Knight Grand Cross of the Order of the Bath; Distinguished Service Order

Admiral Sir John Durnford, GCB, DSO (6 February 1849 – 13 June 1914) was a Royal Navy officer who went on to be Commander-in-Chief, Cape of Good Hope Station.

== Naval career ==
Educated at Eton College and the Royal Naval College, Dartmouth, Durnford joined the Royal Navy in 1862 and served in the Third Anglo-Burmese War of 1885 to 1886 for which he was mentioned in dispatches and awarded the DSO. Promoted to captain in 1888, he commanded the torpedo school HMS Vernon from 1895 to 1899. In October 1899 he was appointed in command of the pre-dreadnought battleship HMS Jupiter, serving in the Channel Fleet, and in December the following year he was appointed to Algiers for the Medway steam reserve.

Durnford became Junior Naval Lord in February 1901 and was promoted to rear-admiral on 1 January 1902. He served as Commander-in-Chief, Cape of Good Hope Station from 1904 to 1907. He was President of the Royal Naval College, Greenwich from 1908 to 1911 and retired in 1913.

He lived at Elmshurst in Fareham.

== Family ==
In 1881 he married Mary Louisa Eleanor Kirwan; they had one son and three daughters.

Military offices
Preceded by Sir Arthur Moore	Junior Naval Lord; 1901–1903	Succeeded by Sir Frederick Inglefield (As Fourth Sea Lord)
Preceded by Sir Arthur Moore	Commander-in-Chief, Cape of Good Hope Station; 1904–1907	Succeeded by Sir Edmund Poë
Preceded by Sir Arthur Fanshawe	President, Royal Naval College, Greenwich; 1908–1911	Succeeded by Sir Frederic Fisher
