= HMS Melita (1888) =

Sloop of the Royal Navy

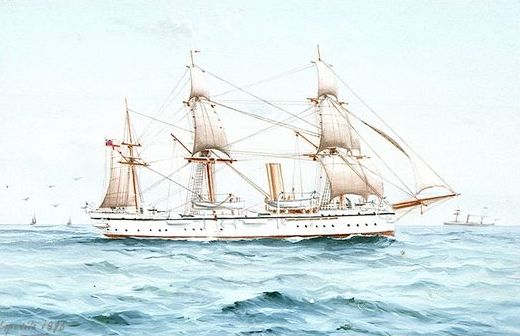
- Watercolour, 1896, by Gaetano Esposito

History

United Kingdom
- Name: HMS Melita
- Namesake: Malta (Latin)
- Builder: Malta Dockyard
- Cost: £60,179
- Laid down: 18 July 1883
- Launched: 20 March 1888
- Commissioned: 27 October 1892
- Renamed: Ringdove in December 1915
- Reclassified: salvage vessel 1915
- Fate: Sold on 9 July 1920 to the Falmouth Docks Company

United Kingdom
- Name: 1920: Ringdove's Aid; 1927: Restorer
- Operator: 1920: Falmouth Docks Company; 1921: Falmouth Docks & Engineering Company Ltd; 1927(?): Liverpool & Glasgow Salvage Association
- Identification: Official Number: 137212 (from 1921)
- Fate: Broken up in the second quarter of 1937

General characteristics
- Class & type: Mariner-class composite screw sloop
- Tonnage: 554 GRT, 214 NRT (from 1921)
- Displacement: 970 tons
- Length: 167 ft (51 m)
- Beam: 32 ft (9.8 m)
- Draught: 14 ft (4.3 m)
- Installed power: 850 ihp (630 kW)
- Propulsion: 2-cylinder horizontal compound-expansion steam engine; Single screw
- Sail plan: Barque-rigged
- Speed: 11 1/2 knots (21.3 km/h)
- Range: Approximately 2,100 nmi (3,900 km) at 10 kn (19 km/h)
- Complement: 126
- Armament: 8 × 5-inch 40cwt breech-loading guns (Note: The rest of the class had 38cwt versions); 1 × light gun; 8 × machine guns

HMS Melita was a Royal Navy Mariner-class composite screw sloop of 8 guns, launched in 1888 and commissioned in 1892. She was the only significant Royal Navy warship ever to be built in Malta Dockyard, (Note: Two 2-gun 94-ton schooners were also built by German of Malta in the 1850s) She was renamed HMS Ringdove in 1915 as a salvage vessel and in 1920 was sold to the Falmouth Docks Company, which changed her name to Ringdove's Aid. She was sold again in 1926 to the Liverpool & Glasgow Salvage Association, renamed Restorer, and finally broken up in 1937, 54 years after her keel was laid.

== Construction ==
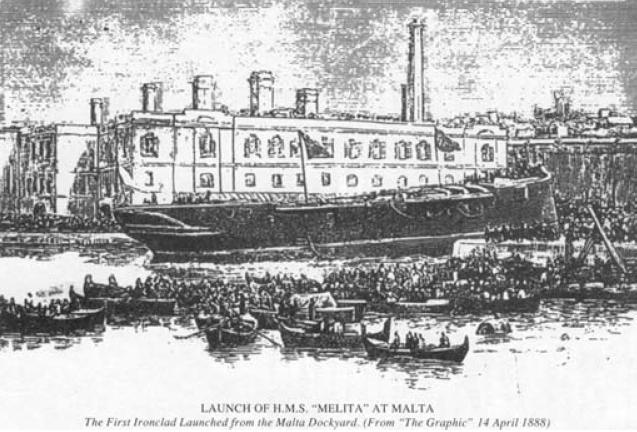
Launch of Melita

The last of six 8-gun Mariner-class gunvessels designed by Nathaniel Barnaby, the Royal Navy Director of Naval Construction, her hull was of composite construction; that is, iron keel, frames, stem and stern posts with wooden planking. She was fitted with a 2-cylinder horizontal compound expansion steam engine driving a single screw, which was also built in the Malta Dockyard. She was rigged with three masts, with square rig on the fore- and main-masts, making her a barque-rigged vessel. Her keel was laid at a special slipway built for her on the Senglea side of French Creek, which was still known as the "Melita Slip" into modern times. Although laid down on 18 July 1883, work progressed slowly; the entire enterprise had been designed to employ the local workforce when the Mediterranean Fleet was absent, and the fleet's frequent presence caused work on the new vessel to be halted all too often. She was launched as Melita, the Latin name for the Malta, on 20 March 1888 by Princess Victoria Melita, the twelve-year-old daughter of the Duke of Edinburgh who was Commander-in-Chief of the British Mediterranean Fleet. The Army and Navy Gazette reported that

The launch of the Melita, sloop at Malta Dockyard must have been quite an event in the history of the island. Under the circumstances, it would be invidious to make any remarks about the length of time she has been building. Let us hope she will prove a staunch and useful vessel.

By the time she was launched, her entire class had been re-classified from gunvessels to sloops

== Naval career ==
Melita was commissioned into the Royal Navy on 27 October 1892, nearly ten years after she was laid down. During the 1890s she served in the Mediterranean, recommissioning in October 1895, and again in October 1898. While serving in Melita during this period Lieutenant (later Rear Admiral) Edward Inglefield invented the Inglefield clip for quickly attaching flags to each other - they are still in use in the Royal Navy today. In 1896 she served off the Sudanese coast, as part of the preparations for the Anglo-Egyptian conquest of Sudan. While under Commander Ian M. Fraser she was as special service vessel at Constantinople when in November 1901 she was ordered to Devonport, where she arrived in late December to be paid off 17 January 1902.

Although it was stated by the Secretary to the Admiralty in Parliament that she would be sold, instead she became a boom defence vessel at Southampton in May 1905. She was converted to a salvage vessel in December 1915, and swapped names with the Redbreast-class gunboat Ringdove, thereby becoming the sixth Ringdove to serve in the Royal Navy.

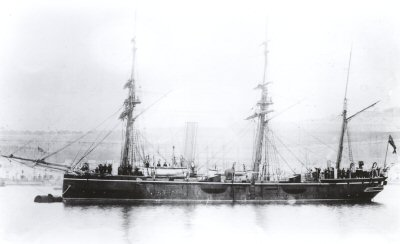
HMS Melita

== Civilian salvage vessel ==
Ringdove (ex-Melita) was sold to the Falmouth Docks Company on 9 July 1920, passing to Falmouth Docks & Engineering Company Ltd as Ringdove's Aid the following year. In 1923 she was fitted with a new engine made by Samuel White & Co. of East Cowes, Isle of Wight. This was a 2-cylinder compound steam engine of 1200 IHP, driving a new "washless" propeller.

The ship was sold in 1926 to the Liverpool & Glasgow Salvage Association, which renamed her Restorer in 1927.

Restorer was broken up in the second quarter of 1937.
