= SS Laurentic (1908) =

British ocean liner sunk by mines in 1917

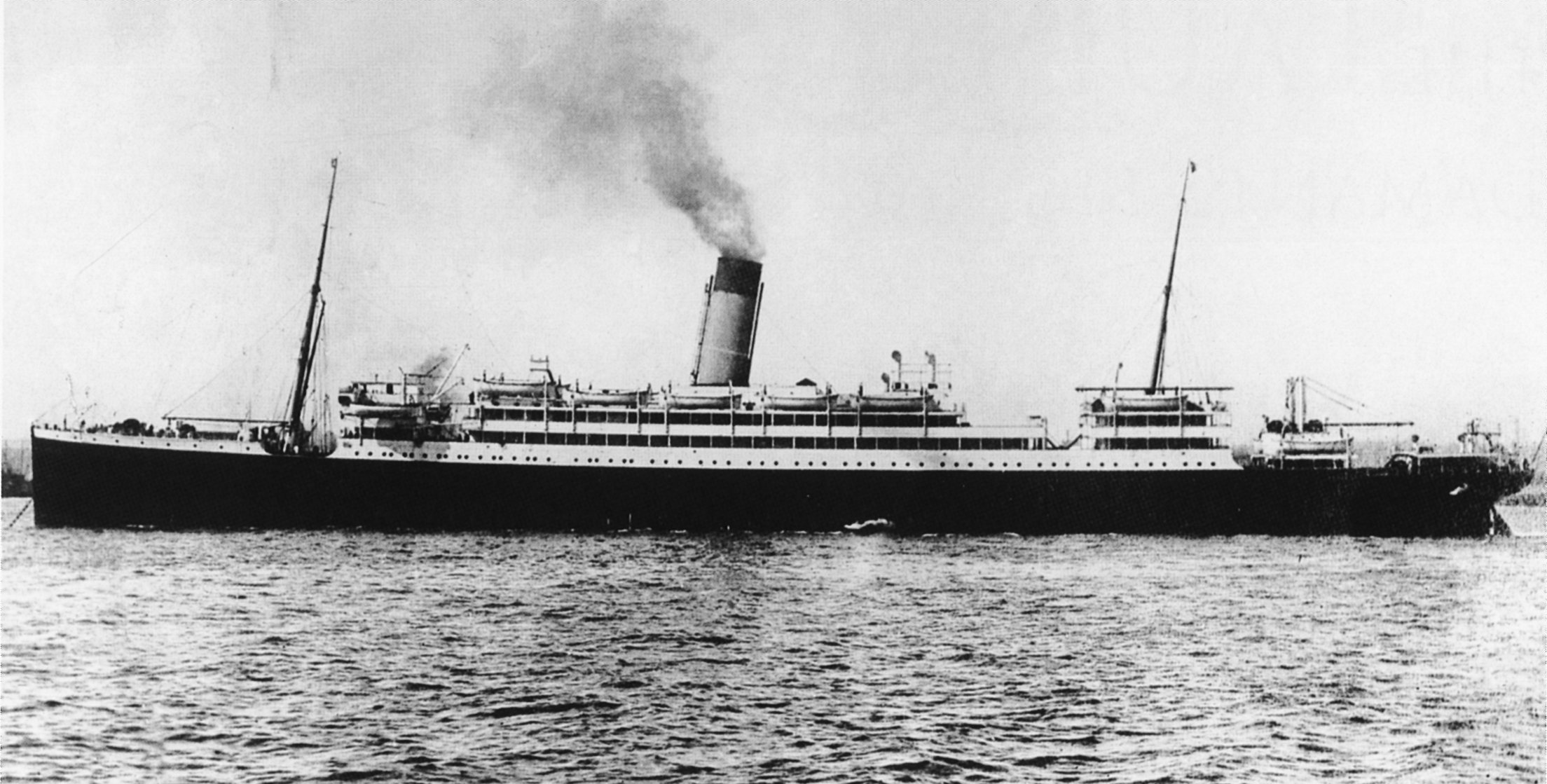
- Laurentic

History

United Kingdom
- Name: Laurentic
- Namesake: St. Lawrence River
- Owner: Ismay, Imrie & Co
- Operator: White Star Line 1909–14; (United Kingdom) Royal Navy 1914–17
- Port of registry: (United Kingdom) Liverpool
- Route: Liverpool – Quebec City – Montreal
- Ordered: 1907
- Builder: Harland & Wolff, Belfast
- Yard number: 394
- Launched: 10 September 1908
- Completed: 15 April 1909
- Commissioned: As AMC, 25 November 1914
- Maiden voyage: 29 April 1909
- Identification: UK official number 127959; Call sign MIC; Pennant number (as AMC) M71
- Fate: Sunk by mines 25 January 1917

General characteristics
- Type: Ocean liner
- Tonnage: 14,892 GRT, 9,255 NRT
- Length: 550.4 ft (167.8 m)
- Beam: 67.3 ft (20.5 m)
- Depth: 41.2 ft (12.6 m)
- Decks: 3
- Installed power: 1,492 NHP
- Propulsion: 2 × Triple-expansion steam engines; 1 × Low-pressure steam turbine; 3 × screw propellers
- Speed: 19.5 kn (36.1 km/h)
- Capacity: 230 1st class; 430 2nd class; 1,000 3rd class
- Crew: In civilian service: 387; as AMC: 470
- Armament: (as AMC): 8 × QF 6-inch naval guns; 2 × 6-pounder guns

SS Laurentic was a British transatlantic ocean liner built in Belfast, Ireland, and launched in 1908. She is an early example of a ship whose propulsion combined reciprocating steam engines with a low-pressure steam turbine.

Laurentic was ordered in 1907 with her sister ship Megantic by the Dominion Line but completed for the White Star Line. Her regular route was between Liverpool and Quebec City.

In 1914 Laurentic served briefly as a troop ship, and then served for more than two years as an armed merchant cruiser (AMC). As an AMC she saw service off West Africa, Singapore, the Bay of Bengal and the Far East.

In 1917 two German mines sank Laurentic off the northern coast of Ireland. Her crew successfully abandoned ship, but 354 of them died of hypothermia in her lifeboats. Laurentic was carrying about 43 tons of gold bars when she sank. Most of the 3,211 bars were salvaged by 1924; three more bars were found in the 1930s, while 22 remain unaccounted for. Laurentic's wreck is in the territorial waters of the Republic of Ireland and protected by Irish law.

== Background ==
Dominion Line ran a transatlantic liner service between Liverpool, Quebec, Montreal and Boston. In 1902 the International Mercantile Marine Company (IMM) took over Dominion Line.

In 1905 the rival Allan Line introduced the world's first steam turbine ocean liners. RMS Victorian and Virginian were two of the swiftest ships on the route between Britain and Canada, and at more than 10,600 GRT each they were also the largest. The pair made such an impression that Allan Line won a valuable Canadian Government mail contract before the ships were even launched.

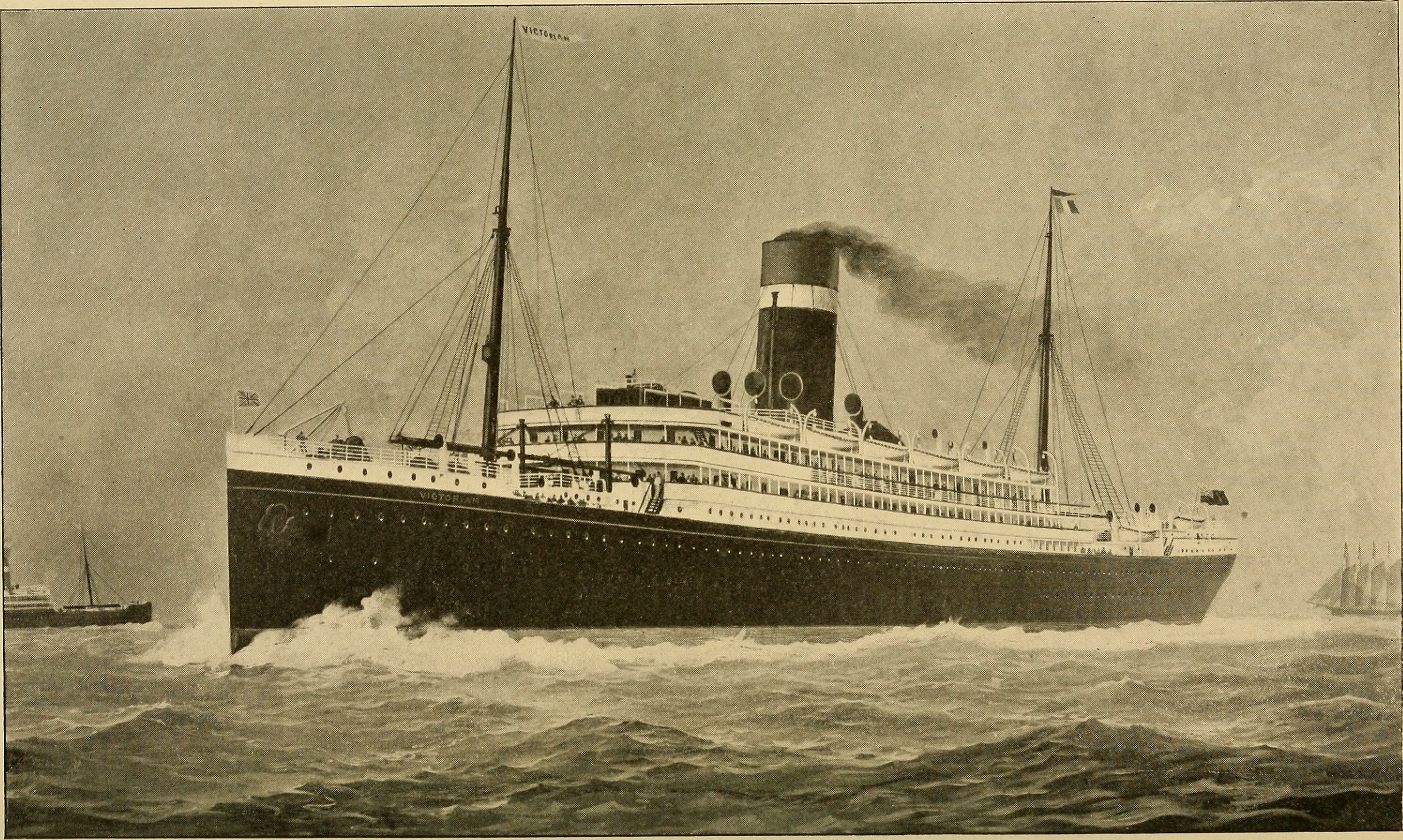
From 1905 Allan Line's Victorian and Virginian provided strong competition between Liverpool and Quebec

Like all of the earliest turbine ships, Victorian and Virginian had direct drive from their turbines to their screws. Virginian also acquired a reputation for rolling excessively in heavy seas. In addition, the earliest steam turbines used more bunker fuel than triple- or quadruple-expansion steam engines.

In 1907 Dominion Line responded by ordering a pair of liners from Harland & Wolff. At almost 15,000 GRT each they would be larger than Victorian and Virginian, the largest ships in Dominion Line's fleet, and the largest ships on the route between Britain and Canada.

Dominion Line planned to call the ships Alberta and Albany. But before the pair were completed, IMM transferred them to another of its subsidiaries, White Star Line, and they were renamed to conform with White Star naming policy. Alberta was launched on 10 September 1908 as Laurentic, and Albany was launched three months later as Megantic. Despite the change of owner, Laurentic and Megantic were still to serve the route between Liverpool and Montreal. They were White Star Line's first ships on the route.

== Combining reciprocating and turbine engines ==
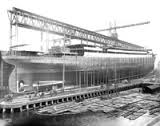
Laurentic being built on slipway 6 in Harland & Wolff's South Yard in Belfast

Megantic and Laurentic were used as a kind of full-scale experiment to test out a new form of engine arrangement: Megantic was built with a conventional arrangement of twin propellers driven by quadruple-expansion engines. Laurentic on the other hand was built with three screws, with a steam turbine driving her middle screw, and four-cylinder triple-expansion engines driving her port and starboard screws, the exhaust steam from their low-pressure cylinders drove the turbine.

Laurentic was not quite the first ship to have what came to be called "combination machinery". William Denny and Brothers launched the refrigerated cargo liner Otaki on 15 August 1908, less than a month before Laurentic, and completed her on 22 October, six months before Laurentic. However, Otaki lacked a sister ship for direct comparison. Laurentic and Megantic were identical sisters whose only significant difference was their engines. This enabled IMM and Harland & Wolff to compare the two systems directly.

Harland & Wolff built Laurentic on slipway number six of its South Yard in Belfast. She was completed on 15 April 1909 and Megantic followed on 3 June. When the performance of the two ships was evaluated, Laurentic was found to produce 20 percent more power than her sister for the same coal consumption. For the same power output, Laurentic's coal consumption was 12 to 15 percent less than Megantic's. This led IMM to specify a similar three-screw combination of two triple-expansion engines and one low-pressure turbine for the Olympic-class ocean liners that Harland & Wolff launched in 1910 and 1911.

== Passenger service ==
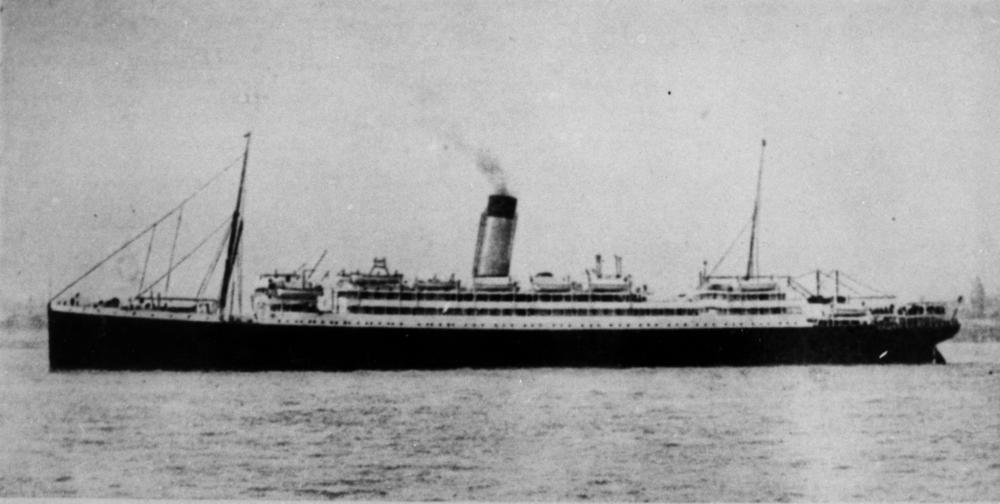
Laurentic in passenger service

The White Star and Dominion Lines provided two ships each to run a weekly joint service between Liverpool and Canada. The White Star ships were Laurentic and Megantic. The Dominion Line ships were the 10,000 GRT Canada and 7,000 GRT Dominion.

Laurentic carried 387 crew and had berths for 1,660 passengers: 230 first class, 430 second class and 1,000 third class. On her maiden voyage Laurentic left Liverpool on 29 April 1909 and reached both Quebec and Montreal on 7 May. In her five years of civilian service, Laurentic took thousands of emigrants from the UK to Canada.

In winter Laurentic also served New York City. On a westbound crossing to New York on 22 January 1910 a storm hit Laurentic that broke portholes on her upper deck, flooded her bridge and officers' quarters and disabled her engine order telegraphs.

Laurentic also made winter cruises to the Mediterranean Sea and the West Indies.

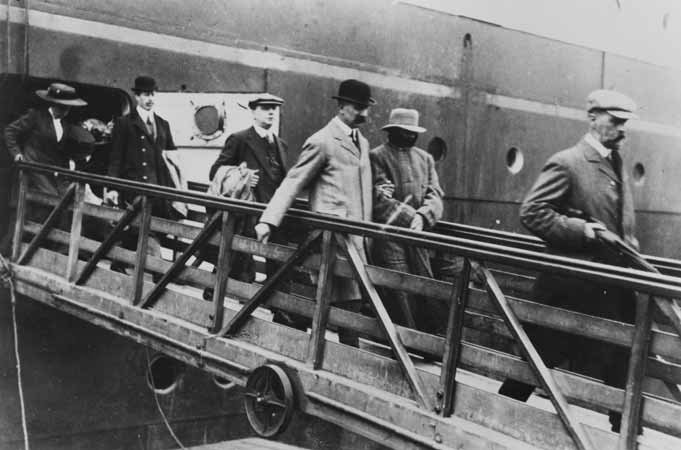
DCI Walter Dew (centre, in bowler hat) leading murder suspect HH Crippen ashore from Megantic in 1910

In July 1910 Metropolitan Police DCI Walter Dew used Laurentic's speed to reach Rimouski, Quebec ahead of murder suspect Hawley Harvey Crippen and his lover Ethel Le Neve, who were travelling aboard the Canadian Pacific liner Montrose. Dew boarded Montrose, arrested Crippen and Le Neve, and repatriated them aboard Megantic.

In 1911 Laurentic set a westbound record time for the route of 13 days and four hours from Liverpool to Montreal.

By 1912 Laurentic was equipped for wireless telegraphy, operating on the 300 and 600 metre wavelengths. Her call sign was MIC. On a westbound crossing that year she passed where RMS Titanic had sunk on 15 April. Laurentic's Master, John Mathias, reported by wireless on 21 April "that he had kept a careful lookout while passing over the Grand Banks, and had seen neither bodies nor wreckage".

On 13 September 1914 Laurentic was requisitioned at Montreal to be a troop ship. She loaded 15,000 sacks of flour and embarked the 1st Battalion, The Royal Canadian Dragoons. On 3 October she left Gaspé Bay as one of a convoy of 32 ships bringing more than 30,000 members of the Canadian Expeditionary Force to Europe. She reached Plymouth on 14 October.

== Armed Merchant Cruiser ==
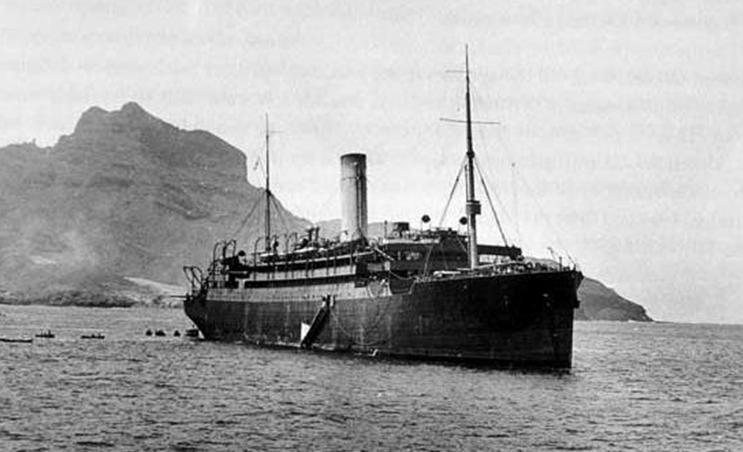
Laurentic as an AMC

The Admiralty then had Laurentic converted into an AMC. She was armed with eight QF 6-inch naval guns and two 6-pounder guns. On 25 November 1914 she was commissioned as HMS Laurentic, with the pennant number M 71.

In December 1914 Laurentic sailed from Liverpool via Sierra Leone and Lagos to Kamerun, where she assisted in the Kamerun campaign. In September the Royal Navy had captured several German merchant ships that had sought refuge in the Wouri estuary. On 26–30 December Laurentic discharged prize crews from five of the captured ships.

In January 1915 Laurentic returned via Lagos, Accra, Sekondi and Sierra Leone to Birkenhead. In Accra and Sekondi she embarked German civilian internees.

In February 1915 Laurentic sailed to Gibraltar. She then patrolled to São Vicente, Sierra Leone and Kamerun until at least April. By July she was in the Indian Ocean off Mozambique heading for Durban, where she called on 2–4 August. She then crossed the Indian Ocean, coaling at Colombo in Ceylon on 18–19 August and reached Singapore on 25 August.

From September 1915 to January 1916 Laurentic patrolled the Bay of Bengal, visiting Port Blair, the Hooghly River, the coast of Balasore and Rangoon. On 30–31 January she called at Singapore before sailing for Hong Kong.

On 5 February Laurentic stopped the Japanese merchant ship Tenyo Maru off the Philippines and sent a boarding party aboard. They arrested nine Indian nationals "travelling without bonafides of any description", who were suspected of being Hindu nationalists. Japanese newspapers claimed that the action violated international law. The Japanese Minister for Foreign Affairs, Ishii Kikujirō, said that the Japanese Government was investigating.

On 22 February Laurentic reached Hong Kong. She patrolled Chinese waters until 15 March, then spent a week in Hong Kong before returning to Singapore, where she arrived on 30 March.

In April 1916 Laurentic returned to Hong Kong, where she was refitted from 24 April to 2 June. She then returned to Singapore, made a brief patrol to Penang and back and on 28 June left Singapore for South Africa.

=== Two gold shipments to Canada ===
Laurentic called at Simon's Town 17–19 July, bunkered in Cape Town on 20 July and then on 23–24 July loaded bullion to take to Canada.

Laurentic left Cape Town on 25 July 1916, reached Halifax, Nova Scotia on 15 August and discharged her cargo of bullion. She spent September and the first half of October patrolling the east coast of Canada and then south to Bermuda, where she spent 14–27 October in port and loaded specie. By 30 October she was back in Halifax, where she unloaded the specie and spent four weeks in port before leaving on 27 November for Liverpool.

On 1 December it was discovered that coal in Laurentic's number two hold was on fire. Her crew started to remove coal from the bunker. A dislodged beam struck Commander Mathias, fracturing his skull. On 2 December the crew finished removing coal from the hold and threw 150 tons of charred coal overboard. On 4 December Cdr Mathias died of his injury. Laurentic reached Birkenhead on 6 December.

== Loss ==
Laurentic's logbook records that on 23 December in Birkenhead she again loaded specie. This may refer to the 3,211 gold bars that she was secretly to carry to buy munitions from Canada and the USA. At the time they were worth £5 million.

On 23 January 1917 she left Birkenhead. On the morning of 25 January she called at Buncrana in Lough Swilly to disembark four ratings with symptoms of yellow fever.

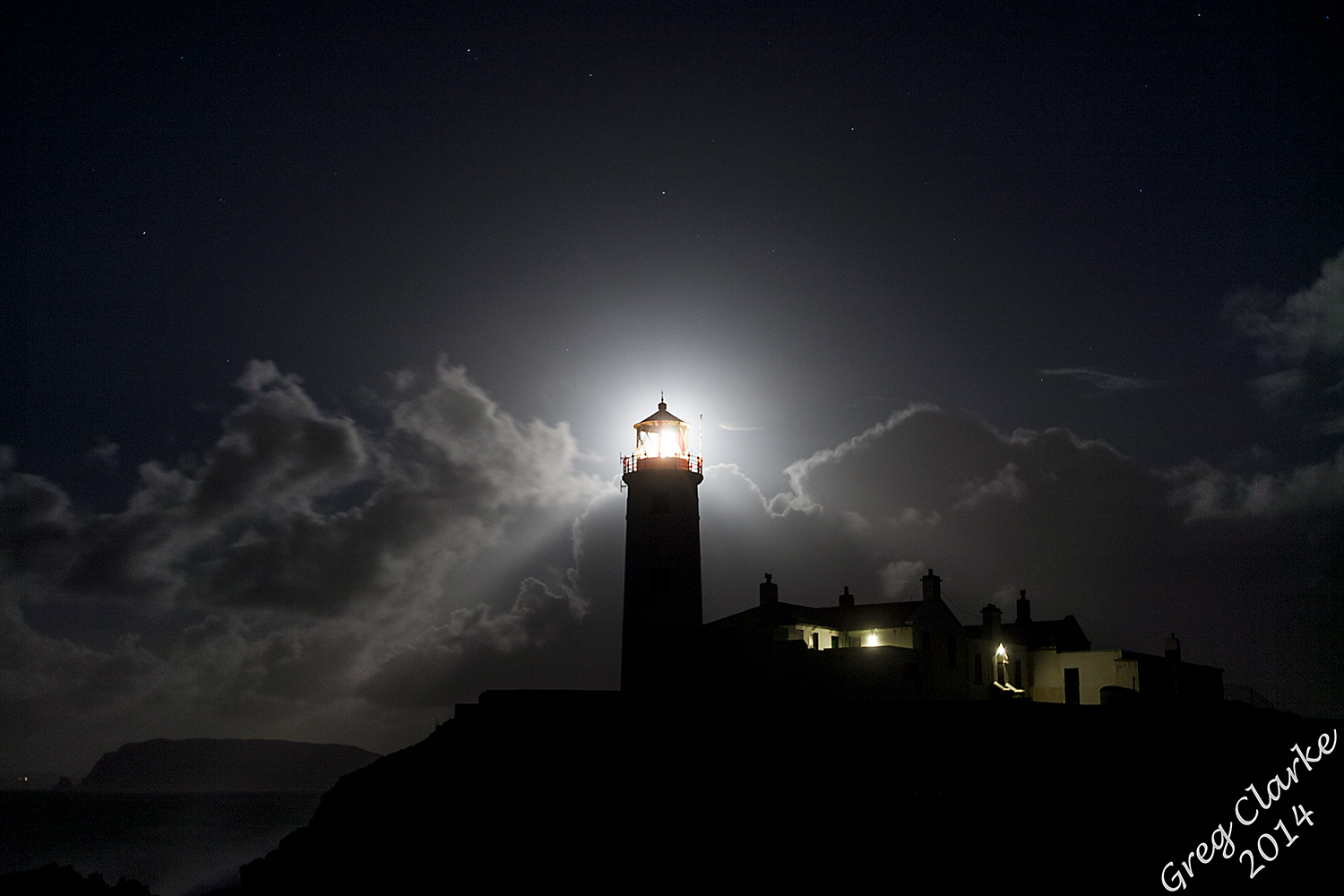
Fanad Head Lighthouse by moonlight

At 1700 hrs Laurentic left Buncrana in a bitterly cold blizzard. There were reports that a U-boat had been sighted near the mouth of Lough Swilly. Laurentic was due to rendezvous with a destroyer escort off Fanad Head, but her commander, Captain Reginald Norton, chose to proceed without it.

At 1755 hrs, just north of the lough, Laurentic struck a mine that had been laid by SM U-80. It exploded abreast of Laurentic's foremast. 20 seconds later a second mine exploded abreast of her engine room, which disabled her dynamo and pumps. The crew was unable to transmit a wireless distress message, but fired a distress rocket. Both explosions were on her port side, to which she soon listed 20 degrees, making it hard to launch her lifeboats.

=== Abandoning ship ===
Despite the difficult conditions Laurentic's crew launched lifeboats and tried to row ashore, guided by Fanad Head Lighthouse. But the temperature dropped as low as −13 °C (9 °F), and many men in the lifeboats died of hypothermia before reaching the shore. Local fishing boats rescued the exhausted and very cold survivors.

About 45 minutes after the explosion Captain Norton, using an electric torch, searched the ship for survivors. He then boarded a lifeboat, and was the last to leave his ship. He stated:

To the best of my knowledge, all the men got safely into the boats. The best of order prevailed after the explosion. The officers and men lived up to the best traditions of the navy...The deaths were all due to exposure, owing to the coldness of the night. My own boat was almost full of water when we were picked up by a trawler the next morning, but all the men in the boat survived. Another boat, picked up at 3 o'clock in the afternoon, contained five survivors and fifteen frozen bodies. They had been exposed to the bitter cold for over twenty hours.

Another boat, found 20 hours after the sinking, contained 17 men dead from hypothermia. In total 354 men were killed and 121 survived: 12 officers and 109 ratings. The survivors were given a civic reception in the Guildhall, Derry, where each man was given a ten-shilling note and a packet of cigarettes.

=== Burials and monuments ===
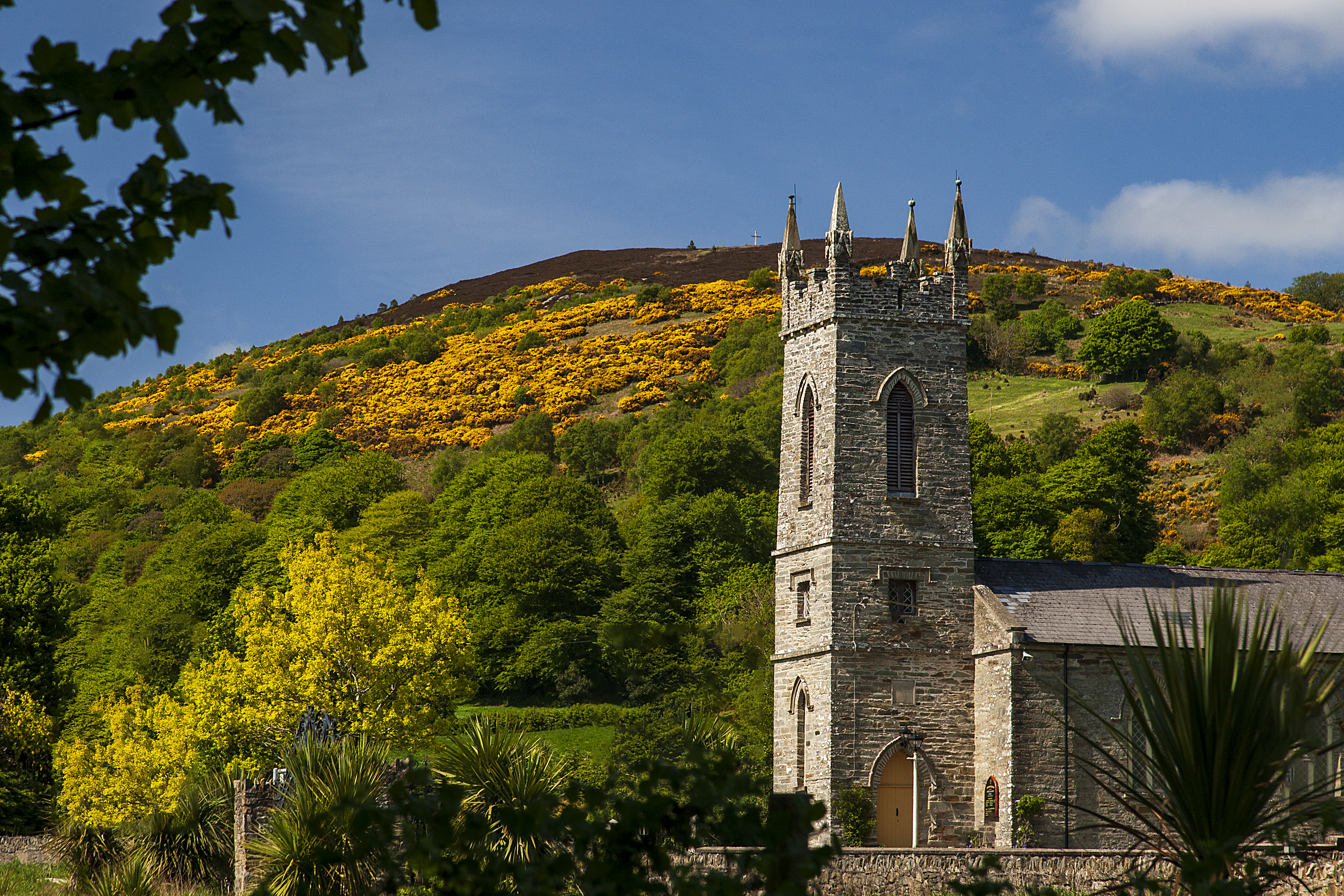
St Mura's parish church, Fahan, where 71 of the dead are buried in a mass grave

In the following weeks corpses were washed ashore. 71 of the dead are buried in a mass grave in St Mura's parish churchyard, Fahan. One is buried at Buncrana. One washed ashore on Heisker in the Outer Hebrides, 150 miles away, and is buried there.

A few of the dead are buried elsewhere to be near their families or place of birth, including Holywood and Tullylish in County Down, Arklow in County Wicklow and West Derby in Liverpool.

Many of the dead have no grave but the sea. They are commemorated on Royal Navy monuments at Chatham, Plymouth and Portsmouth.

== Gold salvage ==
The gold bullion had been stowed in Laurentic's second class baggage room. A crew of Royal Navy salvage divers was deployed to try to recover it. It was led by Captain Guybon Damant, who was a specialist in deep-water diving. The crew included Laurentic's own diver, P/O Augustus Dent, who had survived the sinking. They found the wreck at a depth of 120 ft (37 m), listing 60 degrees to port.

Initially the wreck was intact. Damant and his team used guncotton to blow open a watertight door called the "entry port" mid-way down the ship's side, and an iron gate in the companionway leading to the baggage room. A diver called EC Miller used a hammer and chisel to open the baggage room door.

Each box of gold was only one foot by one foot by six inches (600 × 600 × 300 mm) but weighed 140 lb (64 kg). The weight, and the awkward angle of the wreck, made it hard to move each box to the entry port to be hoisted to the surface. In two days Miller managed to retrieve four boxes, each worth about £8,000. After the fourth box was raised a gale began which forced Damant to suspend work.

The gale lasted a week. When the divers returned they found the wreck crushed. The entry port had been 60 ft (18 m) below the surface but was now 103 ft (31 m) below. The companionway to the baggage room was squashed, with its ceiling now only 18 in (460 mm) above its floor. Divers used explosives to force the ceiling back up, and they then shored it up. But when they reached the baggage room they found its floor torn open and the gold gone.

=== Digging a shaft through the wreck ===
The wreck was noisy, indicating that parts of it were still moving. The companionway was beneath five decks and at risk of collapse. Damant abandoned this access route and directed his crew to use explosives to remove the mainmast and make a vertical shaft down through the wreck to where he expected the gold now to be.

The work was dangerous, and further complicated by Royal Navy minesweepers in the area occasionally detonating German mines that they found. After one mine was detonated only 2 nmi (4 km) away Damant suspended diving whenever minesweepers were within 5 nmi (9 km) of the wreck. Even so, a mine detonated 6 nmi (11 km) away gave one of the divers what Damant called "a severe blow".

After two months Damant's crew completed their shaft and one part of the gold. Damant believed that by this stage the gold had become separated into two parts. As the wreck had moved and deteriorated, some of the boxes had broken open, and Miller found 10 bars loose. By September the weather was worsening and Damant suspended work again. Their total haul for 1917 was 542 bars, which at the time were worth £800,000.

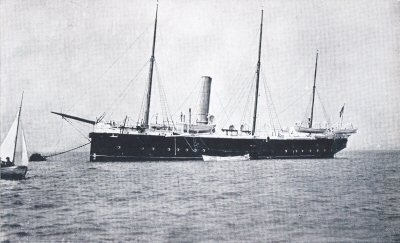
In 1919–24 HMS Racer was a diving support vessel to salvage Laurentic's gold

In 1918 Damant and his divers were on other duties, but in 1919 they resumed work on Laurentic. From then on they used HMS Racer, which was a more suitable diving support vessel. As the season progressed the gold proved harder to find, but their total haul for 1919 was 315 bars worth a total of £470,000.

In the winter of 1919–20 parts of the ship's superstructure either side of the work site collapsed, filling the hole that the divers had made in 1917 and 1919. The current and tides had also swept in stone and sand from the seabed, which now silted up the wreckage.

=== Searching bare-handed for gold ===
In 1920 Damant and his crew tried centrifugal pumps and dredging grabs, but the space was too constricted and the periods in which they could be used were too short for them to be effective. In fine weather divers worked by hand, and in bad weather the sand filled what they had cleared. In the summer of 1920 they retrieved only seven gold bars, but in the summer of 1921 they cleared many hundreds of tons of the wreck's structure and retrieved another 43 bars.

In the winter of 1921–22 the currents washed away some of the débris, and in the spring of 1922 the first diver to descend found gold bars protruding from the sand within the wreck. The bars were now spread within an area of the wreck, but the weather allowed the diving crew to work from April until October and retrieve 895 bars worth £1.5 million. On one day divers found a cluster of bars worth £150,000 in the remains of their boxes.

Most of the bars were buried in 18 to 24 in (460 to 610 mm) of sand, silt or mud. The divers would use a fire hose lowered from Racer to loosen the silt, although this reduced visibility to almost nil. They wore standard diving dress but chose to work bare-handed, using improvised scoops to dig and thrusting their hands into the loosened silt and recognising gold bars by touch by their fingertips. They wore their fingertips raw and suffered pain every night after work. But the method was effective, and in 1923 they retrieved 1,255 bars worth nearly £2 million. Each diver was paid a bounty of a half crown for each £100 of gold recovered.

When Racer returned to the wreck site in the spring of 1924, Damant's divers found that the winter currents had cleared most of the sand from the bottom of the hull where they had been working, there was no sign of the gold, but there were holes torn in the steel plating on which the gold had been resting.

They found some bars by reaching through the holes, digging under the plates and eventually crawling under them. Damant then prescribed the laborious but safer method of removing about 2,000 sq ft (190 m^{2}) of steel plates to expose the seabed beneath. The divers' total haul for 1924 was 129 gold bars before the onset of winter weather forced them to stop.

Damant's divers retrieved a total of 3,186 of the 3,211 gold bars. The total cost of salvage work from 1917 to 1924 was £128,000, or two or three percent of the value of gold retrieved, and only 25 gold bars were still missing. The salvage is the largest recovery of sunken gold by weight in history.

In June 1924 Damant was made a CBE, and that December members of the diving crew including P/Os Balson, Dent and Light were awarded the Medal of the Order of the British Empire.

=== Private salvage attempts ===
In the 1930s a British private company took over where the Royal Navy had left off, but found only three more gold bars. In the 1950s salvagers dug a trench in the seabed 40 ft (12 m) long and 18 ft (5.5 m) deep but found no gold. In the 1960s two brothers called Ray and Eric Cossum bought the salvage rights. In the 1980s a Dutch company searched for the gold but found none.

== Other salvage ==
Damant's Royal Navy divers recovered Laurentic's two bells. In 1924 Damant presented the bell from her bow to All Saints' parish church, Portsalon, County Donegal, the port from which Racer and her salvage crew operated. It still hangs in the church's bell-turret.

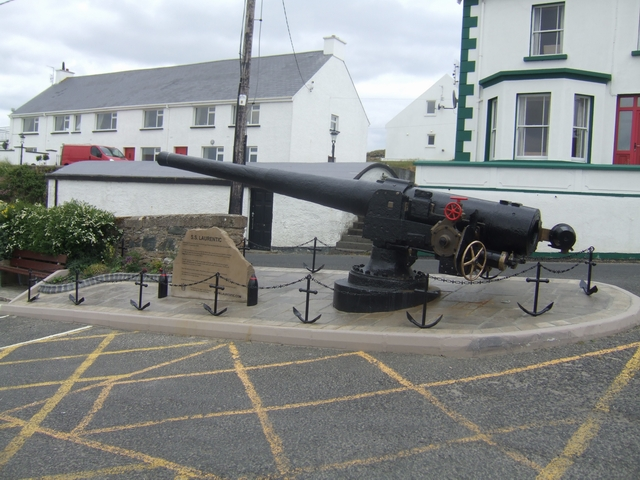
One of Laurentic's 6-inch guns in Downings

In 2018 Derry City and Strabane District Council bought the bell from her bridge at an auction and exhibited it in Derry Guildhall. The council then loaned the bell to the Titanic Hotel in Belfast on temporary display, and planned to display the bell permanently in Derry's planned Maritime Museum. However, in 2018 it was reported that the collapse of the Northern Ireland Executive in 2017 had stalled plans for the museum.

In 2007 a team of divers from Sheephaven Bay recovered one of Laurentic's guns with help from a local fishing boat. It is now displayed at the pier in Downings, County Donegal.

== Wreck ==
Laurentic's wreck is between Fanad and Malin Head at 55°18′13″N 07°35′27″W at a depth of 98 to 131 ft (30 to 40 m). Ray Cossum still owns the salvage rights.

Being in the territorial waters of the Republic of Ireland and more than a century old, the wreck is automatically protected by the National Monuments (Amendment) Act, 1987, section 3, sub-section (4). Divers must obtain a licence from the Department of Tourism, Culture, Arts, Gaeltacht, Sport and Media before diving on the wreck.

The wreck is much broken up by years of salvage work and more than a century of strong currents. But large parts, such as her Scotch boilers, are still recognisable.

== Bibliography ==
- Anderson, Roy (1964). White Star. T Stephenson & Sons Ltd.
- Armstrong, R, ed. (1969). Treasure and Treasure Hunters. London: Hamish Hamilton. ISBN 0241017475.
- Damant, GCC (1926). "Notes on the "Laurentic" Salvage Operations and the Prevention of Compressed Air Illness". The Journal of Hygiene. 25 (1): 26–49. doi:10.1017/s0022172400017198. JSTOR 3859567. PMC 2167577. PMID 20474875.
- De Kerbrech, Richard (2009). Ships of the White Star Line. Shepperton: Ian Allan Publishing. ISBN 978-0-7110-3366-5.
- Dowling, R (1909) [1903]. All About Ships & Shipping (2nd ed.). London: Alexander Moring Ltd.
- The Marconi Press Agency Ltd (1913). The Year Book of Wireless Telegraphy and Telephony. London: The St Katherine Press.
- Osborne, Richard; Spong, Harry; Grover, Tom (2007). Armed Merchant Cruisers 1878–1945. Windsor: World Warship Society. ISBN 978-0-9543310-8-5.
- Williams, Joseph (2017). The sunken gold: a story of World War I espionage and the greatest treasure salvage in history. Chicago: Chicago Review Press. ISBN 978-1613737583. OCLC 971129653.
