= HMS Racer (1884) =

Sloop of the Royal Navy

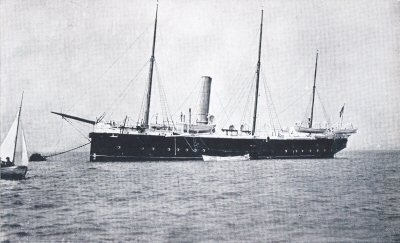
- HMS Racer

History

United Kingdom
- Name: HMS Racer
- Builder: Devonport Dockyard
- Cost: Hull: £37,000, Machinery: £12,000
- Laid down: 9 April 1883
- Launched: 6 August 1884
- Commissioned: 9 April 1885
- Fate: Sold for scrap on 6 November 1928

General characteristics
- Class & type: Mariner-class composite screw sloop
- Displacement: 970 tons
- Length: 167 ft (51 m)
- Beam: 32 ft (9.8 m)
- Draught: 14 ft (4.3 m)
- Installed power: 850 ihp (630 kW)
- Propulsion: 2-cylinder horizontal compound steam engine; Single screw
- Sail plan: Barque-rigged
- Speed: 11 1/2 knots (21.3 km/h)
- Range: About 2,100 nmi (3,900 km) at 10 kn (19 km/h)
- Complement: 126
- Armament: 8 × 5-inch 38cwt breech-loading guns; 1 × light gun; 8 × machine guns

HMS Racer was a Royal Navy Mariner-class composite screw gunvessel of 8 guns.

== Building ==
Designed by Nathaniel Barnaby, the Royal Navy Director of Naval Construction, her hull was of composite construction; that is, iron keel, frames, stem and stern posts with wooden planking. She was fitted with a 2-cylinder horizontal compound-expansion steam engine driving a single propeller, produced by Hawthorn Leslie. She was rigged with three masts, with square rig on the fore- and main-masts, making her a barque-rigged vessel.

Her keel was laid at Devonport Royal Dockyard on 9 April 1883 and she was launched on 6 August 1884. Her entire class were re-classified in November 1884 as sloops before they entered service.

== Career ==
Racer was commissioned into the Royal Navy on 9 April 1885. She served in Sierra Leone in 1886 and in the Gambia in early 1891, again in Sierra Leone in April 1891 against Tambi and then immediately afterwards in the Gambia against Toniataba. She became a tender to the training ship HMS Britannia at Dartmouth, Devon in 1896. She was present at the Fleet Review at Spithead in celebration of the Diamond Jubilee on 26 June 1897.

When Royal Navy officer training moved to Royal Naval College, Osborne, near Cowes, in 1903, Racer became a tender to the new establishment. Officers were shown to be attached to the vessel.

In 1916–17 Racer was rebuilt as a salvage vessel, being given the starboard machinery of Torpedo Boat 8, as well as two 17-ton derricks and submersible electric, steam centrifugal and compressed air pumps capable of pumping 3,000 tonnes (3 million litres) of water per hour.

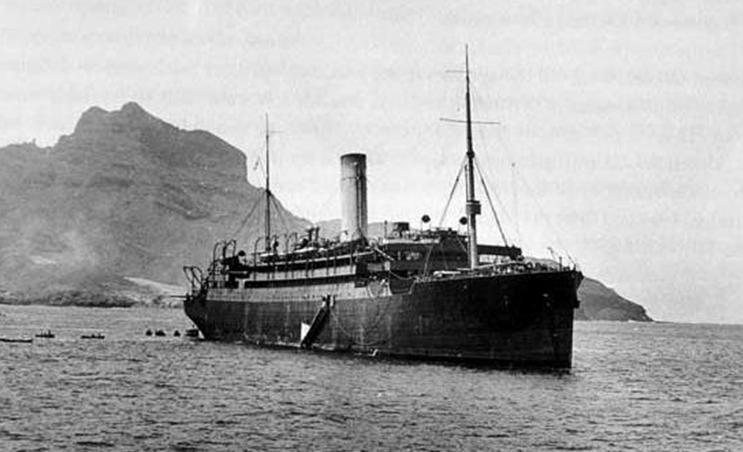
HMS Laurentic, from whose sunken wreck Racer helped to retrieve 43 tons of gold bars

Each summer from 1920 to 1924 Racer was the diving support vessel to recover gold bars from HMS Laurentic, which had been sunk by German mines at the mouth of Lough Swilly in 1917. Her derricks also raised many hundreds of tons of wreckage and sand from Laurentic that divers removed to reach the gold. Her divers recovered 3,186 of the 3,211 gold bars.

== Disposal ==
Racer was sold for scrap to Hughes Bolckow of Blyth, Northumberland on 6 November 1928.

== Bibliography ==
- Colledge, J. J.; Warlow, Ben (2006) [1969]. Ships of the Royal Navy: The Complete Record of All Fighting Ships of the Royal Navy from the 15th Century to the Present (3rd Rev ed.). London: Chatham Publishing. ISBN 978-1-86176-281-8. OCLC 67375475.
- Dodson, Aidan (2026). "The Cadet Training Ships of the Royal Navy". In Jordan, John (ed.). Warship 2026. Osprey Publishing. pp. 156–174. ISBN 978-1-4728-7259-3.
