= Liverpool & Glasgow Salvage Association =

The Liverpool & Glasgow Salvage Association was formed on 1 January 1924 from the merger of the Liverpool Salvage Association and the Glasgow Salvage Association.

The Association can trace its origins back to 1857 with the creation of the Liverpool Salvage Association and the Glasgow Salvage Association.

== Liverpool Salvage Association ==
The Liverpool Salvage Association was established in 1857 by a Committee of Liverpool-based shipowners, merchants, and underwriters. Famous names form the world of shipping including Holt, Brocklebank and Papayanni were included in the list of founders. Their objective was to promote dispatch and economy in the salving of ships and their cargoes. Experts were employed by the Committee who traveled across the globe to reach casualties and protect the interests of those concerned. In 1887, the Liverpool committee was incorporated as the Liverpool Association for the Protection of Commercial Interests as respects Wrecked and Damaged Property.

== Glasgow Salvage Association ==
In 1857, the Association of Underwriters & Insurance Brokers in Glasgow, Scotland, formed the Glasgow Underwriters' Committee for the Protection of Commercial Interests as Respects Wrecked & Damaged Property. The Glasgow Association operated the salvage steamer Rescue and employing its own salvage officers. In 1858 it purchased a second salvage steamer, Glowworm. In 1887, the Glasgow committee was incorporated as the Glasgow Association for the Protection of Commercial Interests as respects Wrecked and Damaged Property. As with the Liverpool Association, its objects were to protect the interests of owners and underwriters by promoting despatch and economy in the salvage of ships and their cargoes and it was managed by a committee who employed a staff of surveyors and wreck agents. In 1895 it changed its name to the Glasgow Salvage Association.

A similar salvage association already existed in London and information on casualties was shared between the associations.

== Merger ==
On 1 January 1924 the Liverpool Salvage Association and the Glasgow Salvage Association merged to form the Liverpool & Glasgow Salvage Association.

Although the two Associations worked closely with each other they retained separate offices and sent nominated representatives to meetings.

== Salvaging activities during World War 1 and World War 2 ==
As well as undertaking 'routine' peacetime salvage work, the Liverpool & Glasgow Salvage Association formed the backbone of British salvage efforts during both First and Second World Wars; its plant, personnel and ships being seconded to naval use on both occasions. Captain Frederick Young, later Sir Frederick, rose to command the Admiralty's Salvage Section during World War I, with the honorary rank of Commodore. Sir Frederick was, amongst many other things, a formidable diver as well as a respected marine engineer.

The wartime salvage activities of the Liverpool & Glasgow Salvage Association is symbolised by the bell from HMS Thetis, which is now on display in the Merseyside Maritime Museum. The Association was commissioned to salvage the submarine which sank in 1939 during trials in Liverpool Bay. The inscribed bell was presented to the Liverpool & Glasgow Salvage Association by the British Admiralty to commemorate a successful salvage operation.

== Salvage vessels ==
The following are some of the salvage vessels operation by the Liverpool & Glasgow Salvage Association.

- Rescue
- Glowworm
- Ranger
- Salveda
- Salvage Chieftain
- LC14 Dumb lifting craft
- LC20 Dumb lifting craft
- Enterprise No. 118083 Liverpool Salvage Association 1910

Ranger assisted in the salvage of the SS Suevic which had run aground on Stag Rock near the Lizard on 17 March 1901.

Ranger was responsible for the successful salvage of HMS Gladiator following the warships collision with the American mail steamer S.S. St. Paul on 25 April 1908 during which the warship foundered off the Isle of Wight. Captain Frederick Young led the successful salvage operation - this was commemorated as part of a series of John Player & Sons cigarette cards.

== Recent history ==
In 1946 all operations were transferred to Liverpool.

Salvaging using the Associations own salvage ships was suspended in 1968 as international trading conditions and improved navigational aids made it uneconomical; today, the Liverpool & Glasgow Salvage Association continues to offer technical expertise for salvage operations.

== LGSA Marine ==
The Liverpool & Glasgow Salvage Association acquired Perfect Lambert & Co in 2000 and now trades as LGSA Marine.

LGSA Marine is the trading name for The Liverpool and Glasgow Association For the Protection of Commercial Interests As Respects Wrecked & Damaged Property Limited.

The Liverpool & Glasgow Salvage Association remains as a not-for-profit business operating for the benefit of the marine & insurance industry.
