= HMS Mariner (1884) =

Royal Navy Mariner-class composite screw gunvessel of 8 guns

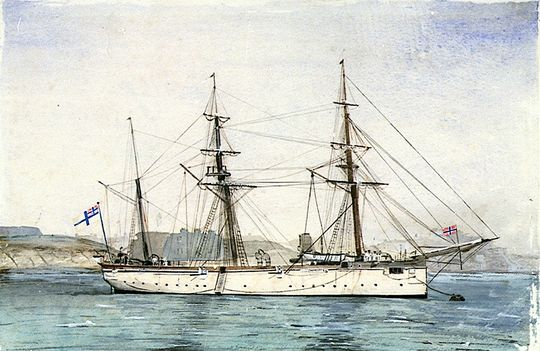
- HMS Mariner by an unknown artist

History

United Kingdom
- Name: HMS Mariner
- Builder: Devonport Dockyard
- Cost: Hull: £37,156, Machinery £12,841
- Laid down: 8 January 1883
- Launched: 23 June 1884
- Commissioned: 19 March 1885
- Fate: Lent to the Liverpool Salvage Association in 1917; Laid up 1922 to 1929; Sold on 19 February 1929

General characteristics
- Type: Mariner-class composite screw sloop
- Displacement: 970 tons
- Length: 167 ft (51 m)
- Beam: 32 ft (9.8 m)
- Draught: 14 ft (4.3 m)
- Installed power: 850 ihp (630 kW)
- Propulsion: 2-cylinder horizontal compound expansion steam engine; Single screw
- Sail plan: Barque-rigged
- Speed: 11 1/2 knots (21.3 km/h)
- Range: Approximately 2,100 nmi (3,900 km) at 10 kn (19 km/h)
- Complement: 126
- Armament: 8 × 5-inch 38cwt breech-loading guns; 1 × light gun; 8 × machine guns

HMS Mariner was the name-ship of the Royal Navy Mariner-class composite screw gunvessel of 8 guns.

== Construction ==
Designed by Nathaniel Barnaby, the Royal Navy Director of Naval Construction, her hull was of composite construction; that is, iron keel, frames, stem and stern posts with wooden planking. She was fitted with a 2-cylinder horizontal compound expansion steam engine driving a single screw, produced by Hawthorn Leslie. She was rigged with three masts, with square rig on the fore- and main-masts, making her a barque-rigged vessel. Her keel was laid at Devonport Royal Dockyard on 8 January 1883 and she was launched on 23 June 1884. Her entire class were re-classified in November 1884 as sloops before they entered service.

== Career ==
Mariner was commissioned into the Royal Navy on 19 March 1885. She became a boom defence vessel in 1903 and was lent to the Liverpool Salvage Association as a salvage vessel in 1917, with her sister-ship Reindeer. She was laid up from 1922 to 1929 and sold to Hughes Bolckow of Blyth on 19 March 1929.
