= HMS Reindeer (1883) =

Royal Navy Mariner-class composite screw gunvessel of 8 guns

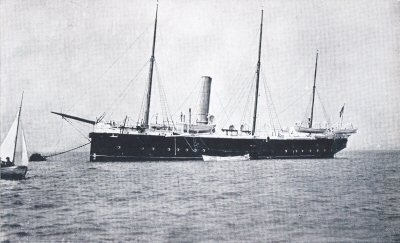
- HMS Racer, sister ship to HMS Reindeer

History

United Kingdom
- Name: HMS Reindeer
- Builder: Devonport Dockyard
- Cost: Hull: £34,834, Machinery: £12,787
- Laid down: 15 January 1883
- Launched: 14 November 1883
- Fate: Lent to the Liverpool Salvage Association in 1917 and renamed Reindeer I; Sold on 12 July 1924

General characteristics
- Class & type: Mariner-class composite screw sloop
- Displacement: 970 tons
- Length: 167 ft (51 m)
- Beam: 32 ft (9.8 m)
- Draught: 14 ft (4.3 m)
- Installed power: 850 ihp (630 kW)
- Propulsion: 2-cylinder horizontal compound-expansion steam engine; Single screw
- Sail plan: Barque-rigged
- Speed: 11 1/2 knots (21.3 km/h)
- Range: Approximately 2,100 nmi (3,900 km) at 10 kn (19 km/h)
- Complement: 126
- Armament: 8 × 5-inch 38cwt breech-loading guns; 1 × light gun; 8 × machine guns

HMS Reindeer was a Royal Navy Mariner-class composite screw gunvessel of 8 guns.

== Construction ==
Designed by Nathaniel Barnaby, the Royal Navy Director of Naval Construction, her hull was of composite construction; that is, iron keel, frames, stem and stern posts with wooden planking. She was fitted with a 2-cylinder horizontal compound expansion steam engine driving a single screw, produced by Hawthorn Leslie. She was rigged with three masts, with square rig on the fore- and main-masts, making her a barque-rigged vessel. Her keel was laid at Devonport Royal Dockyard on 15 January 1883 and she was launched on 14 November 1883. Her entire class were re-classified in November 1884 as sloops before they entered service.

== Career ==
She was converted to a boom defence vessel in 1904. During World War I, she collided with the Royal Navy stores carrier HMS Immingham in the Mediterranean Sea on 6 June 1915, sinking Immingham. She was lent to the Liverpool Salvage Association as a salvage vessel in 1917. Re-engined in 1918 by Fairfield Shipbuilding and Engineering Company with a 2,100 horsepower (1,566 kW) engine, she was renamed Reindeer I and sold to the Halifax Shipyard Ltd as a salvage ship on 12 July 1924. She was abandoned at sea on 12 March 1932. Her 30 crew were rescued by the ocean liner Montcalm.
