= HMS Blackwater =

HMS Blackwater is the name of two of Royal Navy vessels, named after the English River Blackwater:

- HMS Blackwater (1903), a River-class destroyer launched in 1903 and sunk in 1909
- HMS Blackwater (M2008), a River-class minesweeper, launched in 1984 and sold to the Brazilian Navy in 1998 as Vital de Oliveira
