= Mariner-class gunvessel =

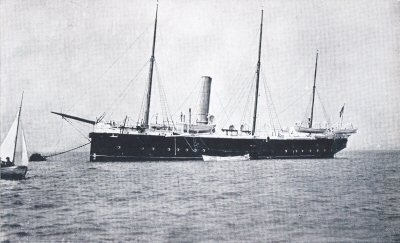
- HMS Racer

Class overview
- Name: Mariner
- Builders: Devonport Dockyard; Malta Dockyard; Milford Haven Shipbuilding Co
- Operators: Royal Navy
- Cost: Hull: £34,834; Machinery: £12,787; (Reindeer)
- Built: 1883–1888
- In commission: 1883–1929
- Completed: 6

General characteristics
- Type: Composite screw gunvessel (rated as sloops from 1884)
- Displacement: 970 tons
- Length: 167 ft (51 m) pp
- Beam: 32 ft (9.8 m)
- Draught: 14 ft (4.3 m)
- Installed power: 850 ihp (630 kW)
- Propulsion: 2-cylinder horizontal compound-expansion steam engine; Single screw
- Sail plan: Barque-rigged, except Icarus (barquentine-rigged)
- Speed: 11 1/2 knots (21.3 km/h)
- Range: Approximately 2,100 nmi (3,900 km) at 10 kn (19 km/h)
- Complement: 126
- Armament: 8 × 5-inch 38cwt breech-loading guns (Note: Except Melita, which had 40cwt versions, and Reindeer, which had only 6 of the 38cwt version. Icarus had additional QF guns fitted in 1890.); 1 × light gun; 8 × machine guns

The Mariner class was a class of six 8-gun gunvessels (sloops from 1884) built for the Royal Navy between 1883 and 1888. Four were built in the Naval Dockard at Devonport, and two elsewhere; the Acorn was built by contract at Jacobs Pill on the Pembroke River (a private yard founded in the 1870s by Sir Edward Reed), while the Melita was built in the Malta Dockyard, the only substantial ship of the Royal Navy ever to be built in the island.

== Construction ==
=== Design ===
Designed by Nathaniel Barnaby, the Royal Navy Director of Naval Construction, the hull was of composite construction; that is, iron keel, frames, stem and stern posts with wooden planking. The entire class were re-classified in November 1884 as sloops before they entered service.

=== Propulsion ===
Propulsion was provided by a 2-cylinder horizontal compound-expansion steam engine of 850 indicated horsepower (634 kW) driving a single screw. This arrangement provided enough power to drive the ships at 11 1/2 knots (21.3 km/h), although Icarus and Melita recorded 12.5 knots.

=== Sail plan ===
All the ships of the class were built as barque-rigged vessels, except Icarus, which had no main yards provided, making her a barquentine.

=== Armament ===
The class was designed and built to carry eight 5-inch 38cwt breech-loading guns, (Note: "5-inch" refers to the calibre of the gun; 38cwt is the weight of the gun in hundredweight.) one light gun and eight machine guns. Melita had 40cwt guns instead of 38cwt, and Reindeer had two of her guns removed.

== Construction ==
All the ships were laid down in 1882-83. While most of the ships were completed relatively quickly, Melita took six years to build. The intention behind building her at Malta was to make use of the substantial workforce at Malta Dockyard who were otherwise (it was felt) unemployed when the Mediterranean Fleet was away. The experiment cost £10,000 more than the British-built versions, and incurred substantial delay; it was not repeated, and Melita remained the only warship of any significant size ever built in Malta for the Royal Navy.

== Ships ==
Name	Ship builder	Launched	Fate
Mariner	Devonport Dockyard	23 June 1884	Boom defence in 1903. Lent to Liverpool Salvage Association as a salvage vessel in 1917. Laid up from 1922 to 1929. Sold to Hughes Bolckow, Blyth on 19 February 1929
Reindeer	Devonport Dockyard	14 November 1883	Boom defence in 1904. Lent to Liverpool Salvage Association as a salvage vessel in 1917, renamed Reindeer I. Sold to Halifax Shipyard Ltd as a salvage ship on 12 July 1924. Abandoned at sea in March 1932
Racer	Devonport Dockyard	6 August 1884	Tender to Britannia at Dartmouth in 1896; tender to Osborne College, Cowes in February 1903. Salvage vessel in June 1917. Sold to Hughes Bolckow, Blyth on 6 November 1928
Icarus	Devonport Dockyard	27 July 1885	Sold on 12 April 1904
Acorn	Milford Haven Shipbuilding Co	6 September 1884	Sold to Harris, Bristol on 15 December 1899. Broken up at Milford Haven in 1904
Melita	Malta Dockyard	20 March 1888	Boom defence in May 1905. Salvage vessel in December 1915, renamed Ringdove. Sold to Falmouth Docks Company on 9 July 1920, renamed Ringdove's Aid. Sold again in 1926 to Liverpool and Glasgow Salvage Association, renamed Restorer, and finally broken up in 1937

== See also ==
Media related to Mariner class gunvessel at Wikimedia Commons
