= Edward Fitzmaurice Inglefield =

Royal Navy admiral (1861–1945)

Rear-Admiral Sir Edward Fitzmaurice Inglefield KBE
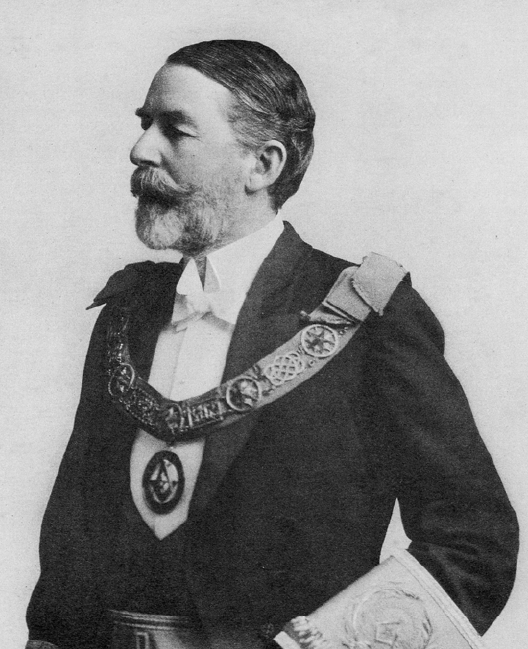
- Rear-Admiral Edward Fitzmaurice Inglefield, KBE in masonic dress in 1919
- Born: 10 April 1861; Wavertree, near Liverpool, Lancashire
- Died: 19 July 1945 (aged 84); Burke House, Beaconsfield
- Father: Edward Augustus Inglefield
- Military career
- Allegiance: United Kingdom
- Branch: Royal Navy
- Service years: 1861–1906
- Rank: Rear-Admiral
- Commands: HMS Antrim
- Awards: Egyptian medal with Nile clasp; Khedive's bronze star; Knight Commander of the Order of the British Empire (1919); Commander of the Order of the British Empire (1918)
- Other work: Secretary of Lloyd's of London 1906 - 1921

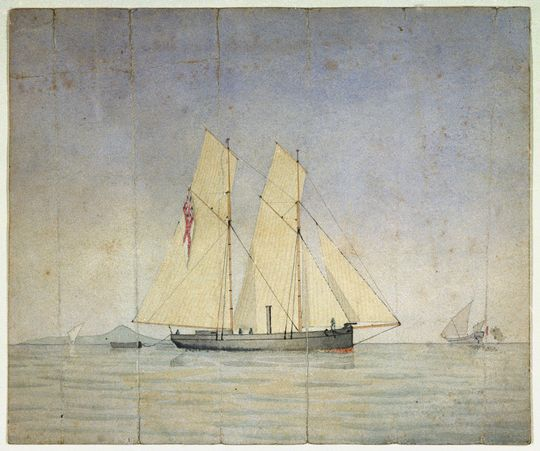
A Pinnace for Chasing Slaves by E F Inglefield, c.1880

Rear-Admiral Sir Edward Fitzmaurice Inglefield, KBE (1861–1945) was a Victorian Royal Navy officer and later secretary of Lloyd's of London. He gave his name to the Inglefield clip, a device he patented in 1890 for quickly attaching signal flags.

== Family ==
Edward Fitzmaurice Inglefield born on 10 April 1861 at Wavertree, near Liverpool, Lancashire, the youngest son of Edward Augustus Inglefield (1820–1894), Arctic explorer and Royal Navy admiral. He married Julia Katherine Margaret née Wilson in 1887; in 1891 she submitted a petition for divorce although the 1911 census shows them as still married but living apart.

== Naval career ==
=== Midshipman ===
He joined the Royal Navy in 1874 and was promoted to midshipman on 16 March 1876, and joined the Emerald-class screw corvette HMS Tourmaline on 5 March 1879, probably on the North America and West Indies Station.

=== Service as a lieutenant ===
He was promoted to lieutenant on 3 July 1883. A painting by Lieutenant E F Inglefield survives in the National Maritime Museum entitled A Pinnace for Chasing Slaves. It seems probable that he served in HMS London during her time engaged in the East African anti-slavery campaign of the late 19th century. He served in the Sudan, in the relief of Khartoum in 1884-85 and commanded a torpedo boat during the blockade of Greece in 1886. On 1 September 1888 he was appointed the flag lieutenant to Rear-Admiral St. George Caulfield D'Arcy Irvine.

=== HMS Melita and the Inglefield Clip ===
Lieutenant Inglefield was sent to Malta in 1889 to become the first lieutenant of the newly launched HMS Melita. She did not commission until 27 October 1892, and during the long wait he invented the Inglefield clip, patenting the invention in 1894. The prototype device was fashioned in the naval dockyard in Valletta, and it was so successful that by 1895 it had become standard issue to Royal Navy ships. It is still in use today.

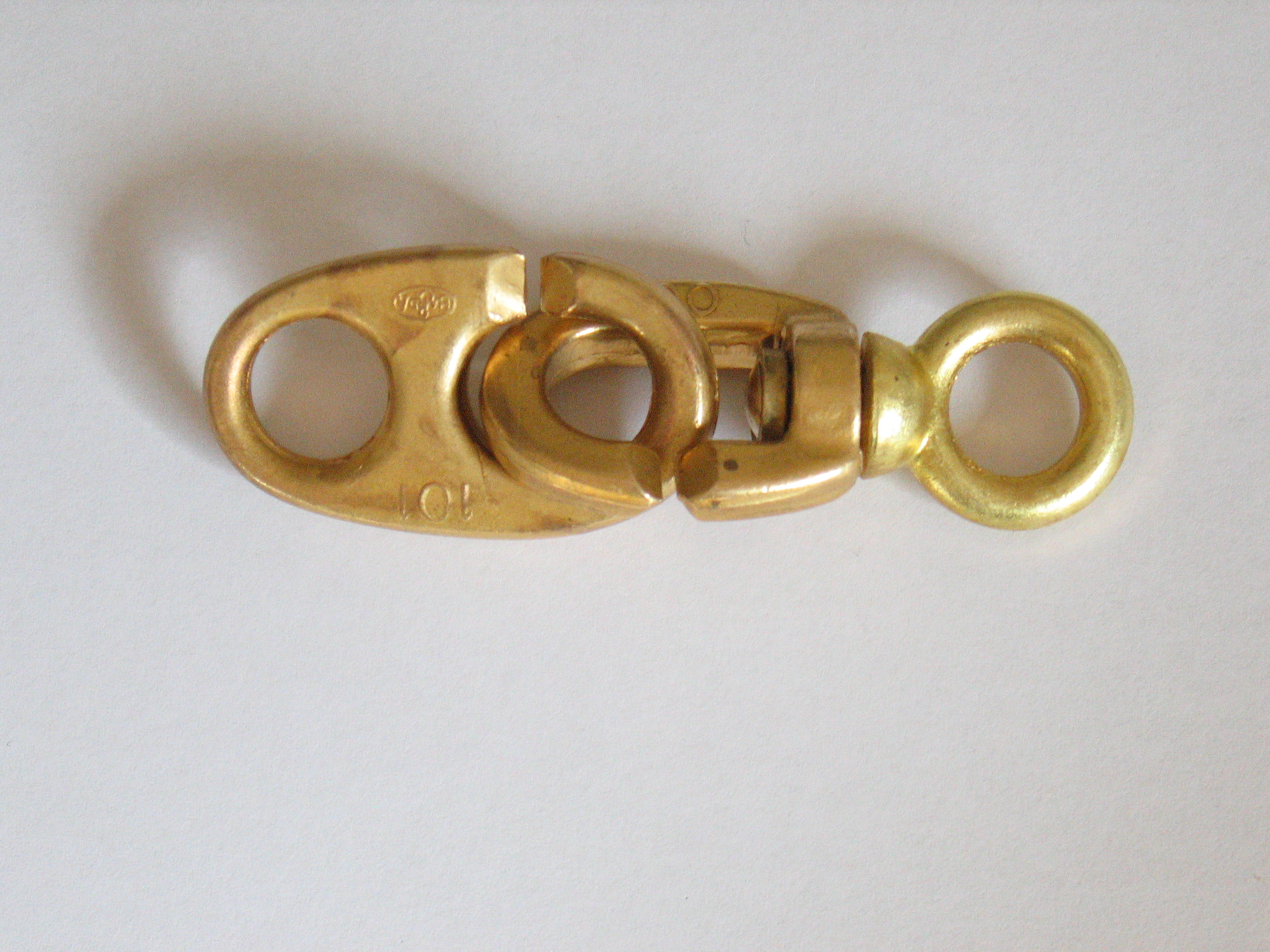
A pair of brass Inglefield clips

=== Victoria and Ramilles ===
He was appointed as first lieutenant to HMS Victoria, flagship of Vice Admiral George Tryon, in April 1893. He was hospitalised by an accident, and was therefore absent from the ship in June when she collided with Camperdown and was sunk. Tryon was killed in the sinking, and Inglefield was appointed to the new flagship, Ramillies, flying the flag of Admiral Michael Culme-Seymour. On 30 June 1895 he was promoted to commander, on the same day as his cousin, Frederick Inglefield, was promoted to captain.

=== Service as a commander ===
He continued to serve in the Mediterranean in the battleships Trafalgar and Royal Sovereign and in 1899 was appointed in command of Swallow on the South America Station. He was promoted to captain on 17 July 1901.

=== Service as a captain ===
From 1901 to 1905 he served as assistant director of Naval Intelligence, during which time he worked on Trade Division plans for advising ship owners of safe routes in the event of war. The groundwork conducted during this period, and the relationships he formed with mercantile marine operators, came to be crucial during World War I. In 1905 returned to sea to command the Devonshire-class armoured cruiser HMS Antrim, part of the First Cruiser Squadron of the Channel Fleet. He was placed on the retired list on 30 June 1907 and was appointed to the rank of rear admiral on the retired list on 9 March 1911.

== Business interests ==
On leaving the Navy in 1906, he became the Secretary to Lloyd's of London, retaining the position until 1921. In 1935 he was listed in the Directory of Directors as the company chairman of the Rio de Janeiro Lighterage Company Ltd. He was appointed a Commander of the Military Division of the Most Excellent Order of the British Empire on 7 January 1918 and elevated to Knight Commander on 1 January 1919.

== Masonry ==
Inglefield was a freemason, and was for many years a member of the Lutine Lodge, made up of employees of Lloyds. He was the Provincial Grand Master of Buckinghamshire from 1916 to 1929, when he was succeeded by Philip Eliot, Bishop of Buckingham.

== Inventions ==
In addition to the Inglefield clip, he continued inventing into later life; in 1923 he submitted Patent GB209652 for improvements to valve arrangements.

== Death ==
Inglefield died on 19 July 1945 at the age of 84.
