= Frederick Inglefield =

Royal Navy Admiral (1854–1921)

Admiral Sir Frederick Inglefield KCB DL FRGS
- Born: 29 April 1854
- Died: 8 August 1921 (aged 67); Flower Lillies, Windley, Derbyshire
- Burial place: Turnditch church 53.015871°N 1.560966°W
- Military career
- Allegiance: United Kingdom
- Branch: Royal Navy
- Rank: Admiral
- Commands: HMS Acorn; HMS Bonaventure; HMS Devastation; HMS Royal Sovereign; 4th Cruiser Squadron; Coastguard and Reserves; Auxiliary Coastal Patrol Forces
- Conflicts: World War I
- Awards: Khedive's bronze star Aide de camp Knight Commander of the Order of the Bath; Grand Officer of the Order of the Crown of Italy

Admiral Sir Frederick Samuel Inglefield, KCB, DL, FRGS (29 April 1854 – 8 August 1921) was a Royal Navy officer who served as Fourth Sea Lord, was appointed as a Grand Officer of the Order of the Crown of Italy and commanded auxiliary patrol forces in World War I. After retirement he was a Deputy Lieutenant of Derbyshire.

== Early life ==
Inglefield was born on 29 April 1854 to Colonel Samuel Inglefield of the Royal Artillery. (Note: Some sources have him the son of Commander (later Rear Admiral) Valentine Otway Inglefield (1824–1900) and his wife Henriette Inglefield (née Thiébault) (1823–?)) He came from a long line of naval officers; his grandfather was Rear Admiral Samuel Inglefield, his great-grandfather was Captain John Nicholson Inglefield, and his uncle was the Arctic explorer Admiral Sir Edward Augustus Inglefield. He joined the Royal Navy as a cadet in the training ship HMS Britannia at the age of 13.

== Naval career ==
Inglefield became a sub-lieutenant in 1874 and was promoted to lieutenant on 30 January 1877. He joined the screw corvette Euryalus in 1878 on the East Indies Station and the flagship of the Channel Fleet, Minotaur, in 1882. She was temporarily detached to the Mediterranean to take part in the Anglo-Egyptian War, and Inglefield was awarded the Khedive's bronze star. In April 1885 he was appointed as the first lieutenant of the gunvessel Condor, and in this role was landed in the Eastern Sudan to take part in the Second Suakin Expedition. He was clearly highly though of, because his next appointment, in February 1886, was as the first lieutenant of "the most-sought-after sea-going ship in the Service", the central battery ironclad Alexandra. At this period the Mediterranean Fleet was the foremost fleet in the Royal Navy, and it attracted the ambitious, the talented and the well-connected. As the senior lieutenant of the flagship of the Mediterranean Fleet, flying the flag of Admiral the Duke of Edinburgh, and with the future King George V as one of his lieutenants, he benefited from the patronage of the most influential officers of the day. (Note: One of his midshipmen was David Beatty.) He was promoted to commander on 30 June 1889, and was appointed to HMS Trafalgar, which had replaced Alexandra as flagship of the Mediterranean Fleet.

He commanded the screw sloop Acorn on the South America Station, and was promoted to captain on 30 June 1895 while in command of her. He then commanded the protected cruiser Bonaventure, flagship of the East Indies Station, from January 1896 to March 1898. He left Bonaventure to command HMS Devastation in late 1898, and she was from April 1900 guardship at Gibraltar. In November 1900 he was appointed in command of the new battleship HMS Glory, and took her to serve at the China Station. He was back home when appointed in command of the battleship Royal Sovereign on 26 November 1901, when she was serving on the Mediterranean station, and took her home the following year, taking part in the fleet review held at Spithead on 16 August 1902 for the coronation of King Edward VII, before he paid her off at Portsmouth on 29 August 1902. From 15 October 1902 until 1904 he served as Assistant Director of Naval Intelligence, as head of the Mobilisation division. He was appointed a Naval Aide-de-Camp to King Edward VII on 12 April 1905.

Inglefield was appointed Fourth Sea Lord (as a captain) from 1904, and was promoted to rear admiral on 30 May 1906. He took command of the 4th Cruiser Squadron on 8 February 1907, hoisting his flag in the cruiser Grafton. He was awarded the title of Grand Officer of the Order of the Crown of Italy in recognition of services rendered by the squadron during the earthquake at Messina in Sicily in 1908. He hauled down his flag in Grafton in February 1909. From 1909 to 1912 he was Admiral Commanding the Coastguard and Reserves. Promoted to the rank of vice admiral on 24 August 1910, he was appointed a Knight Commander of the Order of the Bath (KCB) on 19 June 1911 as part of the King's coronation list.

Inglefield was promoted to the rank of admiral on 4 June 1913 and at the outbreak of World War I, being too senior for a seagoing appointment and over 60 years of age, he was appointed the president of the "Motor-Boat Committee", which existed to co-ordinate the Motor-Boat Reserve, a collection of private craft called up to support the Royal Navy as auxiliaries. He was placed on the retired list at his own request on 9 June 1916, "in order to make room for the promotion of younger officers who are rendering important services to the Empire in this war". He was later a member of the official inquiry into the loss of the RMS Lusitania which was torpedoed by a German U-boat and sank with the loss of 1,198 lives south of the Old Head of Kinsale in Ireland on 7 May 1915.

== Retirement ==
From 1912 he was a Justice of the Peace for Derbyshire and in retirement he was a Deputy Lieutenant of Derbyshire.

== Family ==
In 1903 he married Millicent Evelyn Cecilia Crompton (1866-16 November 1950), the heiress of the Derbyshire banker John Gilbert Crompton; they had two sons, Colonel John Frederick Crompton-Inglefield (who served as High Sheriff of Derbyshire in 1938) and Gilbert Samuel Inglefield (later Sir Gilbert Samuel Inglefield ARIBA TD KCB GBE FRSA, Lord Mayor of London).

== Death ==
Inglefield died on 8 August 1921 of septic poisoning, allegedly caused after an accident while rowing, at Flower Lillies, Windley, Derbyshire on 8 August 1921 at the age of 67. He was buried at Turnditch church.

== Notes ==
Military offices
Preceded by	Assistant Director Naval Intelligence (Mobilisation division); 1902–1904	Succeeded by Captain Charles John Briggs
Preceded by Sir John Durnford (As Junior Naval Lord)	Fourth Sea Lord; 1904–1907	Succeeded by Sir Alfred Winsloe
