= Inglefield clip =

Clip for joining flags to flag halyards

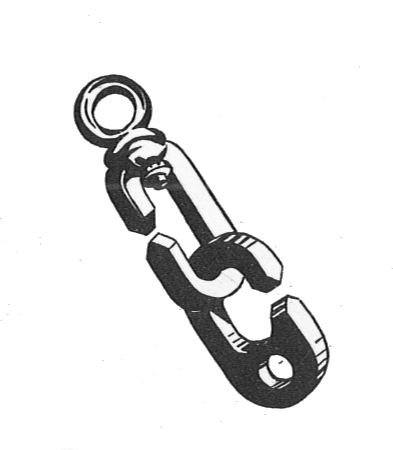
Inglefield clips, from a Royal Navy handbook of 1943

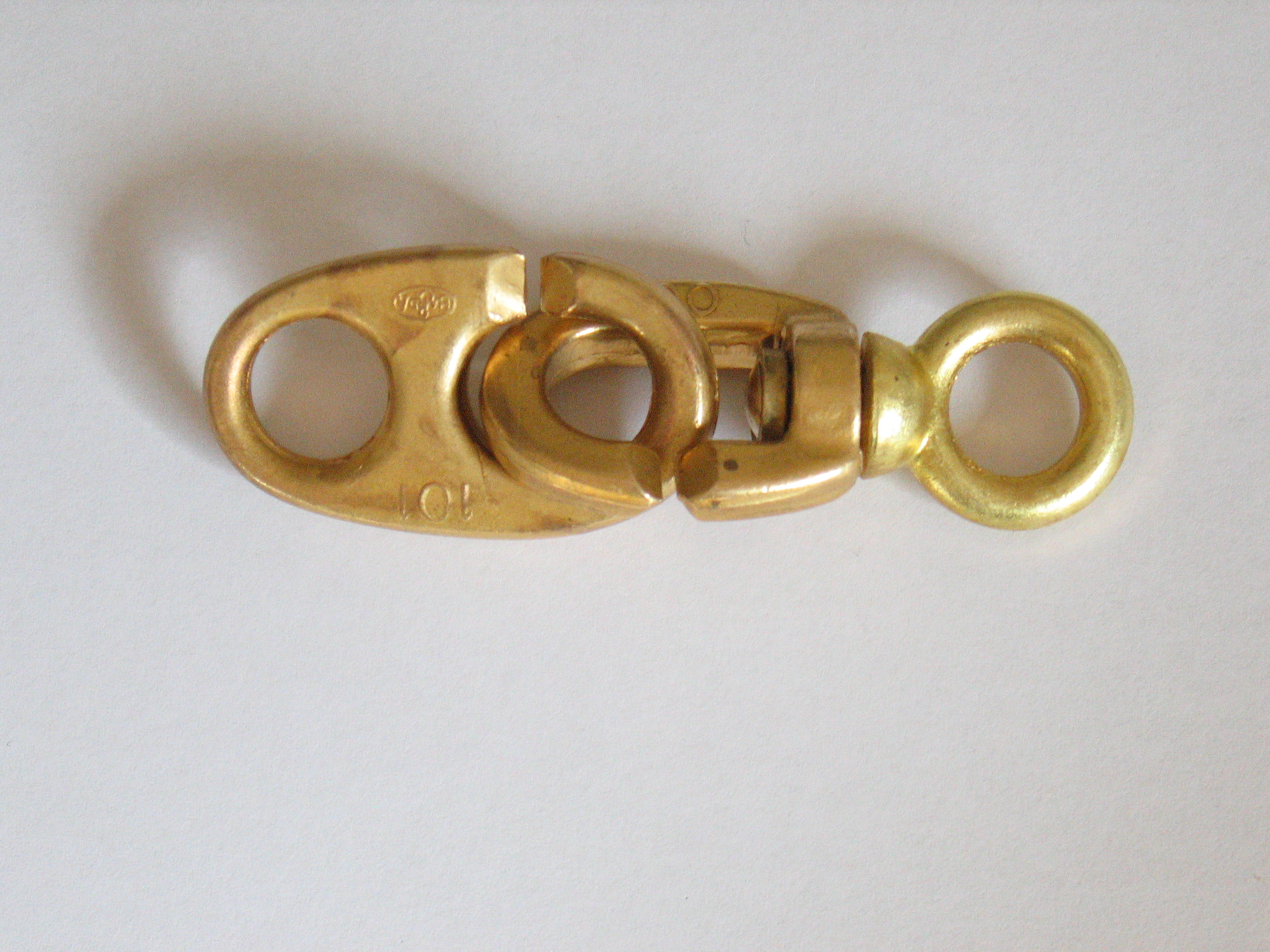
Two brass Inglefield clips connected (a standard clip on the left and a swivel clip on the right).

The Inglefield clip (also known as a sister clip and a Brummel hook) is a clip for joining a flag or ensign quickly, easily and securely to flag halyards so that the flag can be hoisted. They are also used for jib sheets on small boats and to connect the speed line in paragliders.

Each clip resembles a link of chain, with a split through one side. The edges of this split are chamfered, so that the clips can be engaged or disengaged, but only if they are carefully aligned by hand. When pulled tight, the links are securely fastened. There are no moving parts to the link, although some have additional swivel pieces.

They can be made of any durable material; commonly brass, bronze, stainless steel or plastic. The clips come in two basic types: 'standard' with the halyard attached directly to the clip, and 'swivel' which incorporates a rotational connector so that the halyard can rotate without affecting the flag. In the Royal Navy a flag or ensign normally has both types of clip, one at each end of the heading. Some flags have the top clip sewn directly onto the heading rather than a rope running through it. This allows these flags to be flown 'tight-up' against the top of the mast, gaff or yard arm.

== History ==
Lieutenant Edward Fitzmaurice Inglefield (Note: Later Rear Admiral Sir Edward Inglefield KBE) invented these clips for attaching signalling flags whilst serving in HMS Melita in the early 1890s. The first set of prototype clips was made up in the Malta Dockyard and by 1895 Inglefield clips were standard issue to the British Royal Navy.
