= Edward Augustus Inglefield =

Royal Navy Admiral and Arctic expeditionary (1820–1894)

Admiral Sir Edward Inglefield KCB FRS FRGS
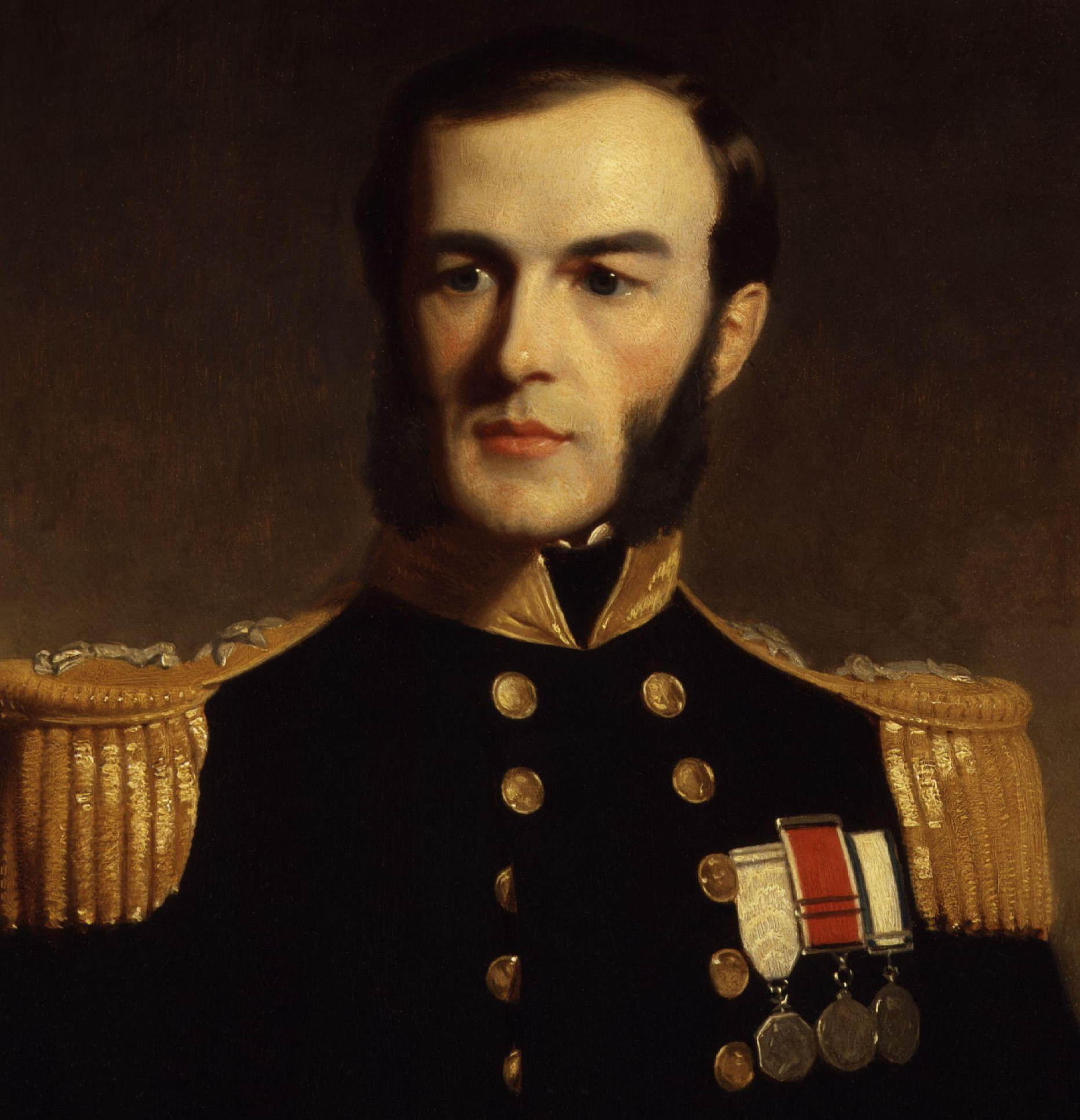

North America and West Indies Station
- Commander-in-Chief; 1 April 1878 – 27 November 1879
- Preceded by: Sir Astley Key
- Succeeded by: Sir Leopold McClintock

Personal details
- Born: Edward Augustus Inglefield; 27 March 1820 Cheltenham, England
- Died: 4 September 1894 (aged 74) South Kensington, England
- Resting place: Kensal Green Cemetery
- Spouse: Eliza Johnston (m. 1857)
- Children: Edward Fitzmaurice Inglefield
- Parent: Samuel Hood Inglefield (father)
- Awards: Royal Geographical Society's Patron's Medal (1853); Knight Commander of the Order of the Bath (1887)

Military service
- Branch: Royal Navy
- Service years: 1832–1885
- Rank: Admiral
- Wars: Crimean War

Sir Edward Augustus Inglefield KCB FRS FRGS (27 March 1820 – 4 September 1894) was a Royal Navy officer who led one of the searches for the missing Arctic explorer John Franklin during the 1850s. In doing so, his expedition charted previously unexplored areas along the northern Canadian coastline, including Baffin Bay, Smith Sound and Lancaster Sound.

He was also the inventor of the marine hydraulic steering gear and the anchor design that bears his name. HMS Inglefield bears his name, as do the Inglefield Land region and the Inglefield Gulf of Greenland.

== Career ==
=== First voyage to the Arctic ===
Inglefield set out from Britain on his search in July 1852, commanding Lady Franklin's private steamer Isabel, seven years after Sir John Franklin had left on his ill-fated search for the fabled Northwest Passage. Once Inglefield had reached the Arctic, a search and survey of Greenland's west coast was made; Ellesmere Island was resighted and named in honour of the president of the Royal Geographical Society.

Smith Sound was penetrated further than any known records; Jones Sound was also searched; and a landing was made at Beechey Island in Lancaster Sound. No sign, however, of Franklin's expedition was found. Finally, before the onset of winter forced Inglefield to turn homewards, the expedition searched and charted much of Baffin Island's eastern coast.

Despite finding no traces of the Franklin expedition, Inglefield was fêted on his return for the surveying his expedition had achieved. The Royal Geographical Society awarded him its 1853 Patron's Medal "for his enterprising survey of the coasts of Baffin Bay, Smith Sound and Lancaster Sound."

=== Subsequent Arctic voyages ===
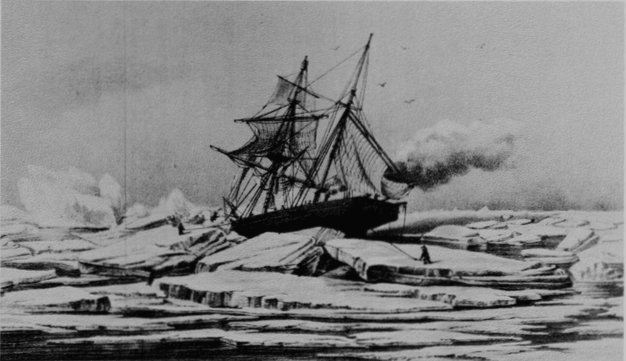
Isabel searching for the Franklin expedition

Inglefield made two further voyages to the Arctic in HMS Phoenix, to supply the search for the Franklin expedition overseen by Sir Edward Belcher. He returned from the first of these in 1853, bringing with him the first officer to have traversed the Northwest Passage, Samuel Gurney Cresswell of HMS Investigator. The Investigator had also been sent to join the search for the Franklin expedition, but starting from the western side of northern Canada.

Arriving back in the Arctic the following year, 1854, Inglefield found Belcher's ships abandoned, save one to which the crews had retreated. Most of these men returned with Inglefield to Britain.

== Later life ==
Soon after his return from the Arctic, Inglefield was sent to join the Crimean War in the Black Sea as captain of HMS Firebrand, where he took part in the siege of Sevastopol. After the Crimean War, he captained a number of ships and continued to rise through the ranks.

In 1869, he was made a rear admiral and three years later was appointed Admiral Superintendent of Malta Dockyard. Promotions to vice admiral and then admiral followed, between which he was knighted. In 1878, he was appointed Commander-in-Chief, North America and West Indies Station.

Inglefield retired in 1885. Thereafter he devoted much of his time to painting and his watercolours of Arctic landscapes were exhibited at several art galleries in London.

== Personal life ==
On 30 April 1857, Inglefield married Eliza Fanny Johnston (1836–1890), the daughter of Edward Johnston, Esq. of Allerton Hall, Liverpool. Together, they were the parents of four sons and one daughter:

1. Henry Beaufort Willmot Inglefield (1859–1926), who married Mary Lucia MacHugh, Lady Holker in 1894. She was the widow of Sir John Holker (1828–1882). After her death, he married Alexandra Amy Geraldine Butler (d. 1931), the widow of William George Gould (d. 1911)
2. Edward Fitzmaurice Inglefield (1861–1945), a Royal Navy officer (eventually rear admiral), inventor of the flag-raising Inglefield clip, and Secretary to Lloyd's of London.
3. Albany Otway Inglefield (1872–1873)
4. Ernest Hallowell Inglefield (d. 1879)
5. Sybill Inglefield (d. 1870)

Inglefield died in 1894; he is buried in Kensal Green Cemetery in west London.
