= Buzzard (disambiguation) =

A buzzard is a bird of prey.

Buzzard may also refer to:

== Arts and entertainment ==
=== Film ===
- Buzzard (film), a 2014 American independent film
- Buzz Buzzard, animated cartoon character from 1948 to 1972

=== Literature ===
- Der Busant (The Buzzard), a Middle High German verse narrative
- The Buzzards, 1969 novel by American author Janet Burroway
- The Buzzards and Other Poems, 1921 collection by English author Martin Armstrong

=== Music ===
- Dr. Buzzard's Original Savannah Band, New York City band from the late 1970s
- The Honey Buzzards, English band from the early 1990s
- Leyton Buzzards (known as The Buzzards), British rock band from the 1970s
- Los Buzzardos (also known as The Buzzards), a backup band of American musician Jack White
- Tucky Buzzard, British hard rock band from the early 1970s
- "Buzzards", a song by the Sword from the 2015 album High Country

== People ==
- Buzzard baronets, a title in the Baronetage of the United Kingdom
  - Farquhar Buzzard (1871–1945), British physician son of Thomas Buzzard (1831-1919) a neurologist
  - Sir Anthony Buzzard, 2nd Baronet (1902–1972), British Navy officer
  - Sir Anthony Buzzard, 3rd Baronet (born 1935), British theologian
- Curtis A. Buzzard, American general
- Kevin Buzzard (born 1968), British mathematician
- Leyton Buzzard (born 1997), English professional wrestler, born Arthur Byrne
- Robert Buzzard (born 1942), American wrestler
- R. W. Buzzard, American judge
- Thomas Buzzard (1831–1919), English doctor
- Ulysses G. Buzzard (1865–1939), American soldier and Medal of Honor recipient
- Olivier Levasseur (c. 1689–1730), French pirate, nicknamed La Buse ("The Buzzard")

== Places ==
- Buzzard oil field, in the North Sea
- Buzzard Point, urbanized area between the Potomac and Anacostia Rivers, Washington, D.C.
- Buzzard Roost, Alabama, an unincorporated community in Colbert County, Alabama
- Buzzards Bay (disambiguation), several places
- Leighton Buzzard, a town in Bedfordshire, England

== Transportation ==
=== Aircraft ===
- Buzzman L'il Buzzard, Canadian ultralight aircraft
- Luton Buzzard, British single-seat, open cockpit ultralight aircraft from the 1930s
- Martinsyde Buzzard, British World War I era biplane fighter
- Redback Buzzard, Australian helicopter design
- Rolls-Royce Buzzard, British piston aero engine from the 1920s
- Snyder Buzzard, American light sport aircraft of the 1930s

=== Ships ===
- HMS Buzzard, a list of ships with this name
- Sarych ("Buzzard"), Russian name for the Sovremennyy-class destroyer

== Other uses ==
- Buzzard Coulee meteorite, fell in November 2008 over Saskatchewan, Canada
- Buzzard lope, a dance from the 1890s in the southern United States
- Buzzards Bay (horse), a racehorse active 2005–2008
- El Paso Buzzards, a professional ice hockey team
- Jefferson City Buzzards, a marching club in New Orleans
- State v. Buzzard, an 1842 Second-Amendment legal case in the United States
- WMMS (100.7 FM), a radio station in Cleveland, Ohio, branded "The Buzzard"
