= Anthony Buzzard =

Anthony Buzzard may refer to:

- Sir Anthony Buzzard, 2nd Baronet (1902–1972)
- Sir Anthony Buzzard, 3rd Baronet (born 1935)

== See also ==
- Buzzard (disambiguation)
