= A. R. Knapp =

British civil servant

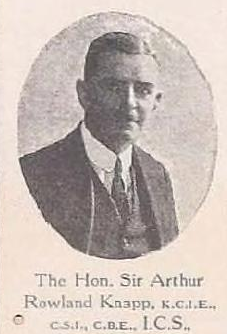
Sir Arthur Rowland Knapp CBE CSI KCIE (10 December 1870 – 22 May 1954) was a British civil servant who served as the Revenue Member of the Executive Council of the Governor of Madras from 1923 to 1926.

Sir Arthur Rowland Knapp CBE CSI KCIE (10 December 1870 – 22 May 1954) was a British civil servant who served as the Revenue Member of the Executive Council of the Governor of Madras from 1923 to 1926.

== Early life ==
Arthur Knapp was born at Woolston in 1870 to Lt Col. Charles Barrett Knapp. He was educated at Westminster School and Christ Church, Oxford. He married Florence Annie Moore on 9 August 1899 at Madras, India. His wife Florence was the daughter of Edward Moore, DD Principal of St Edmunds Hall Oxford.

His daughter Margaret Elfreda Knapp was married to the prominent Royal Navy officer and Director of Naval Intelligence Anthony Buzzard, and the theologian Anthony F. Buzzard is his grandson.

== Usage of "Knap" in Malayalam ==
During his tenure in Malabar, he implemented several policies that were out of touch with local realities, and proved impractical and inefficient. As a result, Malayalis in Kerala began using the phrase "Knap way of doing things" in everyday language to describe actions or individuals perceived as idiotic or pointless. The term remains in colloquial use in Kerala to refer to someone considered incompetent.

== Career ==
A Knapp joined the Indian civil service in 1891 and served as Assistant Collector and magistrate, Malabar district, Madras. In 1899, he was appointed Under-secretary in the Board of Revenue rising to become Secretary.

Knapp was made a Commander of the Order of the British Empire in 1919, invested as a Companion, Order of the Star of India (C.S.I.) in 1922 and Knight Commander of the Order of the Indian Empire in the 1924 New Year Honours list.

== Legislative Council ==
In 1923, Knapp was nominated to the Madras Legislative Council and served from 1923 to 1926.

== Death ==
Knapp died on 22 May 1954 at the age of 83.
