= Edmund Rushbrooke =

Royal Navy Vice Admiral (1892–1972)

Vice-Admiral Edmund Rushbrooke CBE DSC
- Born: 15 December 1892
- Died: 9 October 1972 (aged 79)
- Military career
- Allegiance: United Kingdom
- Branch: Royal Navy
- Rank: Vice-Admiral
- Commands: HMS Argus; HMS Eagle
- Conflicts: Second World War
- Awards: Commander of the Order of the British Empire; Distinguished Service Cross

Vice-Admiral Edmund Gerard Noel Rushbrooke, CBE, DSC (15 December 1892 – 9 October 1972) was a Royal Navy officer.

== Naval career ==
Rushbrooke served in the Second World War as commanding officer of the aircraft carrier HMS Argus from August 1940 and of the aircraft carrier HMS Eagle from April 1941. On the early afternoon of 11 August, 1942 Eagle was hit by four torpedoes from the German submarine U-73, commanded by Helmut Rosenbaum, and sank within four minutes, 70 nautical miles (130 km; 81 mi) south of Cape Salinas. 131 officers and men, mainly from the ship's machinery spaces, were lost in the sinking. Rushbrooke survived and went on to be Director of Naval Intelligence in November 1942.

== Sources ==
- Smith, Peter C. (1995). Eagle's War: War Diary of an Aircraft Carrier. Bristol, UK: Crécy Books. ISBN 0-947554-60-2.

Military offices
Preceded by John Godfrey	Director of Naval Intelligence; 1942–1946	Succeeded by Edward Parry
