= Edward Parry (Royal Navy officer, born 1893) =

Royal Navy Admiral (1893–1972)

Admiral Sir Edward Parry KCB
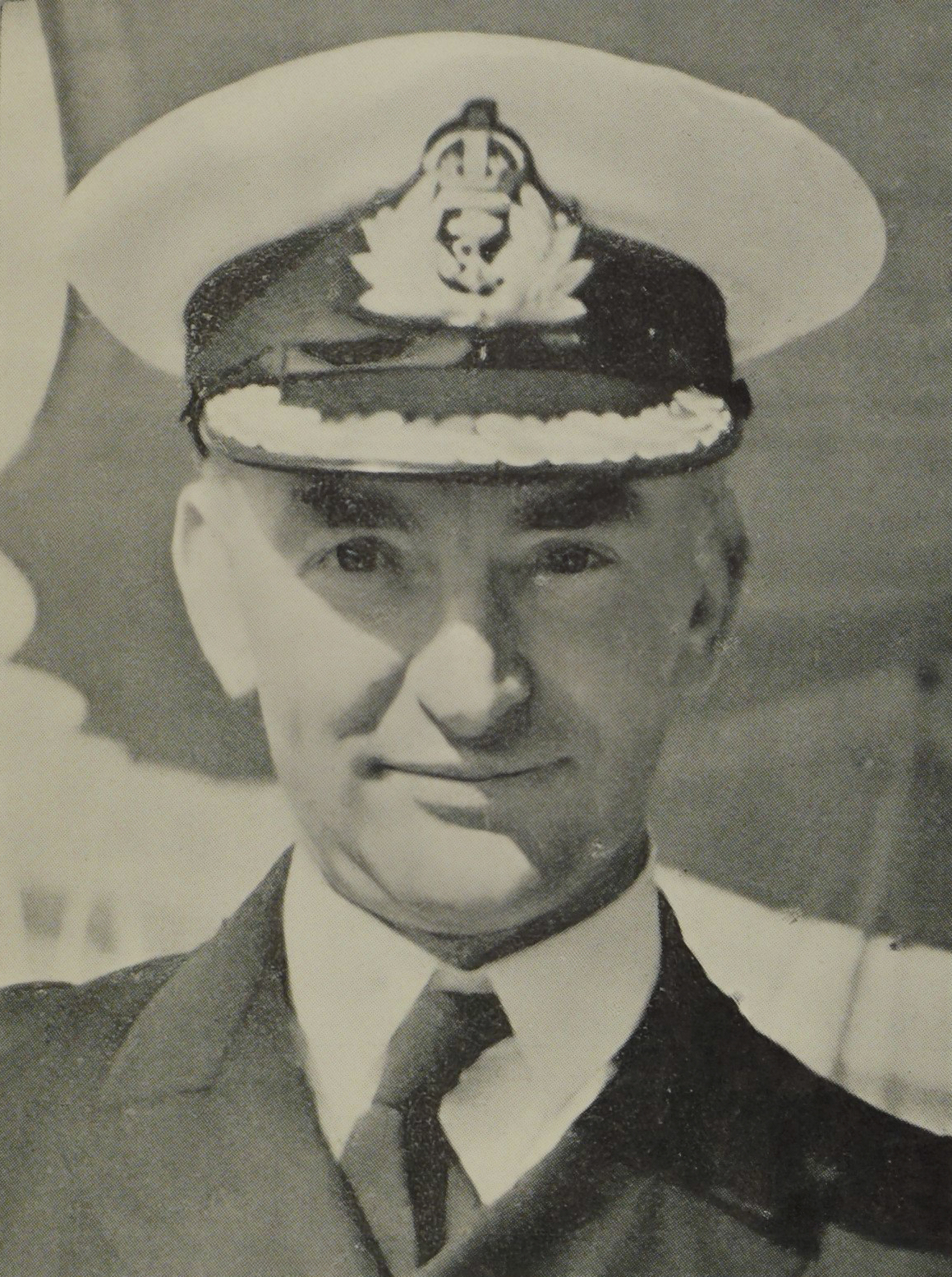

1st Commander-in-Chief, Indian Navy (later CNS)
- In office 26 January 1950 – 13 October 1951
- President: Rajendra Prasad
- Prime Minister: Jawaharlal Nehru
- Preceded by: Office Established
- Succeeded by: Mark Pizey

2nd Chief of the Naval Staff and Commander-in-Chief, Royal Indian Navy
- In office 14 August 1948 – 25 January 1950
- Monarch: George VI
- Governor General: C. Rajagopalachari
- Prime Minister: Jawaharlal Nehru
- Preceded by: John Talbot Savignac Hall
- Succeeded by: Office Abolished

Personal details
- Born: 8 April 1893 London, England
- Died: 21 August 1972 (aged 79) London, England
- Awards: Knight Commander of the Order of the Bath; Commander of the Legion of Merit (United States); Officer of the Legion of Honour (France)

Military service
- Allegiance: United Kingdom
- Branch/service: Royal Navy
- Years of service: 1905–1951
- Rank: Admiral
- Commands: New Zealand Division; HMS Renown; Royal Indian Navy
- Battles/wars: First World War; Second World War; Battle of the River Plate; Normandy landings

Admiral Sir William Edward Parry, KCB (8 April 1893 – 21 August 1972) was an officer of the Royal Navy.

== Naval career ==
Parry joined the Royal Navy 1905 and served in the First World War.

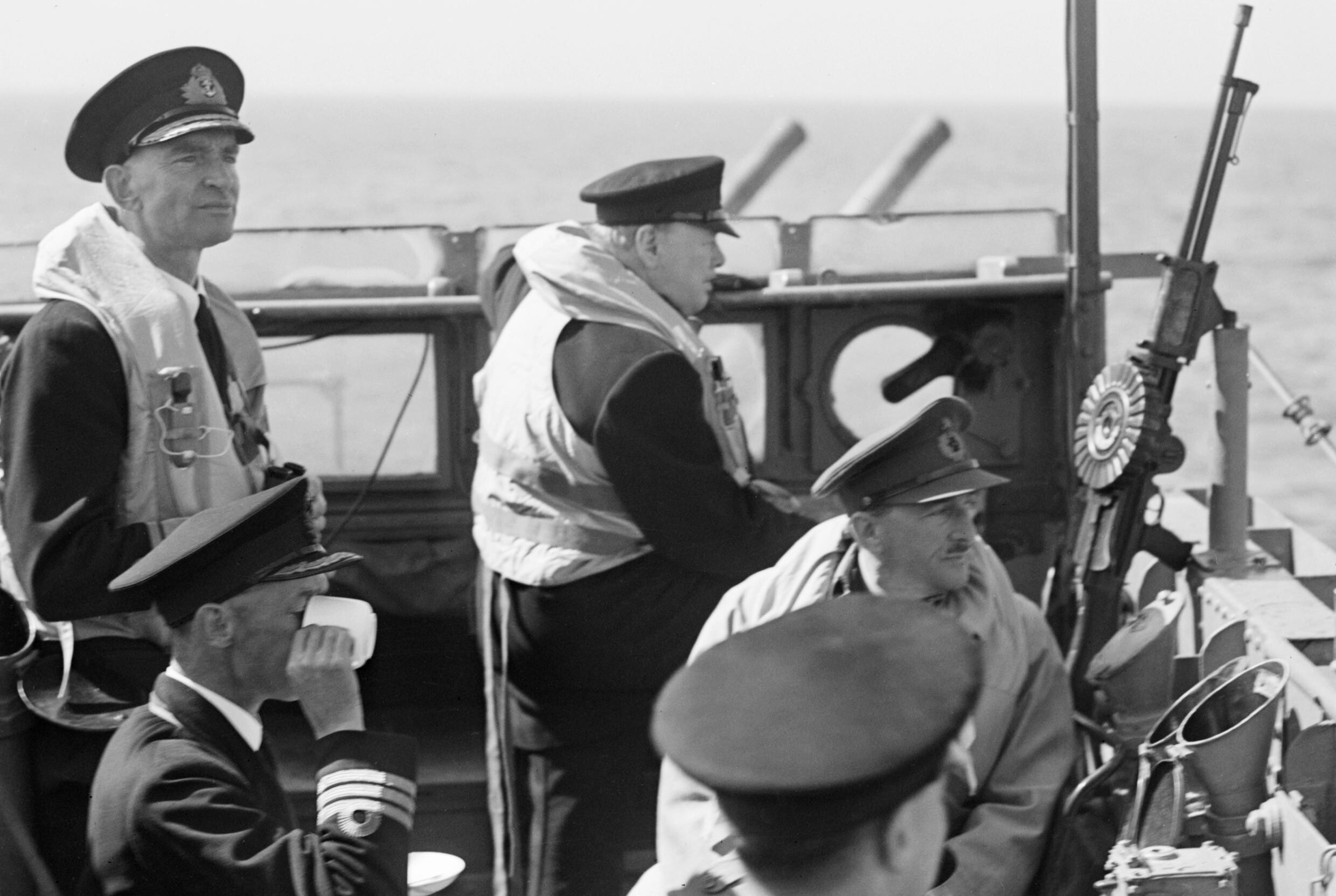
Prime Minister Winston Churchill and Field Marshal Sir Alan Brooke on the bridge of HMS Kelvin during a visit to France shortly after the Normandy landings, 12 June 1944. Parry is standing behind Churchill.

His appointments from 1936 were:

- January–February 1936 Senior Officers' Technical Course, Portsmouth
- 14.04.1936 - 1937 Captain Anti-Submarine & Commanding Officer, HMS Osprey (Anti-Submarine School, Portland);
- 1938 Imperial Defence Course, Imperial Defence College [HMS President];
- 27.01.1939 - 30.04.1940 Commanding Officer, HMNZS Achilles, New Zealand Division. The Second World War broke out from September 1939. Commanded ship at Battle of the River Plate in December 1939. He was wounded in the legs when shrapnel hit the bridge;
- Commanding Officer HMNZS Achilles & from 05.01.1940 to 28.01.1940 as Flag Captain & Chief Staff Officer to Rear-Admiral [Harwood?], Commanding South America Division
- 01.05.1940 - 15.10.1940 First Naval Member of New Zealand Naval Board (Navy Office, Wellington)
- 16.10.1940 - 30.06.1942 Chief of Naval Staff of New Zealand Naval Board (Navy Office, Wellington)
- 01.07.1942 - 18.08.1942 HMS Victory (additional; for passage to UK & foreign service leave)
- 19.08.1942 - 27.08.1942 HMS President (additional; for duty inside Admiralty with Operations Division)
- 28.08.1942 - 20.10.1942 HMS Cormorant (RN base, Gibraltar) (additional; for special duty on staff of Flag Officer Commanding North Atlantic (FOCNA))
- 21.10.1942 - 31.10.1942 HMS President (additional; for duty outside Admiralty as Commodore Naval Expeditionary Force (NXF))
- November 1942 - 18.12.1942 HMS Excellent II (for HMS Evolution; as Commodore Naval Expeditionary Force (NXF))

He assumed command of HMS Renown in 1943. He took part in the Normandy landings and served on the staff of Allied Naval Commander-in-Chief of the Expeditionary Force in 1944. After the war he became Deputy Head of the Naval Division at the Allied Control Commission in Germany. Parry became Director of Naval Intelligence in July 1946 and Chief of Naval Staff (Commander-in-Chief) of the Royal Indian Navy in August 1948. He was advanced to Knight Commander of the Order of the Bath in the 1950 New Year Honours before retiring in 1951.

In the 1956 film The Battle of the River Plate, Parry was played by Jack Gwillim.

Military offices
Preceded by Henry Horan	Commander-in-Chief, New Zealand Division; 1940–1941	Post discontinued
Preceded by Edmund Rushbrooke	Director of Naval Intelligence; 1946–1948	Succeeded by Eric Longley-Cook
Preceded by John Talbot Savignac Hall	Chief of the Naval Staff and Commander-in-Chief, Indian Navy; 1948–1951	Succeeded by Eric Longley-Cook
