= HMS Eagle (1918) =

Aircraft carrier of 1918

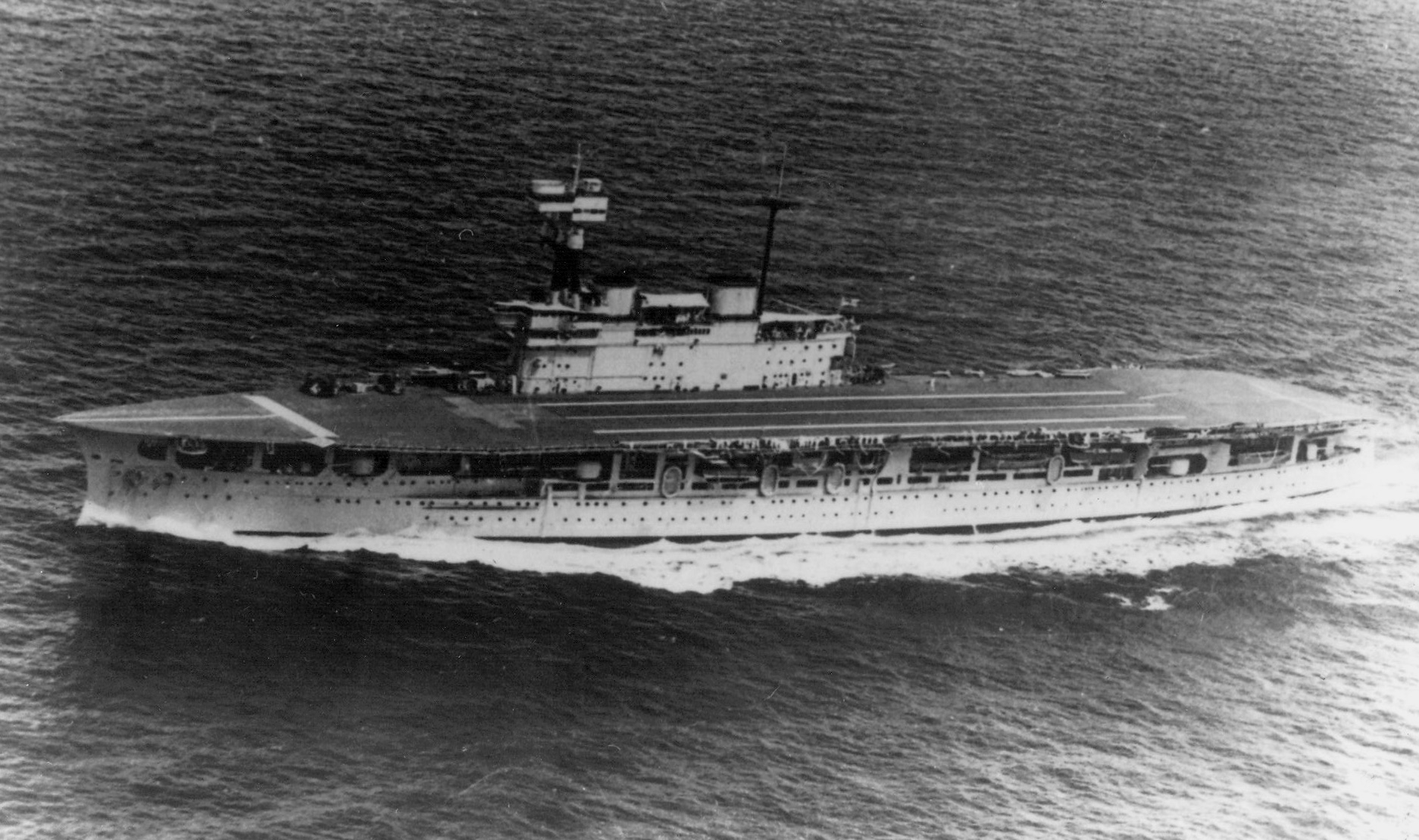
- Aerial view of Eagle in the 1930s

Class overview
- Preceded by: HMS Hermes
- Succeeded by: Courageous class

History

United Kingdom
- Name: Eagle
- Ordered: 29 July 1912
- Builder: Armstrong Whitworth
- Yard number: 858
- Laid down: 20 February 1913
- Launched: 8 June 1918
- Acquired: Purchased, 28 February 1918
- Commissioned: 20 February 1924
- Identification: Pennant number: 94
- Fate: Sunk during Operation Pedestal, 11 August 1942

General characteristics (as completed in 1924)
- Type: Aircraft carrier
- Displacement: 21,850 long tons (22,200 t) (standard)
- Length: 667 ft 6 in (203.5 m)
- Beam: 115 ft (35.1 m)
- Draught: 26 ft 8 in (8.1 m) (deep load)
- Installed power: 32 water-tube boilers; 50,000 shp (37,000 kW)
- Propulsion: 4 shafts; 4 geared steam turbine sets
- Speed: 24 knots (44 km/h; 28 mph)
- Range: 4,800 nmi (8,900 km; 5,500 mi) at 16 knots (30 km/h; 18 mph)
- Complement: 791
- Armament: 9 × 6 in (152 mm) guns; 5 × 4 in (102 mm) AA guns
- Armour: Belt: 4.5 in (114 mm); Deck: 1–1.5 in (25–38 mm); Bulkheads: 4 in (102 mm)
- Aircraft carried: 25–30

HMS Eagle was an early aircraft carrier of the Royal Navy. Ordered by Chile during the South American dreadnought race as the Almirante Latorre-class battleship Almirante Cochrane, she was laid down before World War I. In early 1918 she was purchased by Britain for conversion to an aircraft carrier; this work was finished in 1924. Her completion was delayed by labour troubles and the possibility that she might be repurchased by Chile for reconversion into a battleship, as well as the need for comparative trials to determine the optimum layout for aircraft carriers. The ship was initially assigned to the Mediterranean Fleet and later to the China Station, spending very little time in home waters other than for periodic refits.

Eagle spent the first nine months of World War II in the Indian Ocean searching for German commerce raiders. During the early part of the war, the Fleet Air Arm was desperately short of fighters and Eagle was equipped solely with Fairey Swordfish torpedo bombers until late 1940. She was transferred to the Mediterranean in May 1940, where she escorted convoys to Malta and Greece and attacked Italian shipping, naval units and bases in the Eastern Mediterranean. The ship also participated in the Battle of Calabria in July but her aircraft failed to score any hits when they attempted to torpedo Italian cruisers during the battle. Whenever Eagle was not at sea, her aircraft were disembarked and used ashore.

The ship was relieved by a more modern carrier in March 1941 and ordered to hunt for Axis shipping in the Indian Ocean and the South Atlantic. Her aircraft sank a German blockade runner and disabled a German oil tanker in mid-1941 but did not find any other Axis ships before the ship was ordered home for a refit in October. After completing an extensive refit in early 1942, the ship made trips delivering fighter aircraft to Malta to boost its air defences in the first half of 1942. The German submarine U-73 torpedoed and sank Eagle on 11 August 1942 with 131 lives lost as the ship was escorting a convoy to Malta during Operation Pedestal.

== Design and description ==
=== Construction and conversion ===
In 1911, the Chilean Navy ordered one 28,000-long-ton (28,450 t) super-dreadnought battleship, with an option for a second ship, each to be armed with ten 14-inch (356 mm) and sixteen six-inch (152 mm) guns, that were named Almirante Latorre and Almirante Cochrane. Almirante Latorre was laid down in December 1911, followed by Almirante Cochrane at the Armstrong yards at Newcastle upon Tyne on 20 February 1913. On the outbreak of the First World War, construction of the two ships was suspended. The British Admiralty purchased the almost-complete Almirante Latorre, which then in 1915 entered service as HMS Canada. At the outbreak of war, Almirante Cochrane was almost complete up to the forecastle, although her side armour had not yet been installed. No further work was carried out during the war until the British decided to complete her as an aircraft carrier for the Royal Navy. They purchased her from Chile on 28 February 1918 to be converted into the carrier HMS Eagle. She was the fourteenth ship of the Royal Navy to bear that name.

The Director of Naval Construction began preliminary design work even before the ship was purchased and submitted an outline design on 8 February 1918. This design had a full-length flight deck. Its most distinctive features were the two islands separated by the flight deck. Each island was to be 110 feet (33.5 m) long, containing two funnels and a tripod mast. They were staggered to make it more difficult for an enemy ship to estimate the ship's course and were to be connected to each other with heavy bracing. The bridge was to be mounted on top of this bracing which left a clear height of 20 feet (6.1 m) for the aircraft on the flight deck. There was to be a 68-foot (20.7 m) wide space between the islands where the aircraft were to be assembled before taking off. Aircraft would be transported between the hangar and the flight deck by two aircraft lifts (elevators). A crane was to be located at the aft end of each island to lift aircraft aboard and to recover seaplanes. Bulk petrol storage consisted of 15,000 imperial gallons (68,000 L; 18,000 US gal) in 2-imperial-gallon (9.1 L; 2.4 US gal) tins stowed on the forecastle deck and protected by 1-inch (25 mm) plating. Two ready-use tanks near the islands would allow aircraft on the flight deck to refuel. The ship's planned armament consisted of nine 6-inch guns and four 4-inch (102 mm) anti-aircraft guns mounted on the platform between the islands. Eagle retained the battleship's mixture of coal and fuel oil, but the quantities were increased to 3,200 long tons (3,300 t) of coal and 1,750 long tons (1,780 t) of oil, as the forward and rear 14-inch magazines and shell rooms were converted to be used as oil tanks.

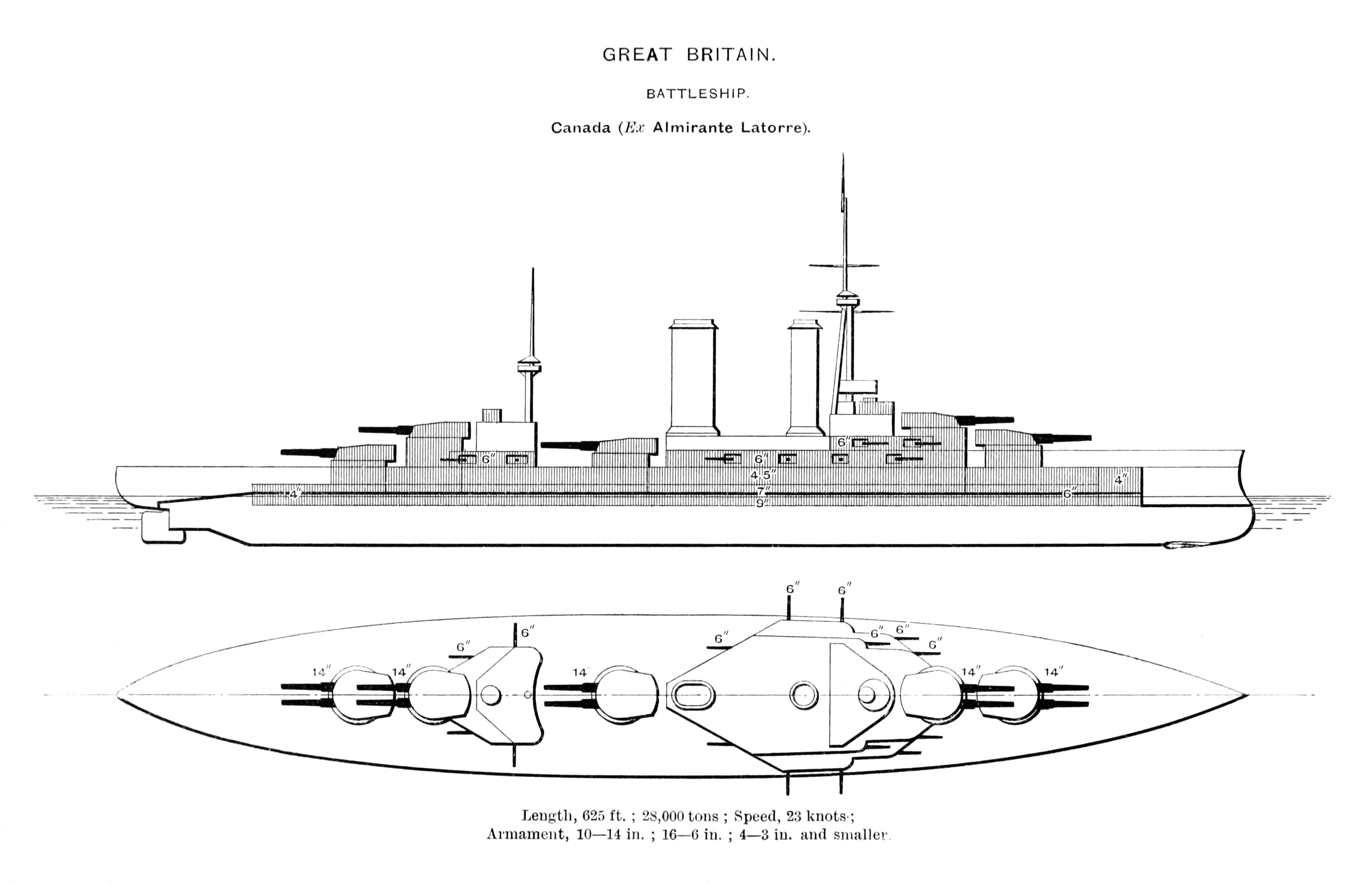
Line drawing of Almirante Latorre, illustrating what Eagle would have looked like if she had been finished in her original configuration. Shaded areas show the extent of her armour.

Based on trials with HMS Furious, in which pilots were found generally to turn to port when recovering from an aborted landing, the design was revised to eliminate the port island in April 1918. The starboard island was lengthened to 130 feet (39.6 m) and its width was reduced to 15 feet (4.6 m) to minimise air turbulence. The island contained the bridge, both funnels, and the tripod mast that carried the fire-control directors for the armament. At the request of Admiral David Beatty, commander of the Grand Fleet, the main armament was increased to 12 six-inch guns, including one mounted on the island, and eighteen torpedo tubes were added, three triple fixed mounts on each broadside, in case the ship met German light cruisers at night. The anti-aircraft armament was reduced to a single 4-inch gun mounted on the island between the funnels as Beatty believed that the ship's own fighters would be her best defence against enemy aircraft. This design was approved in June, although work had begun earlier.

The 4.5-inch (114 mm) armour planned for her upper belt was used to protect the ship's waterline. The already-completed superstructure was removed as were the barbettes for the 14-inch guns. Eagle was launched on 8 June 1918 and was towed downriver to the shipbuilder's High Walker yard for fitting-out ten days later. The boiler uptakes were re-routed and the existing openings were plated over. The existing 1.5-inch (38 mm) upper deck became the floor of the hangar deck and a new superstructure was built above it. The flight deck was 1 inch (25 mm) thick and served as the uppermost strength deck, or main supporting deck, of the ship. When the war ended in November 1918, the ship was about nine months from completion.

Construction was slowed by industrial action after the war, and was suspended on 21 October 1919 as Chile wanted to repurchase the ship and have it re-converted to a battleship. The £2.5 million cost of doing so would have been higher than the £1.5 million offered by the Chileans and the Admiralty decided to retain the ship. The Royal Navy needed to carry out flying trials with a carrier fitted with an island, and the Admiralty approved the use of Eagle on 11 November. Armstrong Whitworth plated over the openings for the undelivered lifts on the flight deck that had been cancelled when they could not meet the specifications. Armstrong Whitworth also finished the rear funnel, removed the torpedo tubes, and plated over the forward funnel uptakes. She then sailed to the Royal dockyard at Portsmouth for the modifications necessary for the trials on 20 April 1920. Only two of her boilers, converted to run on fuel oil only, could be used during the trials.

=== Flight trials ===
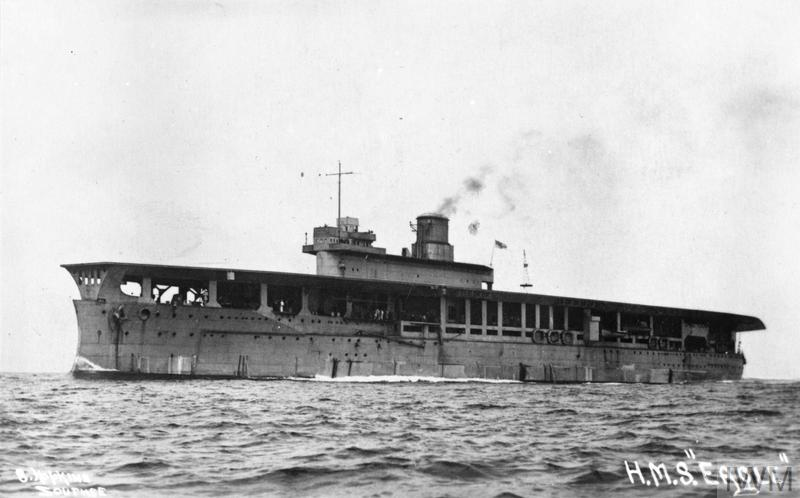
Eagle during trials

The trials principally tested the longitudinal arresting gear used previously on the small aircraft carrier Argus. They were not intended to stop landing aircraft—the landing speeds of the time were low enough that this was unnecessary given a good headwind—but rather to prevent aircraft from veering off to one side and falling off the flight deck. Initially, the arresting gear was about 170 feet (51.8 m) long and was installed too far forward. Over the course of the trials it was moved further to the rear and lengthened to a total of 320 feet (97.5 m).

The ship was commanded during the trials by Captain Wilmot Nicholson, who had previously commanded the carrier Furious in 1918, and the Royal Air Force representative was Group Captain Charles Samson. Taxiing trials began on 10 May with Sopwith Camel fighters and Parnall Panther reconnaissance aircraft while the ship was still docked. Flights over and around the ship to evaluate air currents over the flight deck and around the island began shortly afterward and the first on-board landing was made on 1 June. Larger aircraft like the Bristol F2B fighter, the Sopwith Cuckoo torpedo bomber, and the De Havilland DH.9 bomber were also evaluated during the trials. They were generally successful with only 12 minor accidents in 143 landings in all types of weather conditions, although they did reveal that aircraft landing aboard carriers would need landing gear fitted with shock absorbers to handle the impact of landing on a pitching deck. Group Captain Samson strongly preferred the elimination of the island entirely, but Nicholson recommended that the ship be retained for service, although he was not satisfied with the size and shape of the island. He also recommended that Eagle be converted to burn fuel oil exclusively and that the removal of the 6-inch guns in exchange for anti-aircraft guns would allow the tripod mast in the island to be eliminated, since it would not then be required for fire control purposes .

=== Description ===
The ship was paid off on 16 November, but did not begin construction to a revised design until 24 March 1921 at Portsmouth. The Admiralty accepted some of Nicholson's suggestions, but not all. The shape and size of the island was modified in accordance with the results from wind tunnel testing at the National Physical Laboratory, but the 6-inch guns were retained. The forward edge of the flight deck was faired into the ship's bow to smooth out the air currents over the bow and the 4-inch anti-aircraft guns were mounted on and around the island. The forward lift was moved to the forward end of the hangar. After construction began, anti-torpedo bulges were added, 6 feet (1.8 m) deep, and the petrol tin storage room was replaced by a 8,100-imperial-gallon (37,000 L; 9,700 US gal) tank. The ship's designed fuel capacity was 3,000 long tons (3,000 t), but this was increased to 3,750 long tons (3,810 t) when she was bulged. However, 500 long tons (510 t) of this amount was required to act as ballast to offset the weight of the island and its equipment.

Eagle had an overall length of 667 feet 6 inches (203.5 m), a beam of 115 feet (35.1 m), and a draught of 26 feet 8 inches (8.1 m) at deep load. She displaced 21,850 long tons (22,200 t) at standard load. Each of the ship's four sets of Brown-Curtis geared steam turbines drove one 3-bladed propeller. They were powered by 32 Yarrow small-tube boilers. During her sea trials on 9–10 September 1923, the turbines produced 52,100 shaft horsepower (38,900 kW) and gave Eagle a speed of 24.37 knots (45.13 km/h; 28.04 mph), but this caused leaks in the turbine joints and she was limited to a maximum of 50,000 shaft horsepower (37,000 kW) in service. She had a range of 4,800 nautical miles (8,900 km; 5,500 mi) at 16 knots (30 km/h; 18 mph).

The ship's flight deck was 652 feet (198.7 m) long and her hangar was 400 feet (121.9 m) long and 33 feet (10.1 m) wide. Its minimum height was 20 feet 6 inches (6.2 m), and it was equipped with four steel shutter fire curtains to isolate any fires in the hangar. The forward lift's dimensions were 46 by 47 feet (14.0 m × 14.3 m) and the aft lift was 46 by 33 feet (14.0 m × 10.1 m). The fore-and-aft arresting gear was 328 feet (100.0 m) long and extended the length of the flight deck between the edges of the lifts. A large crane with a 60-foot (18.3 m) radius was positioned behind the island. The ship's aircraft capacity was 25 to 30 and, in 1939, the ship's crew totalled 41 officers and 750 men, exclusive of the air group.

For self-defence against enemy warships, Eagle had nine BL Mk XVII 6-inch guns, three at the stern and six along both sides of the ship. The ship carried 200 rounds per gun. Two of her five QF Mk V 4-inch AA guns were positioned on the flight deck in front of the island while a third was behind the island. The remaining two guns were mounted on top of the island, one between the two funnels, and each gun was provided with 150 rounds.

== Career ==
=== Inter-war ===
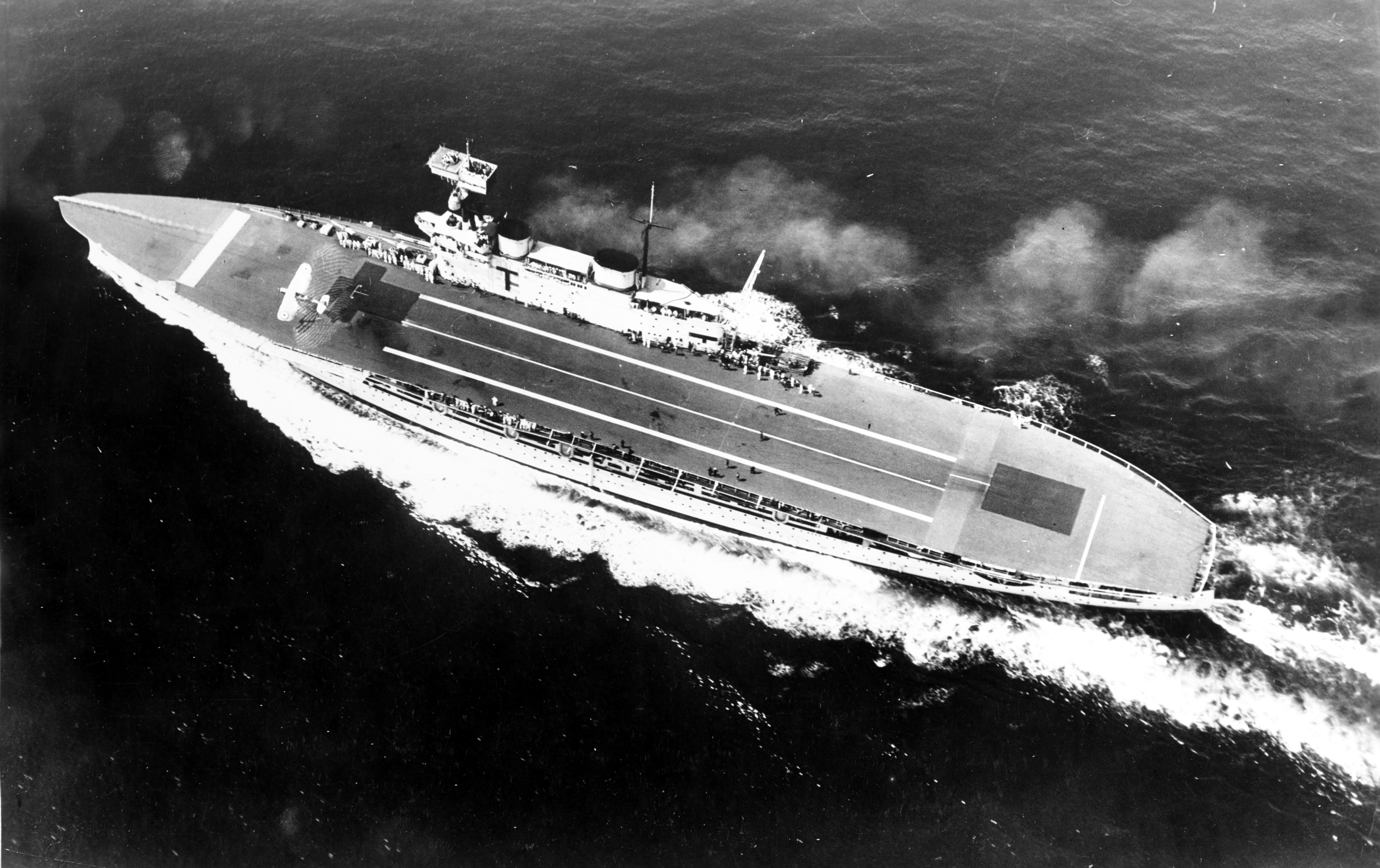
Aerial view of Eagle in 1931, prior to her refit

Eagle was assigned to the Mediterranean Fleet on 7 June 1924 after she commissioned on 26 February and finished working up. She was the largest aircraft carrier in the world at the time and embarked 24 aircraft in four six-aircraft flights of the Fleet Air Arm of the Royal Air Force. These consisted of No. 402 Flight with Fairey Flycatchers, No. 422 Flight with Blackburn Blackburn reconnaissance aircraft, No. 440 Flight (Supermarine Seagull flying boats) and No. 460 Flight with Blackburn Dart torpedo bombers.

While in the Mediterranean, one flight usually operated ashore at either RAF Hal Far in Malta, or Aboukir in Egypt. The Seagulls proved to be unsatisfactory in service and they were replaced by Fairey IIIDs in January 1925. Avro Bison spotters of No. 421B Flight operated aboard for a time in late 1925. Eagle sailed for Devonport at the end of 1925 for a brief refit where the longitudinal arresting gear was removed as it had been found to be virtually useless in service. Two single QF 2-pounder pom-pom light anti-aircraft guns were added forward of the 4-inch guns on the flight deck in front of the island and the ship's petrol capacity was increased to 14,190 imperial gallons (64,500 L; 17,040 US gal).

When the ship returned to the Mediterranean after the completion of her refit in 1926, the Bisons of No. 448 Flight replaced No. 422 Flight. In 1928 she was joined by HMS Courageous which allowed the fleet to experiment with multi-carrier operations. Eagle was refitted again in early 1929 and a salt-water spray system was fitted to fight hangar fires. On 29 June 1929, she rescued Major Ramón Franco of the Spanish Air Force – brother of future Spanish dictator Francisco Franco – and his crew, who had been adrift in the North Atlantic Ocean since 22 June when their flying boat, the Dornier Do J Wal ("Whale") Numancia was forced down due to fuel exhaustion on the first leg of an attempt to fly westward around the world.

When Eagle returned to the Mediterranean later in the year, both 440 and 448 Flights had re-equipped with Fairey IIIF reconnaissance aircraft. Eagle departed Malta on 8 January 1931, en route to Portsmouth to load the latest carrier aircraft for a demonstration at the British Industries Exhibition at Buenos Aires, Argentina. She returned to the Mediterranean to participate in the summer fleet exercises before sailing for Devonport where she began a lengthy refit in August.

The ship's boilers were replaced during the refit and the 4-inch gun between the funnels was replaced by an eight-barrel QF 2-pounder Mark V pom-pom mount. A single quadruple Vickers .50 machine gun mount was added on the starboard aft side of the flight deck. Four fire-fighting foam generators were also fitted on the flight deck. A single High Angle Control System (HACS) director was fitted on the aft end of the control top on the tripod mast. The crew, now numbering 753 sailors and 253 airmen, benefited from improved accommodation. The refit was completed on 28 November 1932, but personnel shortages prevented her from working up until April 1933.

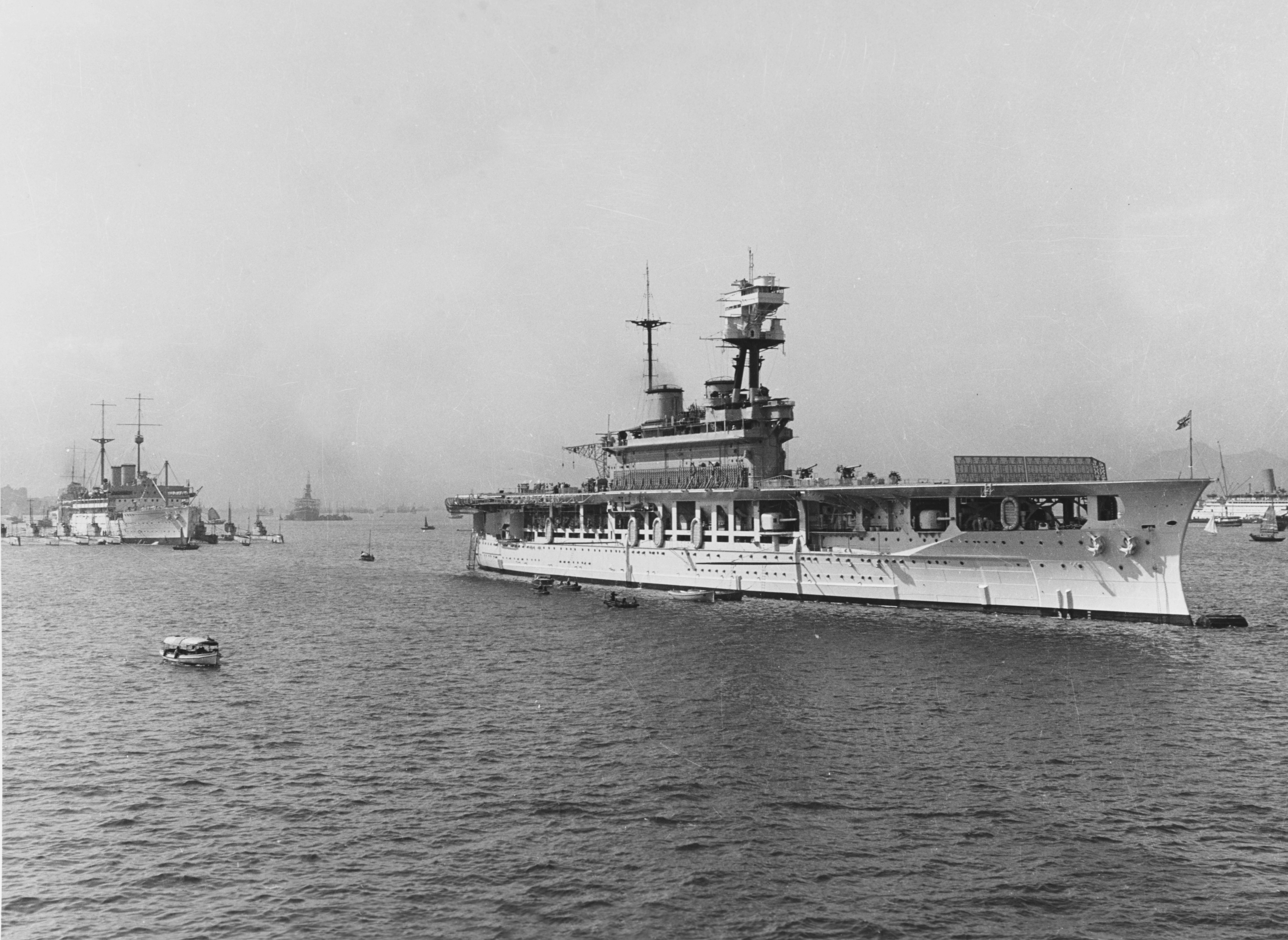
Eagle at Hong Kong in the 1930s. The depot ship HMS Medway is in the background

Following the refit, Eagle was sent to the Far East, serving on the China Station throughout 1934, with her aircraft being deployed against pirate ships and their bases. The tropical heat caused problems in cooling the bomb magazines, and the food storage rooms and the ventilation proved to be barely satisfactory. Another quadruple .50 machine gun mount was added forward of the 2-pounder gun on the flight deck and the original mounting was shifted over to the port side. During this time, the ship's air group comprised nine Hawker Osprey fighters of 803 Squadron and 12 Fairey IIIFs of 824 Squadron; the latter unit was re-designated as 825 Squadron in October 1934. 803 Squadron transferred to HMS Hermes when she relieved Eagle at the end of 1934. They were replaced by Blackburn Baffin torpedo bombers of 812 Squadron when Eagle arrived in the Mediterranean in February 1935. Both squadrons remained behind at RAF Hal Far when the ship sailed for Devonport for another refit in June.

Eagle was paid off until her refit began in early 1936. Transverse arresting gear was installed and a second octuple pom-pom replaced the 2-pounders in front of the island. Two more quadruple .50 machine gun mounts were installed in sponsons on either side of the bow. The capacity of her bomb magazines was also increased during this refit, and the ship's ventilation and insulation arrangements were improved as well. She was sent back to the Far East in 1937 with only nine Fairey Swordfish torpedo bombers (cloth-covered biplanes) of 813 Squadron aboard as well as nine more Swordfish to re-equip 824 Squadron when it transferred from Hermes in April. Captain Clement Moody commanded Eagle from 1 January 1937 until relieved by Captain A. R. M. Bridge on 16 June 1939. In August 1939 the ship's crew was exchanged in Hong Kong and Eagle sailed for Singapore to begin a short refit on 12 August.

=== World War II ===
==== 1939–1941 ====
When World War II began the following month, the ship had just completed her refit in Singapore. She put to sea a few days later and began searching for German merchant ships in company with the light cruiser Birmingham and escorted by the destroyer Daring. A Swordfish discovered the cargo ship Franken south of the port of Padang on Sumatra and Birmingham was ordered to intercept it while Eagle continued her air patrols. She arrived at Colombo in Ceylon on 10 September and until 5 October she searched the Indian Ocean for German ships between the west coast of India and the Maldive Islands with the light cruiser Liverpool. Eagle was then assigned to Force I together with the heavy cruisers Cornwall and Dorsetshire, to search the Indian Ocean for the pocket battleship Admiral Graf Spee and other German commerce raiders. In mid-December her boilers and bottom were cleaned during a period of maintenance in Durban, South Africa.

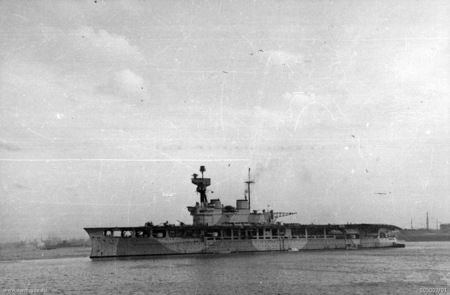
Eagle in Alexandria harbour, December 1940

Eagle continued to patrol the Indian Ocean in 1940, but escorted a large Australian troop convoy to Suez early in the year. While in the vicinity of the Nicobar Islands on 14 March, a 250 lb (110 kg) bomb accidentally exploded, killing 14 men. The damage to the ship was mostly confined to the bomb magazines, although two generators were knocked out. The explosion flashed upwards through the port bomb lift and ignited the wing on one Swordfish stowed in the hangar. All but four of the aircraft were damaged by the corrosive salt-water spray system when the fire was doused. She was repaired at Singapore between 15 March and 9 May when the ship sailed for Colombo en route to the Mediterranean, which she reached on 26 May. In June three crated Gloster Sea Gladiators were found in storage at Dekheila and these aircraft became the only fighters available for the entire fleet in the Eastern Mediterranean.

Flying from shore bases on 5 July, 813 Squadron attacked Tobruk harbour in a combined attack with the RAF at dusk, sinking the Zeffiro and the cargo ship Manzoni, and blowing the bow off the destroyer Euro. Two other merchantmen had to be beached before they sank. During the Battle of Calabria on 9 July, 813 Squadron was used to search and track the Italian fleet while 824 Squadron made two unsuccessful attacks on Italian cruisers without loss. On the evening of 10 July, Eagle's aircraft attacked Augusta harbour in Sicily, sinking the destroyer Leone Pancaldo. While under heavy aerial attack on 13 July, pilots of the Sea Gladiator Flight shot down three Italian bombers. On the night of 20 July, six aircraft from 824 Squadron, flying from Sidi Barrani, sank the destroyers Nembo and Ostro as well as the cargo ship Sereno. While providing distant cover to a convoy bound for Greece, one Savoia-Marchetti SM.79 medium bomber was shot down on 29 July by Eagle's Sea Gladiators while attacking the fleet.

On 22 August three Swordfish from 824 Squadron, flying from Sidi Barrani, attacked and sank the Italian submarine Iride and the depot ship Monte Gargano in the Gulf of Bomba. The ships were carrying eight frogmen and four manned torpedoes to attack British shipping in Alexandria harbour. In September, she was joined by the carrier Illustrious and both ships attacked Italian airbases on Rhodes on 9 September. Eagle's 12 Swordfish were late in taking off and attacked the airfield at Maritza after the Italians had been alerted by the earlier attack by Illustrious' aircraft on the nearby airbase at Calato. Four aircraft were shot down by the defending Fiat CR.32 and Fiat CR.42 Falco fighters, but two SM.79s were destroyed on the ground and four other aircraft were damaged. These losses were the ship's heaviest in any single mission of the war.

While covering another convoy to Malta on 12 October, she was damaged by near misses from SM.79s based in Sicily. The damage to her aviation fuel system was not immediately apparent and she covered another convoy later that month. While returning to Alexandria, her aircraft attacked Maltezana seaplane base on Rhodes on 27 October. Four of her Swordfish from 824 Squadron had been disembarked earlier and were flown to Fuka Landing Ground for a night attack on Tobruk harbour. The 824 Squadron aircraft distracted the defences with 250-pound bombs, while the 12 other Swordfish laid mines. On 28 October, Eagle and the rest of the Mediterranean Fleet patrolled off the west coast of Greece for a few days hoping to intercept the Italian Navy if it supported the Italian Army in their invasion of Greece, but no contact was made.

When the ship was examined on 5 November, her aviation fuel system was leaking and required repairs. Five of her aircraft were transferred to Illustrious for an attack on 11 November at the Battle of Taranto (Operation Judgement), whilst Eagle remained in Alexandria. One of Eagle's Swordfish was shot down by the intense Italian anti-aircraft fire. The ship covered multiple convoys to Greece and Malta during the rest of November. Six of her aircraft bombed Tripoli harbour during the night of 24/25 November without loss. Eagle spent most of December in Alexandria, but her aircraft supported the ground war, most notably when they spotted for the battleships Warspite and Barham during the bombardment of Bardia on 2 January 1941. In mid-January, the ship covered a convoy to Greece, but bad weather foiled plans to attack Italian bases en route. After her return, her aircraft complement was reorganised to include more fighters, as Eagle now had sole responsibility for fighter cover over the fleet after the crippling of Illustrious by German dive bombers on 11 January. In order to make room for the fighters, one of the Swordfish squadrons was disembarked and used to support the ground war. When Eagle was covering another convoy to Malta in mid-February, the ship carried nine Fairey Fulmars of 805 Naval Air Squadron, five Sea Gladiators and six Swordfish.

After the carrier Formidable arrived on 9 March to relieve Illustrious, orders were cancelled that would have transferred Eagle to the South Atlantic to hunt for German commerce raiders and the ship did not leave Alexandria until 9 April. In the meantime, both Swordfish squadrons were transferred to Port Sudan to operate against Italian shipping in Massawa, in Italian East Africa, on 25 March. They were very successful and returned to the ship on 13 April after she had passed through the Suez Canal. After she reached Mombasa in Kenya, on 26 April, she was ordered to sea on 29 April on an unsuccessful search for a raider in the Indian Ocean. The ship was then ordered on 1 May to proceed to Durban, South Africa, to rendezvous with the battleship Nelson and to proceed to Gibraltar. After the two ships arrived at Freetown in Sierra Leone on 25 May to refuel, Nelson was ordered to continue to Gibraltar, but Eagle's orders changed and she was now charged with hunting for German supply ships in the South Atlantic. Captain A. R. M. Bridge was relieved by E. G. H. Rushbrooke at this time.

Eagle began searching the South Atlantic on 29 May, usually accompanied by Dorsetshire or the light cruiser Dunedin. The carrier's Swordfish discovered, bombed and sank the blockade runner Elbe on 6 June. The oil tanker Lothringen was captured on 15 June by Dunedin after it had been bombed and strafed by several Swordfish. The ship continued patrolling without incident except for a hangar fire that killed one aircraft mechanic on 20 September. All but four of the ship's Swordfish were damaged by the spray used to put out the fire, but the ship herself was undamaged.

In October 1941, Eagle was ordered to return to Britain for a refit at Gladstone Dock in Liverpool. She arrived off Greenock on 26 October and was docked at Liverpool on 1 November. The quadruple .50 machine guns were replaced by 12 manually operated automatic 20 mm Oerlikon light anti-aircraft guns, six in sponsons on each side of the flight deck, and the crews of the four-inch AA guns were given protection from splinters by the addition of zarebas around each weapon. The HACS was moved to the front of the control top and fitted with a Type 285 gunnery radar. A Type 290 air warning radar was also installed. The ship's oil fuel capacity was reduced to 2,990 long tons (3,040 t) in exchange for an increase in her petrol storage of 3,000 imperial gallons (14,000 L; 3,600 US gal). This reduced her range to 2,780 nautical miles (5,150 km; 3,200 mi) at a speed of 17.5 knots (32.4 km/h; 20.1 mph).

Eagle's refit was completed on 9 January 1942 and she was working up for the next five weeks. She joined the convoy WS16 en route to Gibraltar on 16 February and reached it a week later. 813 and 824 Squadrons had rejoined the ship with their Swordfish and they were supplemented by four Sea Hurricane 1B fighters from a detachment of 804 Squadron and the Fighter Flight of 813 Squadron. Because their wings could not fold, they could not use either lift and remained on the flight deck at all times. The ship reached Gibraltar on 23 February and was assigned to Force H.

==== Battle of Malta ====
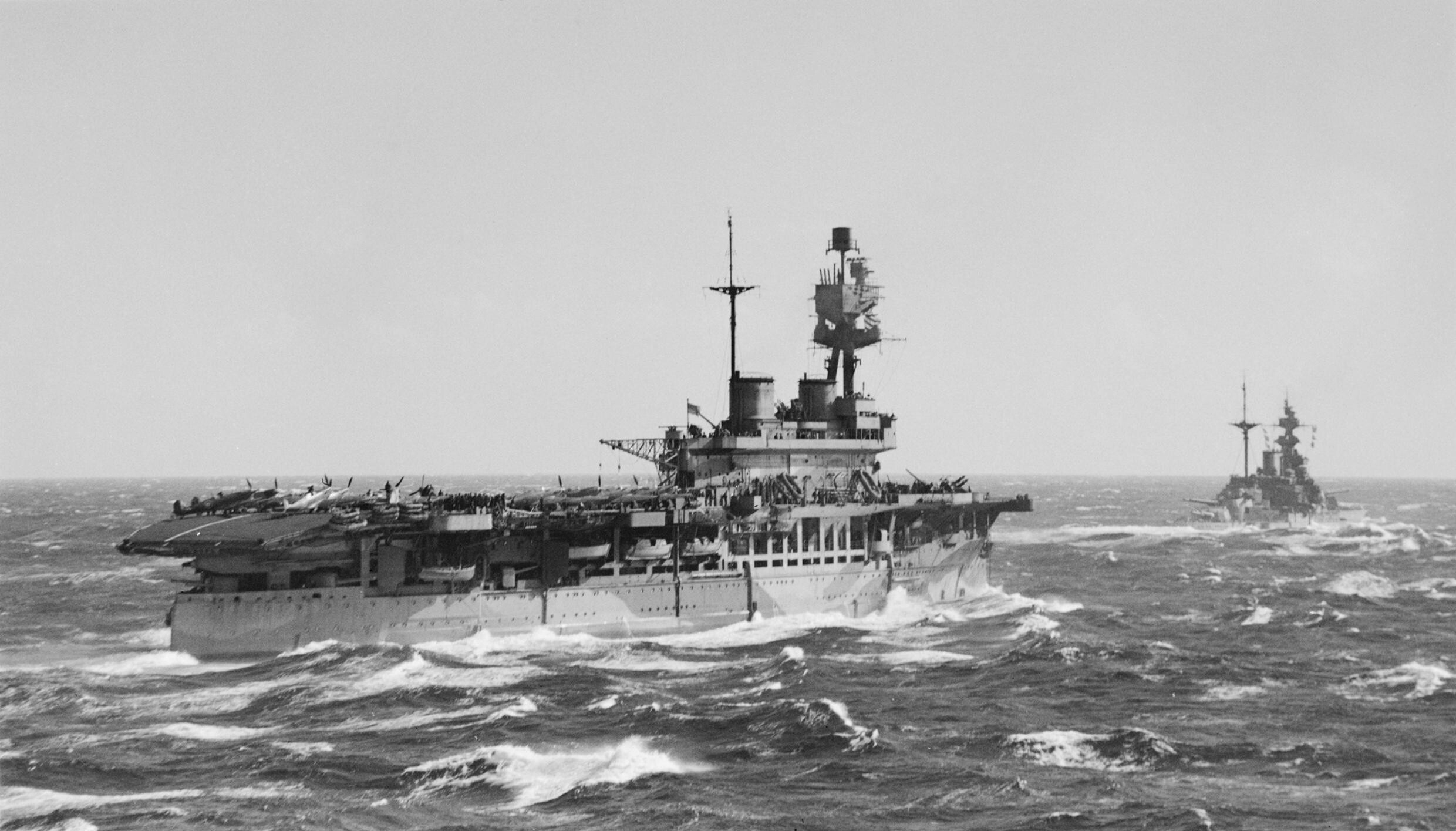
Eagle and Malaya, taken from Argus, serving with Force H in the Mediterranean, 7 March 1942

Upon Eagle's arrival in Gibraltar, 824 Naval Air Squadron transferred to RAF North Front and the ship loaded 15 Supermarine Spitfire fighters brought to Gibraltar by the carrier Argus. These aircraft were partly assembled dockside and hoisted aboard for final assembly. They were too big to fit below deck and remained on the flight deck, where they impeded the operations of Eagle's aircraft, except for those few also carried on the flight deck, until the ferried aircraft were flown off. On 27 February 1942, she sailed to deliver the Spitfires to Malta, escorted by the battleship Malaya, Argus, the cruiser Hermione, and nine destroyers, but the operation had to be cancelled when the long-range fuel tanks of the Spitfires proved defective. The problems were not rectified until 7 March, when the 15 Spitfires were flown off to Malta. Upon her return, the ship's engines required repairs that lasted until 13 March. Nine more Spitfires were delivered to Malta on 21 March and seven on 29 March. After her return, her steering gear required extensive repairs that lasted until the end of April.

As part of Operation Bowery, Eagle rendezvoused on the night of 7/8 May with the American carrier USS Wasp, carrying 47 Spitfires, while Eagle had disembarked her aircraft complement to make room for 17 Spitfires of her own. Sixty of them arrived safely at Malta. For the next operation on 17 May, the Swordfish and Sea Hurricanes of 813 Naval Air Squadron (NAS) flew back on board to join the 17 Spitfires and six Fairey Albacore torpedo bombers destined for Malta. The fighters flew off without incident but engine problems forced all of the Albacores to return. After they had landed, the ship was attacked by six SM.79 torpedo bombers which failed to score any hits. The radar-guided guns of the escorting light cruiser, HMS Charybdis, were instrumental in driving off the determined Italian aircraft.

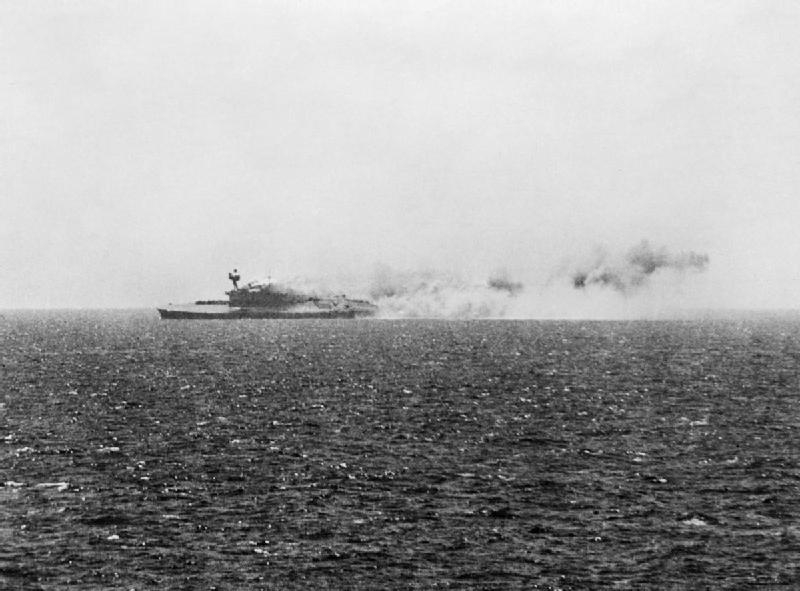
Eagle listing to port and sinking, 11 August 1942

Eagle disembarked all of her aircraft, except for her four Sea Hurricanes, to make room for 31 Spitfires and flew them off on 3 June during Operation Style. Another 32 were flown off on 9 June during Operation Salient. Later in the month, the ship provided air cover for another convoy, Operation Harpoon, which departed for Malta at the same time as the Operation Vigorous convoy did, from the opposite direction. A dozen Sea Hurricanes of 801 Naval Air Squadron and four Fulmars from 807 Naval Air Squadron reinforced the four Sea Hurricanes of the 813 NAS Fighter Flight to deal with the heavy air attacks anticipated. The convoy was subject to heavy air attacks by both the German and Italian Air Forces; Eagle's Sea Hurricanes managed to disrupt many attacks, claiming nine aircraft destroyed and a further two probably destroyed for the loss of one Sea Hurricane from 813 Squadron and three Fulmars. The escorts reached Gibraltar on 17 June and did not make the next delivery of aircraft until 14 July when 32 Spitfires were flown off to Malta (Operation Pinpoint). During this time, the carrier's aircraft complement consisted solely of six Sea Hurricanes of 801 Naval Air Squadron. Another 29 Spitfires as well as four Swordfish of 824 Naval Air Squadron were loaded on 20 July and the Spitfires were flown off the following day. Earlier in the day, the ship was unsuccessfully attacked by the Italian submarine Dandolo.

Eagle covered Operation Pedestal together with the carriers Victorious and Indomitable. Eagle carried 16 Sea Hurricanes of 801 NAS and 813 NAS as well as four reserve aircraft for the operation. On the early afternoon of 11 August, Eagle was hit by four torpedoes from the U-73, commanded by Helmut Rosenbaum, and sank within four minutes, 70 nautical miles (130 km; 81 mi) south of Cape Salinas at position 38°3′0″N 3°1′12″E; Cape Salinas is the southernmost point of Mallorca. Losses in the sinking included 131 officers and ratings, mainly from the ship's propulsion machinery spaces. Four Sea Hurricanes from 801 NAS were aloft when the ship was torpedoed, and they landed on other carriers; the remaining sixteen went down with the ship. The destroyers Laforey and Lookout and the tug Jaunty rescued 67 officers and 862 sailors.
