= HMS Renown (1916) =

1916 Renown-class battlecruiser of the Royal Navy

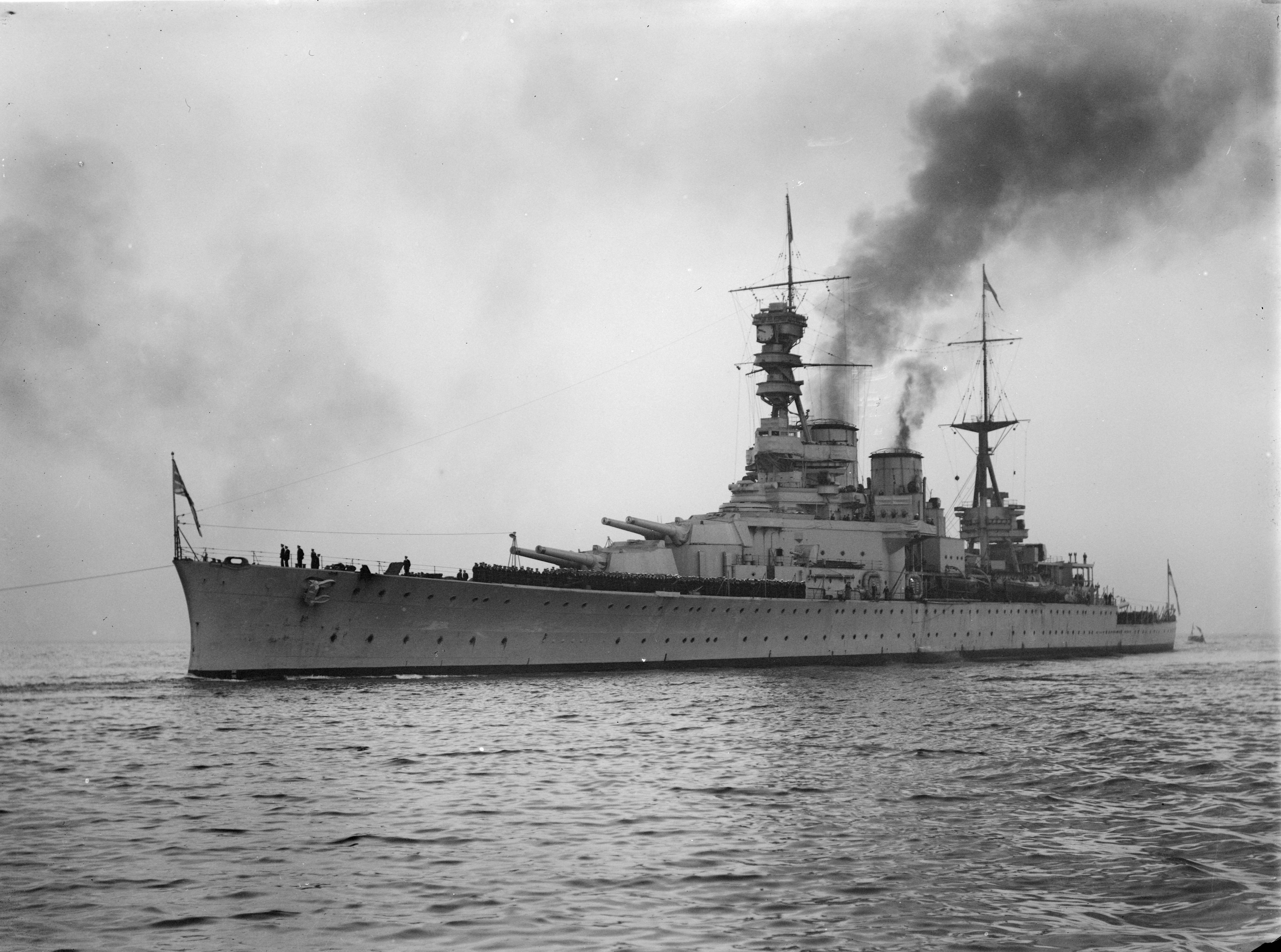
- Renown in May 1920

History

United Kingdom
- Name: Renown
- Ordered: 30 December 1914
- Builder: Fairfield, Govan, Glasgow, Scotland
- Cost: £3,117,204
- Laid down: 25 January 1915
- Launched: 4 March 1916
- Commissioned: 20 September 1916
- Stricken: 1948
- Identification: Pennant number: 72
- Motto: Antiquae Famae Custos; "Guardians of Ancient Renown"
- Nickname(s): Refit
- Fate: Sold for scrap, 19 March 1948

General characteristics (as built)
- Class & type: Renown-class battlecruiser
- Displacement: 27,200 long tons (27,600 t) (normal); 32,220 long tons (32,740 t) (deep load)
- Length: 750 ft 2 in (228.7 m) (p.p.); 794 ft 1.5 in (242.0 m) (o.a.)
- Beam: 90 ft 1.75 in (27.5 m)
- Draught: 27 ft (8.2 m)
- Installed power: 42 × water-tube boilers; 112,000 shp (84,000 kW)
- Propulsion: 4 × shafts, 2 × geared steam turbine sets
- Speed: 32 knots (59 km/h; 37 mph)
- Range: 4,000 nmi (7,400 km; 4,600 mi) at 18 knots (33 km/h; 21 mph)
- Crew: 953; 1223 (1919)
- Armament: 3 × twin 15 in (381 mm) guns; 5 × triple, 2 × single 4 in (102 mm) guns; 2 × single 3 in (76 mm) AA guns; 2 × 21 in (533 mm) torpedo tubes
- Armour: Belt: 3–6 in (76–152 mm); Decks: 1–2.5 in (25–64 mm); Barbettes: 4–7 in (102–178 mm); Gun turrets: 7–9 in (178–229 mm); Conning tower: 10 in (254 mm); Bulkheads: 3–4 in (76–102 mm)

General characteristics (1939)
- Displacement: 36,080 long tons (36,660 t) (deep load)
- Length: 794 ft (242.0 m)
- Beam: 90 ft (27.4 m)
- Draught: 31 ft 9 in (9.7 m)
- Installed power: 8 × boilers; 120,000 shaft horsepower (89,000 kW)
- Propulsion: 4 × shafts; 4 × geared steam turbines
- Speed: 31 knots (57 km/h; 36 mph)
- Range: 6,580 mi (10,590 km) at 18 knots (33 km/h; 21 mph)
- Complement: 1,200
- Armament: 3 × twin 15 in (381 mm) guns; 10 × twin 4.5 in (114 mm) DP guns; 3 × octuple 2-pdr (40 mm) AA guns
- Armour: Belt: 3–9 in (76–229 mm); Decks: 1–5 in (25–127 mm); Barbettes: 4–7 in (102–178 mm); Gun turrets: 7–9 in (178–229 mm); Conning tower: 10 in (254 mm); Bulkheads: 3–4 in (76–102 mm)
- Aircraft carried: 4 × floatplanes
- Aviation facilities: 1 × aircraft catapult

HMS Renown was the lead ship of her class of battlecruisers of the Royal Navy built during the First World War. She was originally laid down as an improved version of the Revenge-class battleships. Her construction was suspended on the outbreak of war on the grounds she would not be ready in time. Admiral Lord Fisher, upon becoming First Sea Lord, gained approval to restart her construction as a battlecruiser that could be built and enter service quickly. The Director of Naval Construction (DNC), Eustace Tennyson-d'Eyncourt, quickly produced a new design to meet Fisher's requirements and the builders agreed to deliver the ships in 15 months. They did not quite meet that ambitious goal but the ship was delivered a few months after the Battle of Jutland in 1916. Renown, and her sister HMS Repulse, were the world's fastest capital ships upon completion.

Renown did not see action during the war and was reconstructed twice between the wars; the 1920s reconstruction increased her armour protection and made other more minor improvements; the 1930s reconstruction was much more thorough. The ship frequently conveyed royalty on their foreign tours and served as flagship of the Battlecruiser Squadron when Hood was refitting.

During the Second World War, Renown was involved in the search for the Admiral Graf Spee in 1939, participated in the Norwegian campaign of April–June 1940 and the search for the Bismarck in 1941. She spent much of 1940 and 1941 assigned to Force H at Gibraltar, escorting convoys and she participated in the inconclusive Battle of Cape Spartivento. Renown was briefly assigned to the Home Fleet and provided cover to several Arctic convoys in early 1942. The ship was transferred back to Force H for Operation Torch and spent much of 1943 refitting or transporting Winston Churchill and his staff to and from various conferences with various Allied leaders. In early 1944, Renown was transferred to the Eastern Fleet in the Indian Ocean where she supported numerous attacks on Japanese-occupied facilities in Indonesia and various island groups in the Indian Ocean. The ship returned to the Home Fleet in early 1945 and was refitted before being placed in reserve after the end of the war. Renown was sold for scrap in 1948.

== Design and description ==
Admiral Lord Fisher first presented his requirements for the new ships to the Director of Naval Construction (DNC) on 18 December 1914, before the ships had even been approved. He wanted a long, high, flared bow, like that on the pre-dreadnought HMS Renown, but higher, four 15-inch guns in two twin turrets, an anti-torpedo boat armament of twenty 4-inch (102 mm) guns mounted high up and protected by gun shields only, speed of 32 knots using oil fuel, and armour on the scale of the battlecruiser Indefatigable. Within a few days, however, Fisher increased the number of guns to six and added two torpedo tubes. Minor revisions in the initial estimate were made until 26 December and a preliminary design was completed on 30 December.

During the following week the DNC's department examined the material delivered for the two battleships and decided what could be used in the new design. The usable material was transferred to the builders, who had received enough information from the DNC's department to lay the keels of both ships on 25 January 1915, well before the altered contracts were completed on 10 March.

Renown had an overall length of 794 feet 1.5 inches (242.0 m), a beam of 90 feet 1.75 inches (27.5 m), and a maximum draught of 30 feet 2 inches (9.2 m). She displaced 27,320 long tons (27,760 t) at normal load and 32,220 long tons (32,740 t) at deep load. Her Brown-Curtis direct-drive steam turbines were designed to produce 112,000 shaft horsepower (84,000 kW), which would propel the ship at 32 knots (59 km/h; 37 mph). However, during trials in 1916, Renown's turbines provided 126,000 shp (94,000 kW), allowing her to reach a speed of 32.58 knots (60.34 km/h; 37.49 mph). The ship normally carried 1,000 long tons (1,016 t) of fuel oil, but had a maximum capacity of 4,289 long tons (4,358 t). At full capacity, she could steam at a speed of 18 knots (33 km/h; 21 mph) for 4,000 nautical miles (7,410 km; 4,600 mi).

The ship mounted six 42-calibre BL 15-inch Mk I guns in three twin hydraulically powered turrets, designated 'A', 'B', and 'Y' from front to rear. Her secondary armament consisted of 17 BL 4-inch Mark IX guns, fitted in five triple and two single mounts. Renown mounted a pair of QF 3 inch 20 cwt (Note: "cwt" is the abbreviation for hundredweight, 30 cwt referring to the weight of the gun.) anti-aircraft guns mounted on the shelter deck abreast the rear funnel. She mounted two submerged tubes for 21-inch (533 mm) torpedoes, one on each side forward of 'A' barbette.

Renown's waterline belt of Krupp cemented armour measured 6 inches (152 mm) thick amidships. Her gun turrets were 7–9 inches (178–229 mm) thick with roofs 4.25 inches (108 mm) thick. As designed the high-tensile-steel decks ranged from 0.75 to 1.5 inches (19 to 38 mm) in thickness. After the Battle of Jutland in 1916, while the ship was still completing, an extra inch of high-tensile steel was added on the main deck over the magazines. Renown was fitted with a shallow anti-torpedo bulge integral to the hull which was intended to explode the torpedo before it hit the hull proper and vent the underwater explosion to the surface rather than into the ship.

Despite these additions, the ship was still felt to be too vulnerable to plunging fire and Renown was refitted in Rosyth between 1 February and mid-April 1917 with additional horizontal armour, weighing approximately 504 long tons (512 t), added to the decks over the magazines and over the steering gear. Flying-off platforms were fitted on 'B' and 'X' turrets in early 1918. One fighter and a reconnaissance aircraft were carried.

== Construction and service ==
=== 1916–1925 ===
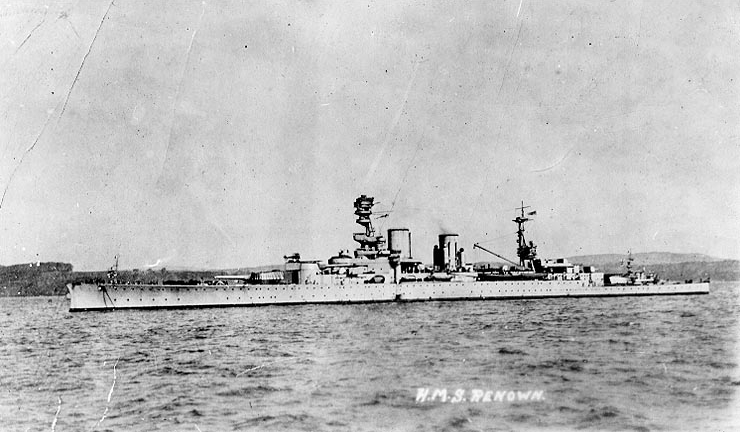
Renown with an aircraft atop 'B' turret, 1918

Renown was laid down by Fairfield at Govan, Glasgow, Scotland, on 25 January 1915. The ship was launched on 4 March 1916 and completed on 20 September 1916, after the Battle of Jutland at the cost of £3,117,204. She served with the Grand Fleet in the North Sea during the remaining two years of the First World War. Renown was assigned to the 1st Battlecruiser Squadron for the duration of the war, but never fired a shot in anger during the war. On 12 December 1917 Renown put to sea with other elements of the fleet in an unsuccessful attempt to intercept the German 3rd Half-Flotilla of destroyers that had destroyed a Scandinavian convoy and most of its escorts off the coast of Norway. For the rest of the war the ships patrolled the North Sea uneventfully. Both Renown and Repulse were present at the surrender of the High Seas Fleet at Scapa Flow on 21 November 1918.

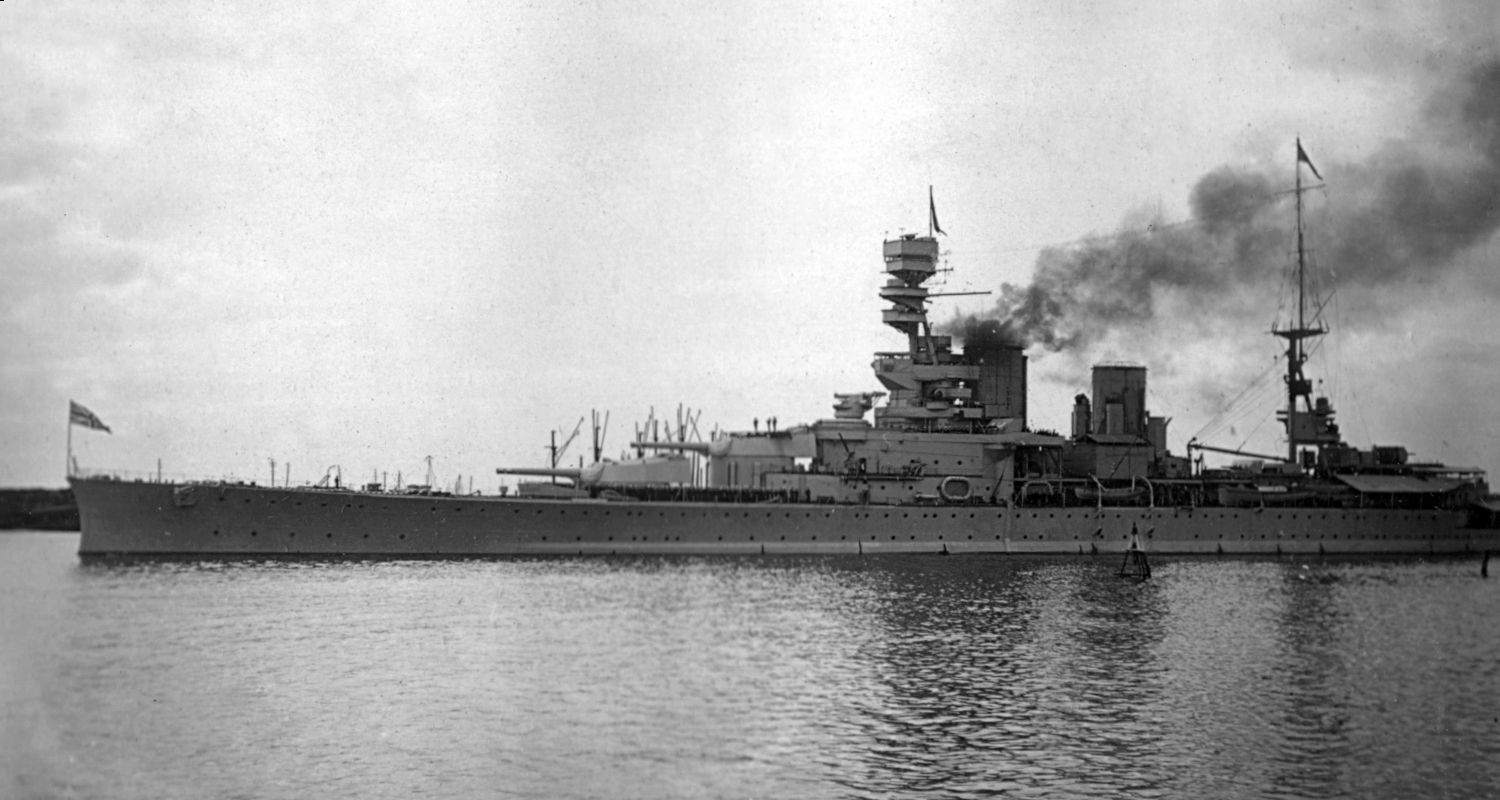
Renown in Fremantle, Western Australia, carrying the Duke and Duchess of York back to England in 1927

When the Grand Fleet was disbanded in April 1919, Renown was assigned to the Battlecruiser Squadron of the Atlantic Fleet. In June she was refitted in preparation for a tour of Canada, Newfoundland and the United States by Edward, Prince of Wales, and both flying-off platforms were removed. A 30-foot (9.1 m) rangefinder replaced the 15-foot (4.6 m) model in 'Y' turret and a 20-foot (6.1 m) rangefinder was added to the armoured hood over the conning tower. From January to March 1920 Renown was refitted more extensively as a "royal yacht". Her aft 4-inch mounting and both 3-inch AA guns were removed so that extra accommodation and a promenade deck could be built. A large deck house was built on the shelter deck between the funnels. The port side housed a squash court while the starboard side was a cinema. The ship sailed in March for Australia and New Zealand with the Prince of Wales and his entourage aboard and made many stops en route. She returned to Portsmouth in October and was placed in reserve in November.

Renown was recommissioned in September 1921 for a tour of India, the Philippines and Japan by the Prince of Wales and sailed from Portsmouth in October. The ship arrived back in Portsmouth in June 1922 and she was placed in reserve the following month. The ship began a reconstruction that same month along the lines of her sister, although changes were made based on the experiences with Repulse. Renown's main armour belt was removed and a new 9-inch belt was installed, using up the remaining plates made surplus by the conversion of the battleship Almirante Cochrane (originally ordered by Chile and purchased after the war began) to the aircraft carrier HMS Eagle as well as new armour, but installed about 3 feet (0.9 m) higher than on Repulse to offset any increase in draught. A strake of tapered armour was fitted underneath the main belt to deflect any shell that dived beneath the water's surface; it was 9-inches thick at top and thinned to 2 inches (51 mm) at the bottom. The ship's deck armour was heavily reinforced adjacent to its machinery spaces and magazines. Two longitudinal bulkheads were added between the upper and main decks that ran from the base of the conning tower to the end of the boiler rooms. The bulges were reworked and based on those used in the Queen Elizabeth-class battleships although crushing tubes were only used abreast the magazines. The rear triple 4-inch gun mount was replaced. The flying-off platform on 'B' turret was reinstated and a high-angle control position (HACP) was added to the fore-top. The pair of 3-inch AA guns and her two single four-inch gun mounts were replaced with four QF four-inch Mark V anti-aircraft guns. They had a maximum depression of -5° and a maximum elevation of 80°. They fired a 31-pound (14 kg) high explosive shell at a muzzle velocity of 2,387 ft/s (728 m/s) at a rate of ten to fifteen rounds per minute. The guns had a maximum ceiling of 31,000 ft (9,400 m), but an effective range of much less. The reconstruction only added 3,500 long tons (3,600 t) to the ship's displacement and three inches to her draught. This reconstruction cost £979,927.

=== 1926–1939 ===
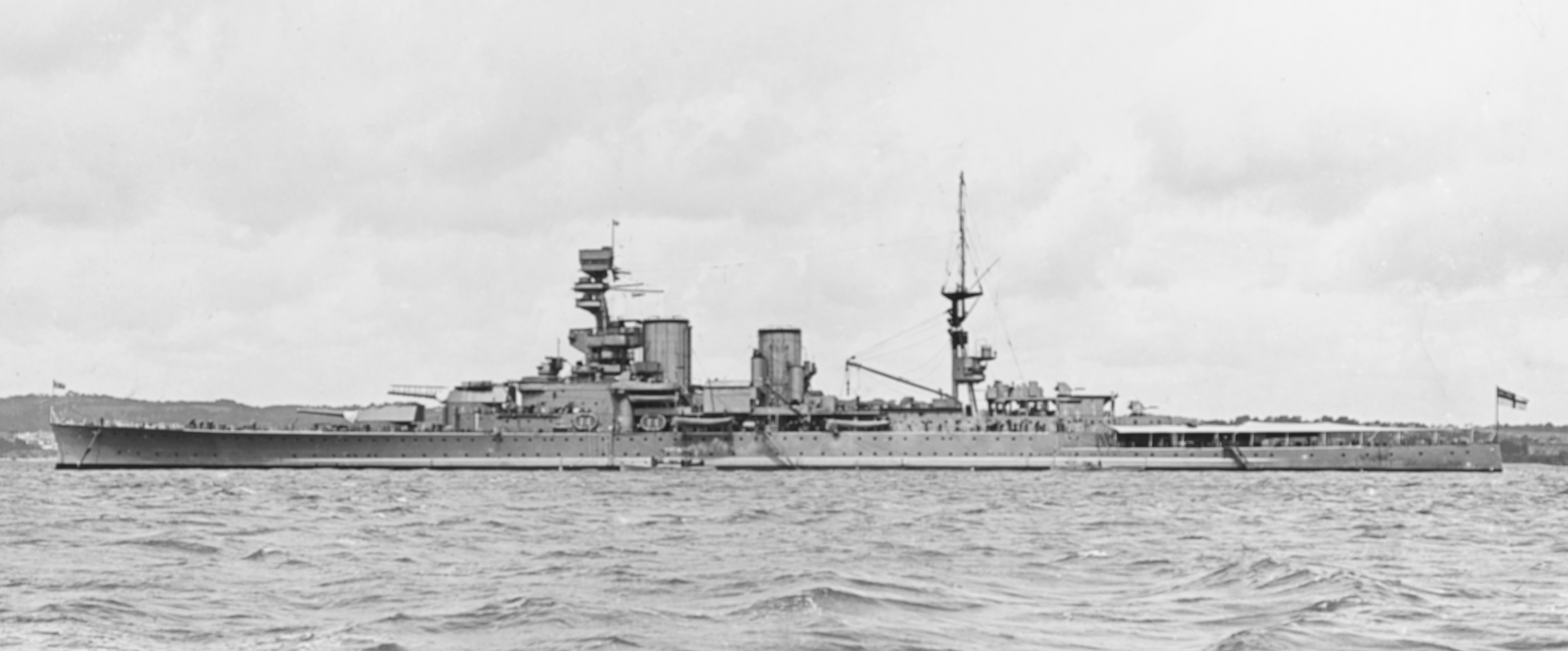
Renown following her reconstruction, 1928

Renown finished her reconstruction in September 1926 and she was assigned to the Battlecruiser Squadron until the ship was detached to convey the Duke and Duchess of York to Australia between January and July 1927. On the return journey, a boiler room caught fire on 26 May, burning four ratings before it was put out. Upon her return she rejoined the Atlantic Fleet. Renown became the flagship of the BCS when Hood was refitting between 1929 and 1931. Hood resumed the role as flagship after she was recommissioned and Renown was paid off for a refit of her own. A High-Angle Control System Mark I (HACS) was fitted with a director on the roof of the fore-top that replaced the high-angle rangefinder and the conning tower platform was enlarged to accommodate a pair of Mark V octuple mounts for the 40-millimetre (1.6 in) QF 2-pounder Mark VIII gun The Mark V mounts could depress to −10° and elevate to a maximum of 80°. The Mark VIII 2-pounder gun fired a 40-millimetre (1.6 in) 2-pound (0.91 kg) shell at a muzzle velocity of 2,040 ft/s (620 m/s) to a distance of 3,800 yards (3,500 m). The gun's rate of fire was approximately 96–98 rounds per minute. Only one mount was initially available, however, and it, along with its director, was fitted on the starboard side. Renown had her midships triple 4-inch mount removed to make room for an aircraft catapult that was not fitted until 1933. The port Mark V 2-pounder mount was finally fitted, albeit without its director, that same year. The ship now carried a Fairey III floatplane for reconnaissance purposes. The flying-off platform was also removed.

Renown collided with Hood on 23 January 1935 while on exercises off the coast of Spain. The damage to her bow was temporarily repaired at Gibraltar and the ship sailed to Portsmouth for permanent repairs between February and May. The captains of both ships were court-martialled, as was the squadron commander, Rear Admiral Sidney Bailey. Bailey and Hood's Captain Tower were acquitted, but Renown's Captain Sawbridge was relieved of command. The Admiralty dissented from the verdict, reinstated Sawbridge, and criticised Bailey for ambiguous signals during the manoeuvre.

The ship participated in King George V's Silver Jubilee Fleet Review at Spithead on 16 July. Together with Hood, Renown was sent to Gibraltar to reinforce the Mediterranean Fleet during the Second Italo-Abyssinian War of 1935–36 and transferred to Alexandria in January 1936 where she was assigned to the 1st Battle Squadron. She returned home in May and rejoined Home Fleet.

Renown began a much more thorough reconstruction in September 1936, based on that of the battleship HMS Warspite. Her superstructure and funnels were razed to the level of the upper deck, her masts taken out and the ship's main and secondary armament was removed. A large splinter-proof tower superstructure was built, topped with a director-control tower for the main armament and two HACS Mark IV directors. The armoured hood formerly mounted above the conning tower was reinstalled on the rear superstructure. The ship's engines and boilers were replaced by Parsons geared turbines and eight Admiralty three-drum boilers operating at 400 psi (2,758 kPa; 28 kgf/cm^{2}). This saved some 2,800 long tons (2,800 t) of weight and allowed the two forward boiler rooms to be converted to 4.5-inch (110 mm) magazines and other uses. Renown's deck protection was somewhat upgraded by adding non-cemented armour where it had not been added earlier and protecting the new 4.5-inch magazines. As in Repulse, hangars were built abreast her rear funnel and a catapult was fitted between the rear funnel and the aft superstructure.

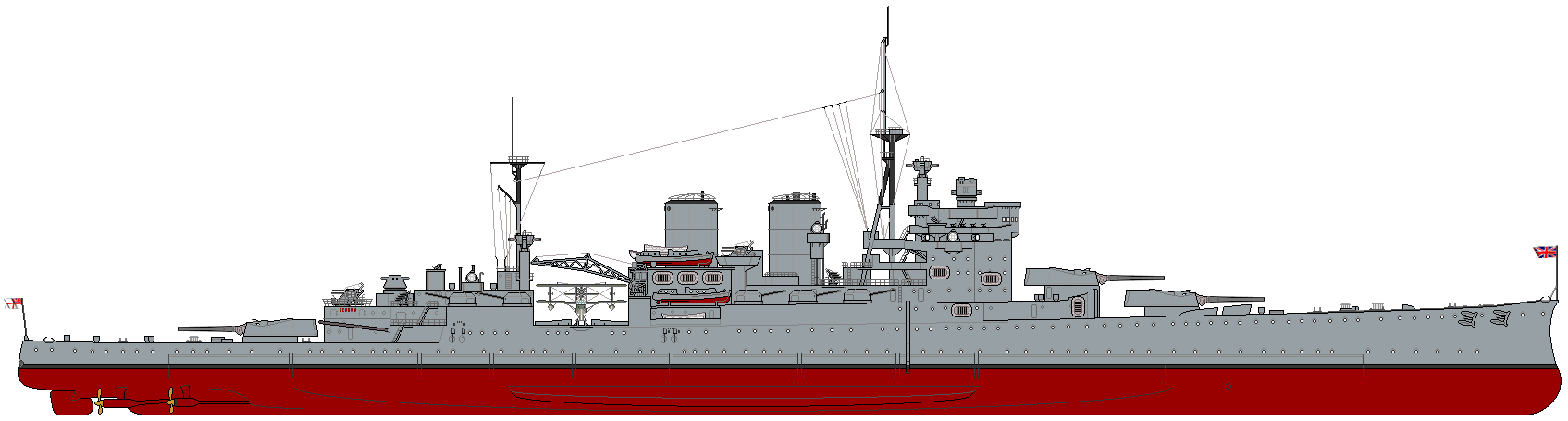
Renown, as reconstructed in 1939

The ship's 15-inch gun turrets were modified to the Mark I (N) standard with their elevation increased to 30°. Twenty dual-purpose QF 4.5-inch Mark III guns in twin BD Mark II mountings replaced all of the 4-inch guns. Six of the gun turrets, three on each side, were abreast the forward funnel while the remaining four were mounted abreast the main mast. The BD Mark II mounts had elevation limits of −5° to +80°. The Mark III gun fired a 55-pound (25 kg) high explosive shell at a new gun muzzle velocity of 2,457 ft/s (749 m/s). Its rate of fire was 12 rounds per minute. They had a maximum effective ceiling of 41,000 ft (12,000 m). The guns were controlled by four dual-purpose Mark IV directors, two mounted on the rear of the bridge structure and the remaining two on the aft superstructure. They fed tracking data to a HACS Mark IV analog computer for high-angle targets and an Admiralty Fire Control Clock Mark VII for low-angle targets. Each gun was provided with 400 rounds of ammunition. Three octuple Mark VI 2-pounder mounts were fitted, two on a platform between the funnels and the third at the rear of the aft superstructure. Each was provided with a Mark III* director. Four quadruple Vickers .50-calibre Mark III mounts were also added, two each on the forward and rear superstructures. The submerged torpedo tubes were removed and eight above-water torpedo tubes added. This reconstruction, at £3,088,008, was more than three times as expensive as her earlier reconstruction.

=== Second World War ===
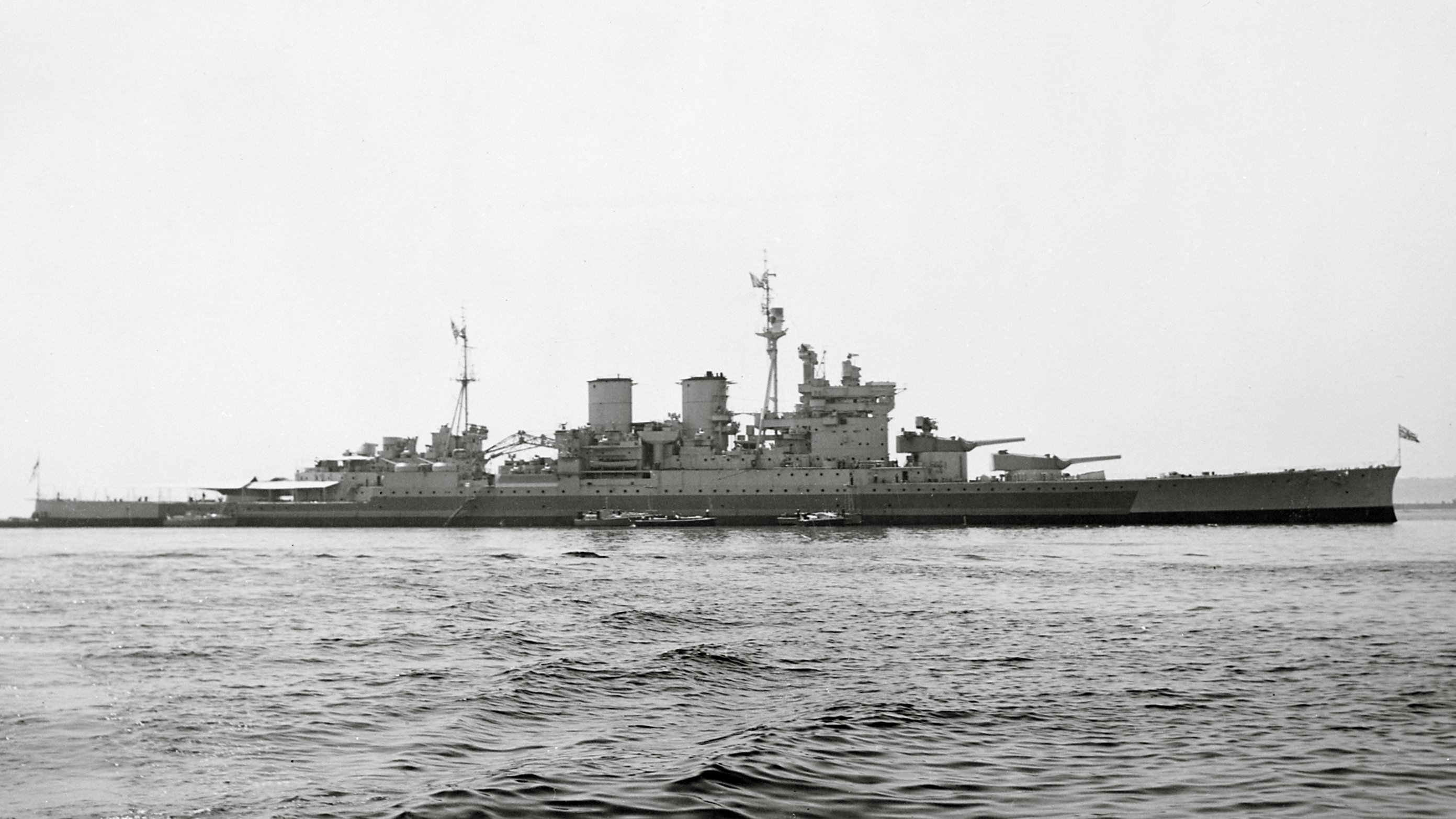
Renown in August 1945

Renown was recommissioned on 28 August 1939 as part of the Home Fleet. Much like her sister, she spent September patrolling in the North Sea, but was transferred to Force K in the South Atlantic in October to help search for the heavy cruiser Admiral Graf Spee. The ship joined Force H at the Cape of Good Hope in November to prevent Admiral Graf Spee from breaking into the South Atlantic. She was unsuccessful in this, but sank the blockade runner SS Watussi on 2 December. She remained in the South Atlantic even after Admiral Graf Spee was scuttled on 17 December and did not return to the Home Fleet until March 1940. The ship became flagship of the Battlecruiser Squadron when Hood was paid off to refit that month. Renown supported British forces during the Norwegian campaign and engaged the German battleships Scharnhorst and Gneisenau on 9 April.

Renown spotted the German ships and fired first, but she was hit first by two 28-centimetre (11 in) shells that only slightly damaged her. A few minutes later she hit Gneisenau with one 15-inch and two 4.5-inch shells that knocked out the ship's main fire-control director and damaged the rangefinder on 'A' turret. The German ships were faster than Renown in the heavy weather and were able to disengage after about 90 minutes. Renown expended 230 rounds from her main armament and 1,065 rounds from her secondary armament during the engagement. The ship was under repair from 20 April to 18 May and provided cover during the evacuation from Norway in early June. Renown was transferred to Force H at Gibraltar in August and relieved Hood as flagship.

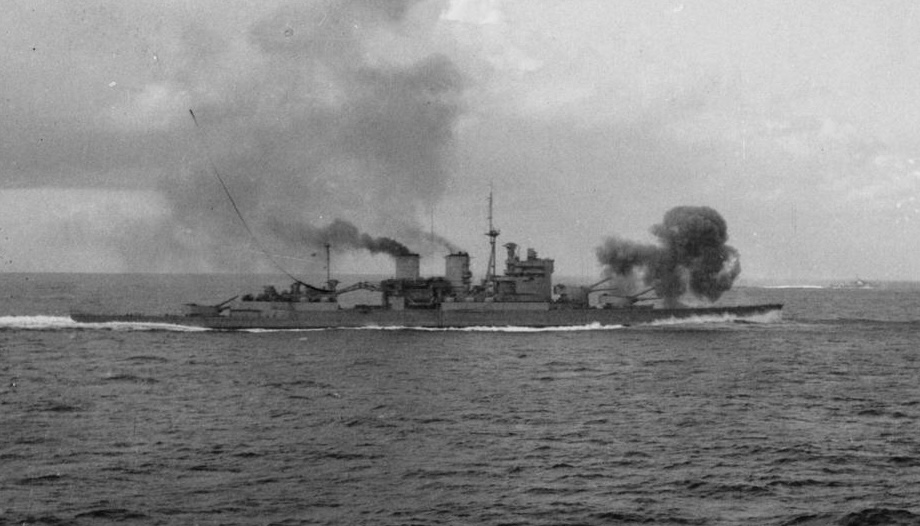
Renown firing a salvo from her A and B turrets during the Battle of Cape Spartivento, 27 November 1940

In November 1940 Force H covered the small aircraft carrier HMS Argus as she flew off Hurricane fighters bound for Malta from a position south of Sardinia. Later that month Force H participated in the inconclusive Battle of Cape Spartivento. Renown bombarded Genoa on 9 February 1941 with little effect. Force H escorted convoys both inside and outside the Mediterranean in March–May 1941 before being summoned into the Atlantic to search for the German battleship Bismarck. The ship intercepted the German supply ship Gonzenheim, which had been intended to supply Bismarck, on 4 June. Renown and Force H escorted another convoy to Malta in July and the ship returned home for repairs to her starboard bulge the next month.

While the exact dates are not known, the ship received a variety of radars in 1941, possibly during this refit. These included Type 284 radar for surface gunnery control, Type 285 anti-aircraft gunnery radar, Type 281 air warning radar and a Type 271 surface search radar. Two quadruple "pom-pom" mounts were also fitted on top of 'B' turret. Renown was transferred to the Home Fleet in November when her repairs were complete and became deputy fleet flagship when Duke of York was detached to take Winston Churchill to the Arcadia Conference in Washington, D.C., on 9 December. She provided cover for the inbound and outbound convoys to the Soviet Union in early March 1942. Renown was relieved as flagship by Duke of York on 3 April, but became flagship of Force W which was formed to escort carriers carrying fighters to be flown-off for Malta in April–May. Renown rejoined Home Fleet once those missions were completed, but was transferred to Force H in October 1942 to participate in Operation Torch. She covered the invasion and follow-up convoys against interference by the French or Italian fleets.

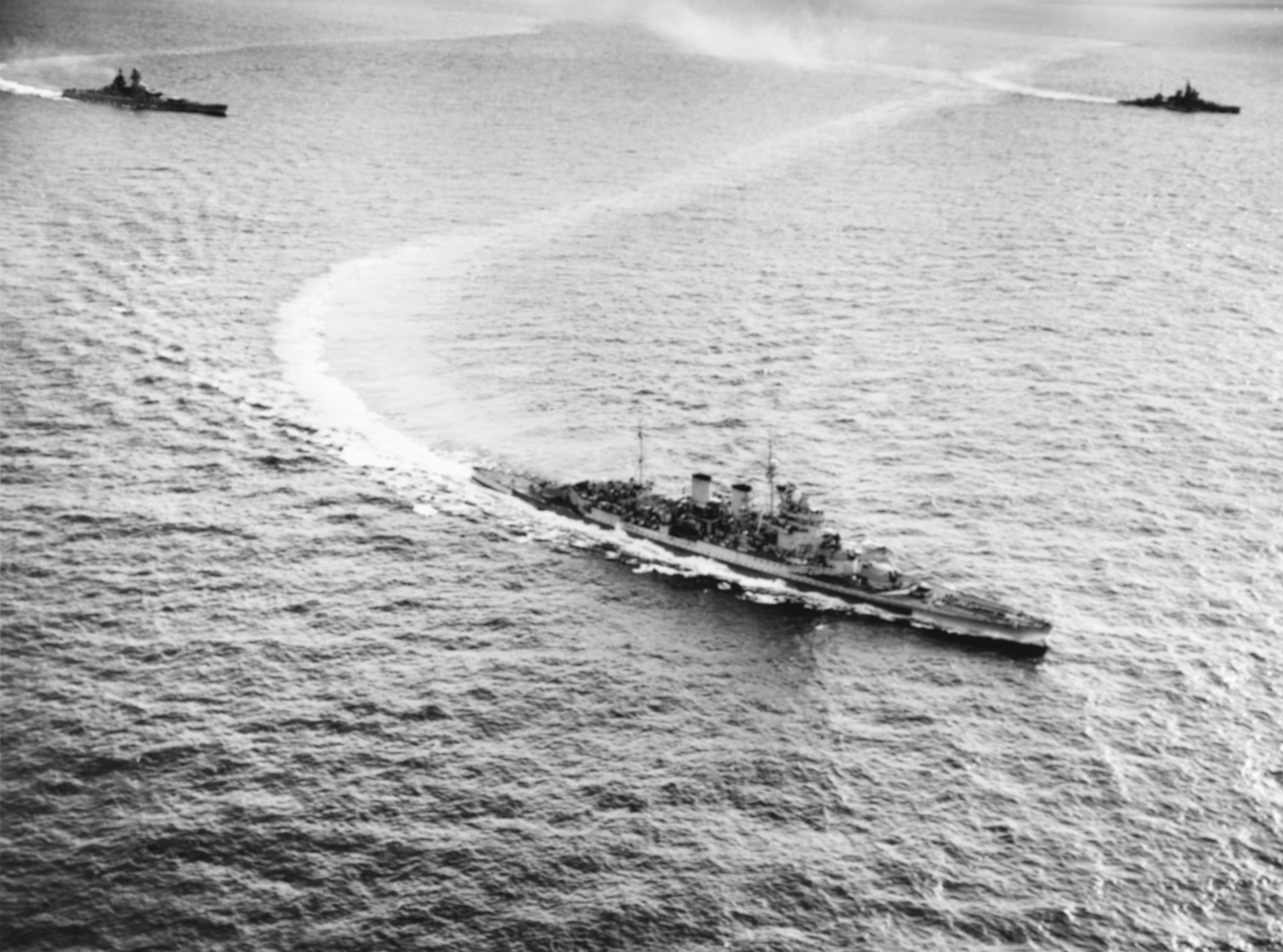
Renown operating with the battleship Valiant (right distance) and the French battleship Richelieu (left distance) in the Indian Ocean, 12 May 1944

Renown returned to Britain to refit from February to June 1943; her catapult and aircraft were removed while the hangar was converted to a laundry and a cinema. She also received a total of 72 Oerlikon 20 mm light AA guns in 23 twin mounts and 26 single mounts fitted between July 1942 and August 1943. In January 1944 a quadruple "pom-pom" mounting was placed on the roof of 'B' turret and the 20 mm guns there were moved. Additional light AA directors with Type 282 radars were also fitted during this time. The ship brought Winston Churchill and his staff back from the Quebec Conference in September and conveyed them to the Cairo Conference in November. She rejoined the Home Fleet in December, just in time to be transferred to the Eastern Fleet a few weeks later. Renown arrived in Colombo at the end of January 1944 where she became flagship of the 1st Battle Squadron. In April she participated in Operation Cockpit, an air strike against port and oil facilities on Sabang, off the island of Sumatra.

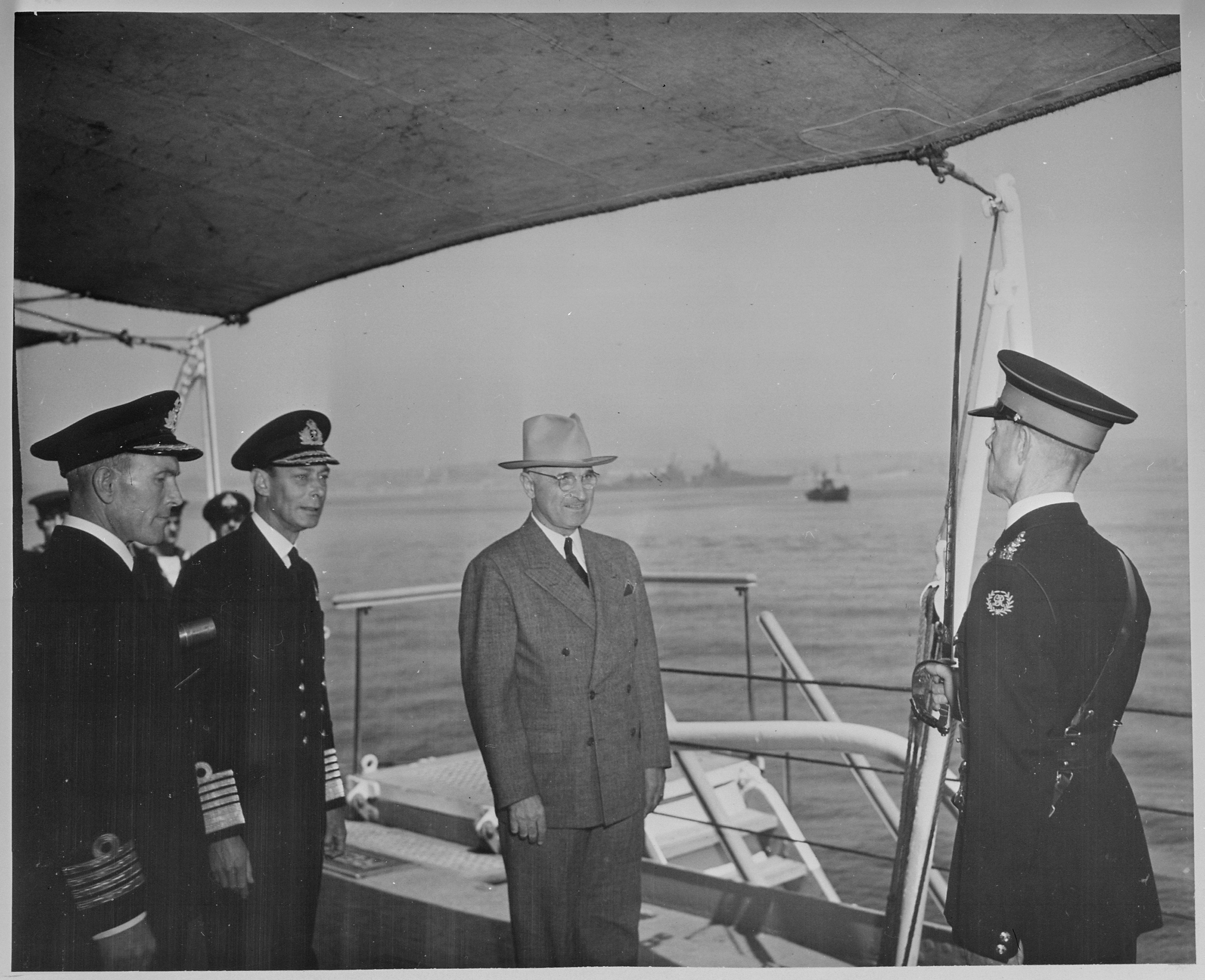
President Harry S. Truman and King George VI on the quarterdeck of Renown on 2 August 1945, where the President had lunch with the King. Truman is preparing to leave England on the Augusta, visible in the background, after attending the Potsdam Conference in Germany.

The ship bombarded Japanese-occupied facilities on Car Nicobar in the Nicobar Islands and Port Blair in the Andaman Islands on 30 April – 1 May. Renown supported the air strike against Surabaya, Java (Operation Transom) on 17 May as well as the follow-on attack against Port Blair on 21 June. After another air strike on 25 July on Sabang the ship bombarded the city. She bombarded facilities in the Nicobar Islands from 17 to 19 October. On 22 November Renown was replaced as flagship by HMS Queen Elizabeth and the ship began a refit at Durban from December to February 1945.

Renown was recalled in March lest the remaining German heavy ships make a final sortie and reached Rosyth on 15 April. She was given a brief refit when this concern proved illusory and was placed in reserve in May 1945. She was partially disarmed in July when six of her 4.5-inch turrets were removed preparatory to fitting these mountings with remote power control. The refit was subsequently cancelled. The ship hosted a meeting between King George VI and President Truman on 2 August in Plymouth Sound when the latter was en route home from the Potsdam Conference and joined the heavy cruiser USS Augusta. The decision to dispose of the ship was announced on 21 January 1948 and she was towed to Faslane for scrapping on 3 August. She was the last British battlecruiser to be scrapped, outlasting Furious by a few days.
