= John Talbot Savignac Hall =

Royal Navy officer

Rear-Admiral John Talbot Savignac Hall CIE
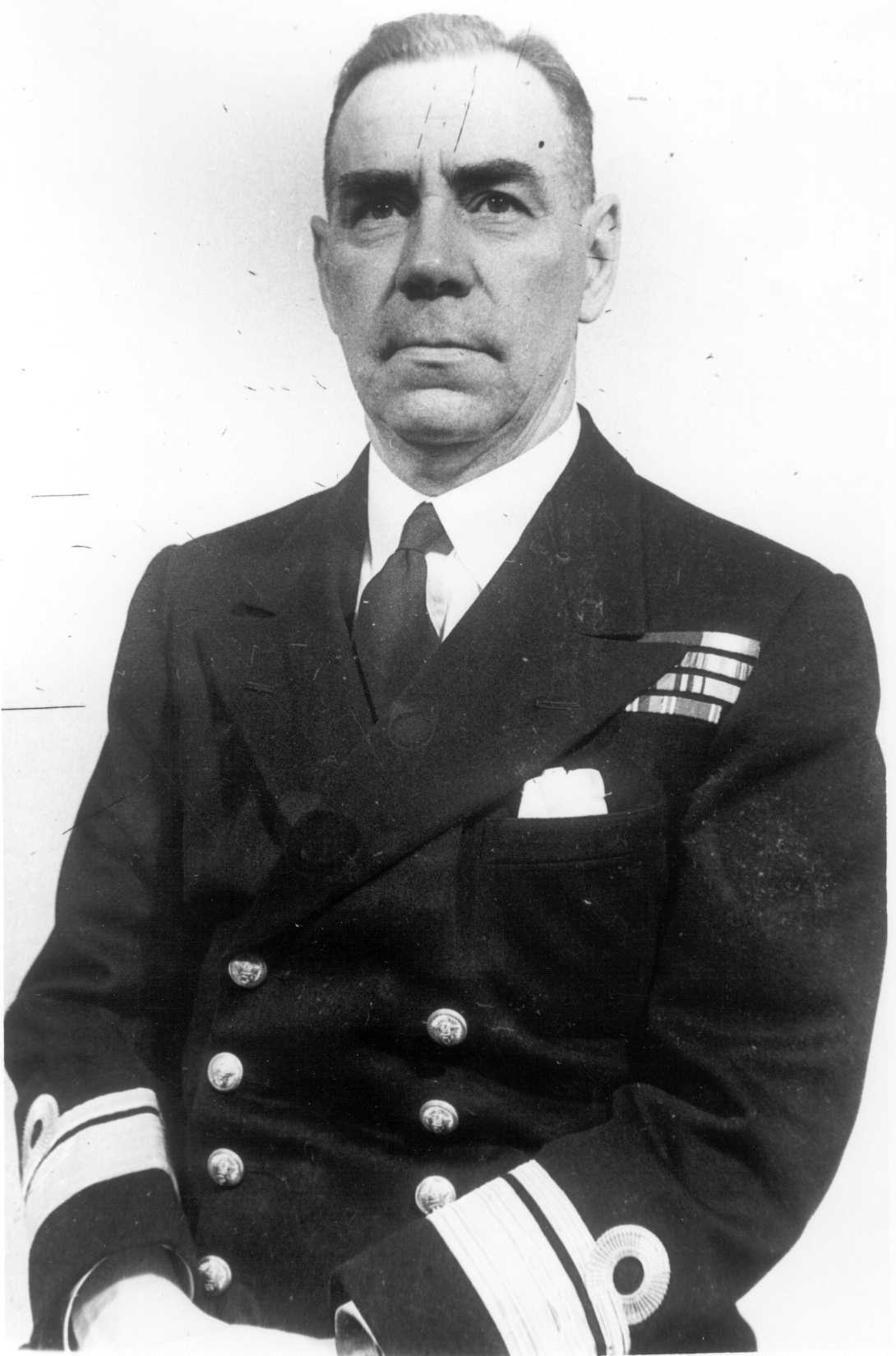
- Hall as Commander-in-Chief, Royal Indian Navy

1st Commander-in-Chief, Royal Indian Navy
- In office 15 August 1947 – 20 June 1948
- Monarch: George VI
- Governor General: Lord Mountbatten
- Prime Minister: Jawaharlal Nehru
- Preceded by: Office Established
- Succeeded by: Office Abolished

1st Chief of the Naval Staff and Commander-in-Chief, Royal Indian Navy
- In office 21 June 1948 – 14 August 1948
- Monarch: George VI
- Governor General: C. Rajagopalachari
- Prime Minister: Jawaharlal Nehru
- Preceded by: Office Established
- Succeeded by: Edward Parry

Personal details
- Born: 30 November 1896
- Died: 21 January 1964 (aged 67)
- Awards: Companion of the Order of the Indian Empire

Military service
- Allegiance: United Kingdom; British India; India
- Branch/service: Royal Navy; Royal Indian Navy; Indian Navy
- Years of service: 1914–1950
- Rank: Rear-Admiral
- Battles/wars: World War I World War II

Rear-Admiral John Talbot Savignac Hall, CIE (30 November 1896 – 21 January 1964) was a Royal Navy officer who became the first post-Independence Commander-in-Chief and Chief of Naval Staff of the Royal Indian Navy.

== Early life ==
Hall was born in Kent, the third son of Dr. William Hamilton Hall, FSA. He was educated at Elstow School in Bedford and then served in the Merchant Navy before being co-opted into the Royal Navy on his 18th birthday.

== Naval career ==
Hall served aboard HMS London off Gallipoli in the Dardanelles Campaign. In 1921, he was commissioned as a lieutenant in the Royal Indian Marine, and was promoted to lieutenant-commander in 1928. The following year, he became the executive officer on HMIS Lawrence a minesweeper and then transferred to another minesweeper, HMIS Clive in 1930. In 1932, he was appointed commanding officer of the patrol boat HMIS Baluchi. He held this command until 1934. From February to July 1937, Hall was appointed Officer-in-Charge, Navy Office Section for the Defence Department (Navy Branch) of the Government of India. In April 1937, he was promoted to commander. In 1938, he was appointed Staff Officer (Plans), Naval HQ, aboard HMIS Dalhousie.

Hall was promoted to commodore 2nd Class on 1 December 1942, and appointed chief of staff to the Commander-in-Chief of the RIN. In January 1944, he was promoted to captain and appointed a Companion of the Order of the Indian Empire. He was then appointed as the Senior Naval Staff Officer and RIN liaison officer to the India Office, serving in this capacity until 1946. Hall then commanded HMS Achilles. Upon Indian independence, he was selected to become the first post-Independence Commander-in-Chief of the Royal Indian Navy. Hall served for one year, when he was replaced by Admiral Edward Parry.

Afterwards, in his permanent rank of captain, Hall commanded a destroyer squadron with HMIS Delhi (later INS Delhi) as his flagship. On 1 April 1950, he was promoted to the substantive rank of rear-admiral in the newly renamed Indian Navy. He retired from active duty on 1 September 1950, with the rank of rear-admiral. From 1951 to 1959, he served as a civil defence officer for northeast Essex. Hall died in London in 1964, aged 67.

== Personal life ==
In 1933, he married Agnes Maud Shereen; the couple had one daughter (Elizabeth Anne) and a son (also John) who died in a missile hook-up accident while training with the Fleet Air-arm of the Scottish coast near HMS Fulmar, RNAS (now RAF) Lossiemouth.
