= Eric Longley-Cook =

Royal Navy Vice Admiral (1898–1983)

Vice-Admiral Eric Longley-Cook CB CBE DSO
- Born: 6 October 1898
- Died: 20 April 1983 (aged 84)
- Military career
- Allegiance: United Kingdom
- Branch: Royal Navy
- Service years: 1914–1951
- Rank: Vice-Admiral
- Commands: Director of Naval Intelligence (1948–51); HMS Argonaut (1942–43); HMS Caradoc (1939–40)
- Conflicts: First World War; Second World War: North African campaign; Allied invasion of Sicily; Normandy landings
- Awards: Companion of the Order of the Bath; Commander of the Order of the British Empire; Distinguished Service Order; Mentioned in Despatches (3); Legion of Honour (France)

Vice-Admiral Eric William Longley-Cook, CB, CBE, DSO (6 October 1898 – 20 April 1983) was a Royal Navy officer.

== Naval career ==
Longley-Cook joined the Royal Navy as a cadet at the Royal Naval College, Dartmouth and was mobilised at the start of the First World War. He saw action in the battleship HMS Prince of Wales in the British Adriatic Squadron.

He served in the Second World War as commanding officer of the cruiser HMS Caradoc from July 1939, as deputy director of Training and Staff Duties from October 1940 and as deputy director of Gunnery and Anti-Aircraft Warfare from July 1941. He went on to be commanding officer of the cruiser HMS Argonaut from April 1942, Captain of the Fleet for the Mediterranean Fleet in January 1943 and Captain of the Fleet for the East Indies Fleet in January 1945.

After the war he became Chief of Staff for the Home Fleet in November 1946 and Director of Naval Intelligence in May 1948. In that capacity he warned the British Government that the United States "was set to bomb Russia first" and that "all-out war against the Soviet Union was not only inevitable but imminent".

Military offices
Preceded by Edward Parry	Director of Naval Intelligence; 1948–1951	Succeeded by Sir Anthony Buzzard
