= Buzzard baronets =

Baronetcy in the Baronetage of the United Kingdom

The Buzzard Baronetcy, of Munstead Grange in the Parish of Godalming in the County of Surrey, is a title in the Baronetage of the United Kingdom. It was created on 25 June 1929 for the prominent physician Sir Farquhar Buzzard. He was Regius Professor of Medicine at the University of Oxford from 1928 to 1943 and Physician-in-Ordinary to King George V from 1932 to 1936. Buzzard was succeeded by his eldest son, the second Baronet. He was a Rear-Admiral in the Royal Navy. As of 2007 the title is held by his eldest son, the third Baronet, who succeeded in 1972.

== Buzzard baronets, of Munstead Grange (1929) ==
- Sir (Edward) Farquhar Buzzard, 1st Baronet (1871–1945)
- Sir Anthony Wass Buzzard, 2nd Baronet (1902–1972)
- Sir Anthony Farquhar Buzzard, 3rd Baronet (born 1935)

The heir presumptive to the baronetcy is the nephew of the 3rd Baronet, Jonathan Mark Buzzard (born 1977). There are no further heirs to the title.
