= Buzzards Bay (disambiguation) =

Buzzards Bay is a bay along the southern edge of Massachusetts in the United States. The name may also refer to:

- Buzzards Bay, Massachusetts, a village in Bourne, Massachusetts
- Buzzards Bay Entrance Light, a lighthouse near Cuttyhunk Island, Massachusetts
- Buzzards Bay station, a train station in Buzzards Bay, Massachusetts
- Buzzards Bay (horse), a racehorse that won the 2005 Santa Anita Derby
