= Farquhar Buzzard =

British physician (1871–1945)

Professor Sir Farquhar Buzzard Bt KCVO FRCP
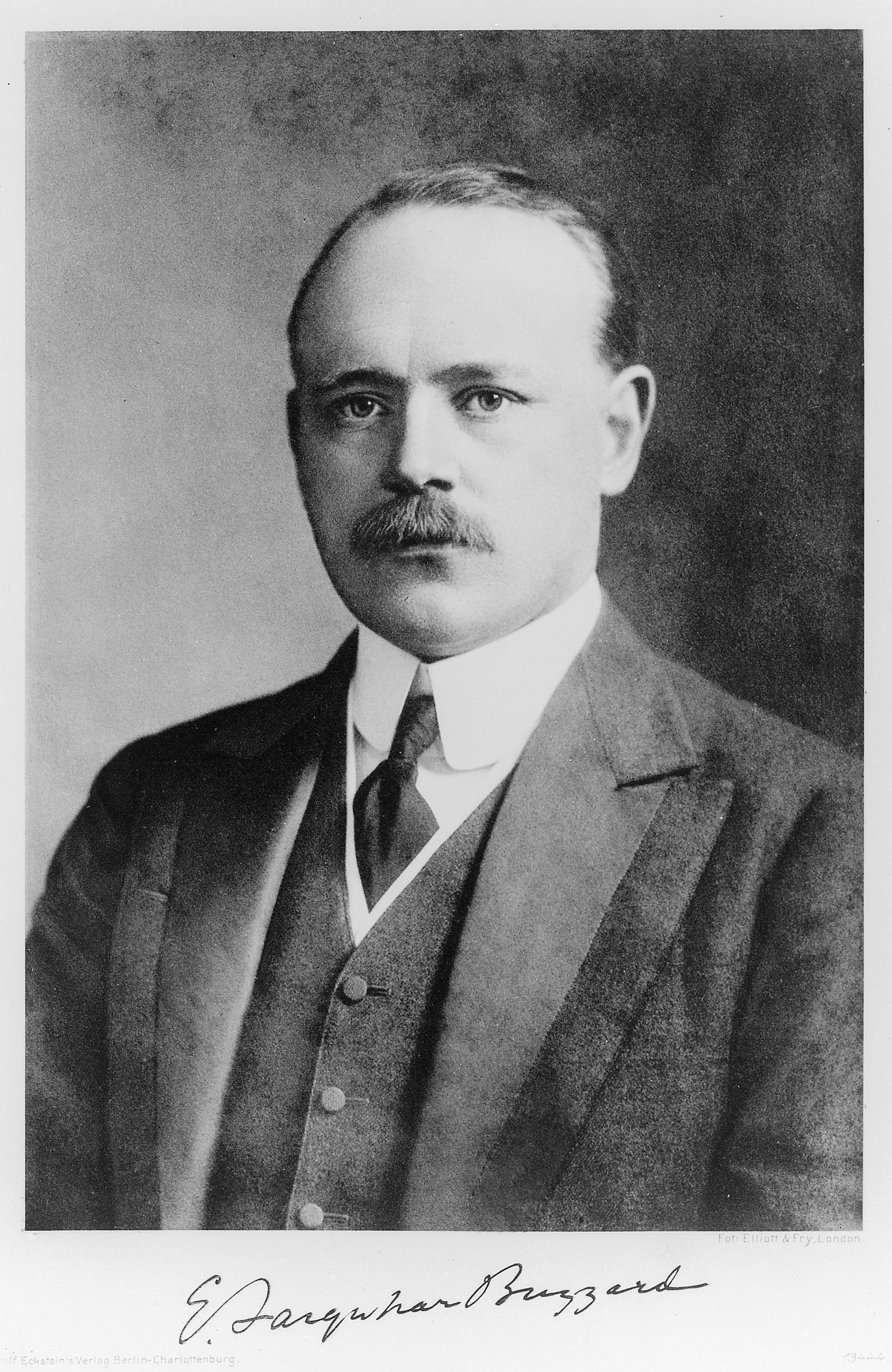
- Born: 20 December 1871
- Died: 17 December 1945 (aged 73)
- Medical career
- Institutions: University of Oxford

Sir Edward Farquhar Buzzard, 1st Baronet, KCVO, FRCP (20 December 1871 – 17 December 1945) was a British physician and Regius Professor of Medicine at the University of Oxford (1928–1943).

== Career ==
Farquhar Buzzard was born on 20 December 1871, one of six children of the neurologist Thomas Buzzard. and his wife Isabel Wass. Educated at Charterhouse School and Christ Church, Oxford, during his career he was Consultant Physician at St. Thomas' Hospital, London, Goulstonian Lecturer in 1907 at the Royal College of Physicians, London, a physician at the Belgrave Hospital for Children, the National Hospital for Paralysed and Epileptic, the Royal Free Hospital, London, a Fellow of Royal College of Physicians, Lettsomian Lecturer in 1926 at the Medical Society of London, and president of the British Medical Association between 1936 and 1937.

He gained the rank of Honorary Colonel in the service of the Royal Army Medical Corps and was made a Knight Commander of the Royal Victorian Order (KCVO) in the 1927 Birthday Honours. Two years later he was created a baronet, of Munstead Grange in the Parish of Godalming in the County of Surrey. He was Physician-in-Ordinary to King George V between 1932 and 1936, and to Edward VIII in 1936. He was made Extra Physician to George VI in 1937 and stood unsuccessfully (to split the vote) as a Conservative in the 1937 Oxford University by-election.

Buzzard married May, daughter of Edward Bliss, on 21 March 1899. They had two sons and three daughters, Margaret (Gardiner-Hill), Anthony, Sylvia, Teddy and Bella (Acworth). He died in December 1945, aged 73, and was succeeded in the baronetcy by his eldest son, Sir Anthony Wass Buzzard, who became a Rear-Admiral in the Royal Navy. Lady Buzzard died in March 1950.

== Medical Advances at Oxford University ==
Following becoming Regius Professor of Medicine at Oxford University (1928), Buzzard represented the University on the General Medical Council, having previously represented the Royal College of Physicians. He became Chairman of the Faculty of Medicine, a Curator of the Bodleian Library and University Representative on Oxford City Council. He had plans to create a Medical School at Oxford. In 1929-30 Buzzard persuaded Lord Nuffield to purchase the Radcliffe Observatory for the Radcliffe Hospital, thereby doubling the size of the hospital site. Buzzard incubated a plan for an Institute of Medical Research at Oxford and founded the Nuffield Medical Benefaction and the Oxford Medical School was born.

Baronetage of the United Kingdom
New title	Baronet (of Munstead Grange); 1929–1945	Succeeded by Anthony Wass Buzzard
