= Cape Salinas =

Southernmost point of Majorca, Spain

Coordinates: 39°15.9′N 3°3.3′E

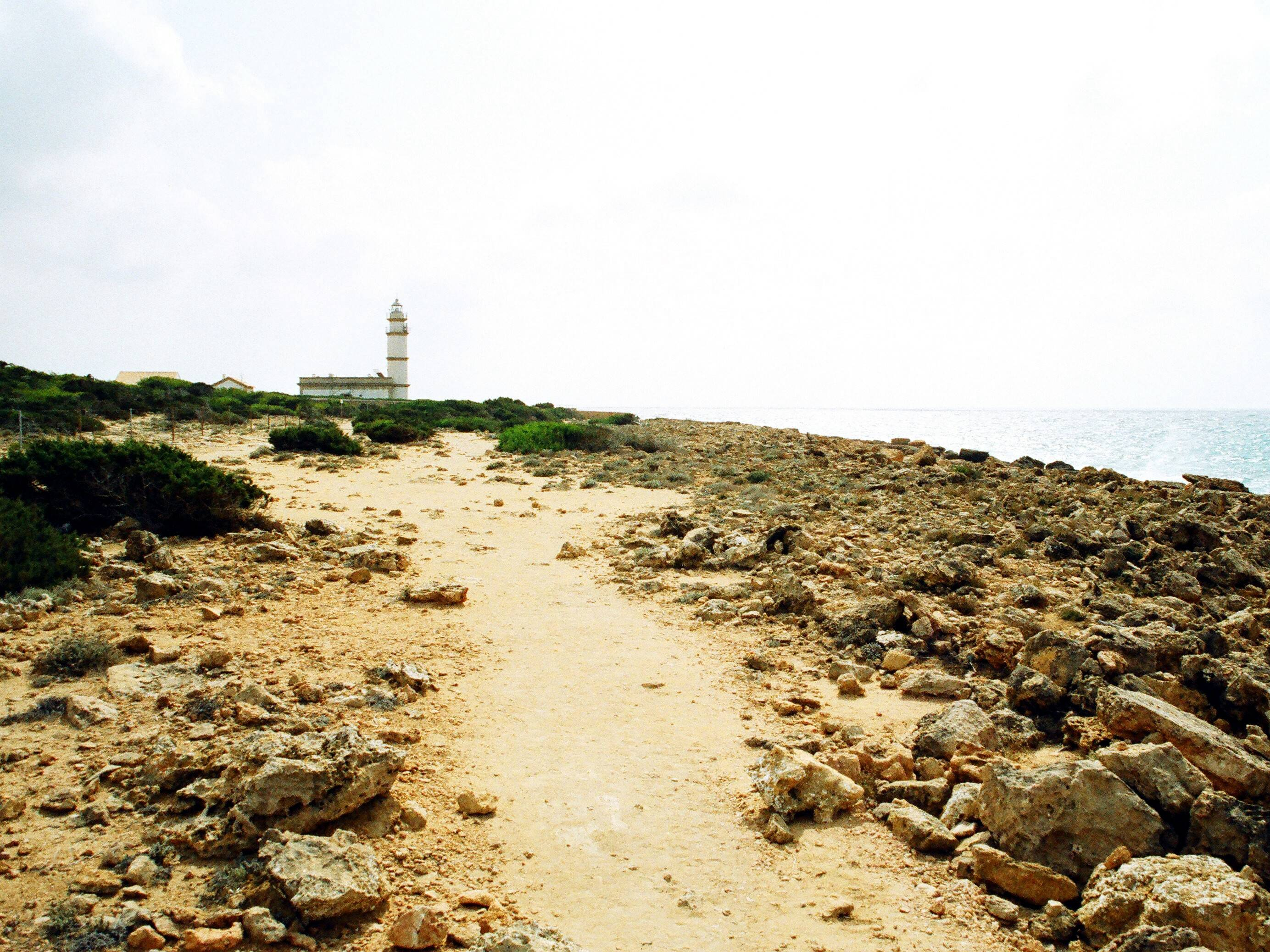
Cape Salinas

Cape Salinas is the southernmost point of Majorca, used for reference by sailors and navigators.

== Bibliography ==
- Purdy, John (1826). The new sailing directions for the Mediterranean sea... H.R. Laurie.
