= Sir Anthony Buzzard, 3rd Baronet =

Royal Navy officer

Sir Anthony Farquhar Buzzard, 3rd Baronet, ARCM (b. 28 June 1935), is a biblical scholar, Biblical unitarian Christian theologian, author and professor on the faculty of Atlanta Bible College.

== Early life ==
Anthony was born on 28 June 1935 in Surrey, England, the son of prominent Royal Navy officer and Director of Naval Intelligence Anthony Buzzard, and grandson of the Regius Professor of Medicine at the University of Oxford Sir Edward Farquhar Buzzard. He succeeded to the title of Baronet of Munstead Grange in the Parish of Godalming, co. Surrey on the death of his father in 1972, and has a younger brother Tim and younger sister Gill.

== Education ==
Buzzard was educated at Charterhouse, and served in the Royal Navy as a sub-lieutenant in the secretarial branch between 1954 and 1956. In 1960 he graduated in Modern Languages in French and German from the University of Oxford.

Anthony Buzzard was a 1963 graduate of Ambassador College, part of the Worldwide Church of God founded by Herbert W. Armstrong. Upon graduation in Pasadena, California, Buzzard then transferred to teach music at its campus in Bricket Wood, England. In the early 1970s, Buzzard left the Worldwide Church of God and published theological views refuting those of Armstrong. He became a close associate of Charles F. Hunting, an American evangelist who had been an official of the Bricket Wood campus.

== Education and teaching ==
Buzzard gained a Diploma in Biblical Hebrew from the University of Jerusalem in 1970. He attended the University of London. He gained a Masters in Theology from Bethany Theological Seminary, Chicago, in 1990.

Buzzard taught French and German at The American School in London and taught theology and Biblical languages for 24 years at Atlanta Bible College, McDonough, Georgia (formerly Oregon [IL] Bible College).

== Restoration Fellowship ==
Following his break with Armstrong, in 1981 Buzzard, founded with the help of Charles F. Hunting, the Restoration Fellowship, a Christian group dedicated to missionary and teaching work all over the world. It is affiliated with the Church of God General Conference, a group founded in 1921, holding Adventist and Unitarian beliefs, similar to the Church of the Blessed Hope and Christadelphians.

Buzzard publishes a monthly newsletter Focus on the Kingdom, and is co-editor of A Journal from the Radical Reformation, which explores continuity between the beliefs of Reformation groups - such as some Anabaptists, Socinians, early Unitarians and "Biblical Unitarian" groups today. Buzzard has been noted as one of the principal writers seeking a revival of early Unitarian beliefs.

== Music ==
Apart from excelling in languages and biblical studies, Anthony also has a love of classical music. He studied at the Royal College of Music, London, where he gained Diplomas in oboe in 1959 and piano in 1961.

== Theological views ==
Buzzard shares the following beliefs, as expressed on his Restoration Fellowship website:

- There is one God, the Father (1 Cor. 8:6), the one God of the creed of Israel affirmed by Jesus Christ (Mark 12:28ff). The Father is "the only true God" (John 17:3).
- There is one Lord Messiah, Jesus (1 Cor. 8:6), who was supernaturally conceived as the Son of God (Luke 1:35), and foreordained from the foundation of the world (1 Pet. 1:20).
- The Holy Spirit is the personal, operational presence and power of God extended through the risen Christ to believers (Ps. 51:11).
- The Bible, consisting of the Hebrew canon (Luke 24:44) and the Greek New Testament Scriptures, is the inspired and authoritative revelation of God (2 Tim. 3:16).
- In the atoning, substitutionary death of Jesus, his resurrection on the third day, and his ascension to the right hand of the Father (Ps. 110:1; Acts 2:34-36), where he is waiting until his enemies are subdued (Heb. 10:13).
- In the future visible return of Jesus Christ to raise to life the faithful dead (1 Cor. 15:23), establish the millennial Kingdom on earth (Rev. 20:1-6, etc.) and bring about the restoration of the earth promised by the prophets (Acts 1:6; 3:21; 26:6, 7).
- In the regenerating power of the Gospel message about the Kingdom (Matt. 13:19; Luke 8:12; John 6:63), enabling the believer to understand divine revelation and live a life of holiness.
- In baptism by immersion upon reception of the Gospel of the Kingdom and the things concerning Jesus (Acts 8:12; Luke 24:27).
- In the future resurrection of the saved of all the ages to administer the renewed earth with the Messiah in the Kingdom of God (1 Cor. 6:2; 2 Tim. 2:12; Rev. 2:26; 3:21; 5:10).
- In the existence of supernatural, cosmic evil headed by (the) Satan (Matt. 12:26) or Devil, as distinct from and in addition to human enemies and the natural evil of the human heart. Satan is the name of a wicked spirit personality, "the god of this age" (2 Cor. 4:4; cp. Eph. 6:12). And in the existence of demons (daimonia) as non-human personalities whom Jesus addressed and they him (Luke 4:41; James 2:19).
- In the freedom "under grace" and not "under law," inaugurated at the cross in the New Covenant, in contrast to and replacing the Mosaic covenant enacted at Sinai (Gal. 3 and 4; 2 Cor. 3). Issues of physical circumcision and "the whole law" (Gal. 5:3) associated with circumcision, including calendar and food laws, are concerns of the old and not the new covenant. Compare Col. 2:16-17 where the temporary shadow is contrasted with the permanence and newness of Christ.
- Christians ought never to take up arms and kill their enemies and fellow believers in other nations (Matt. 26:52; John 15:19; 18:36; 1 Pet. 2:9-11; 1 Chron. 22:8).

== Books ==
- The Coming Kingdom of the Messiah: A Solution to the Riddle of the New Testament (1988)
- Our Fathers Who Aren’t in Heaven: The Forgotten Christianity of Jesus the Jew (1995)
- The Doctrine of the Trinity: Christianity's Self-Inflicted Wound (1998) – original edition with Charles F. Hunting
- The Law, the Sabbath and New Covenant Christianity (2005)
- The Amazing Aims and Claims of Jesus (2006)
- Jesus Was Not a Trinitarian (2007)

== Booklets ==
- "Who Is Jesus? A Plea for a Return to Belief in Jesus the Messiah" (1984)
- "What Happens When We Die? A Biblical View of Death and Resurrection" (1986)

Baronetage of the United Kingdom
Preceded by Anthony W Buzzard	Baronet (of Munstead Grange); 1972–present	Incumbent
