= Sir Anthony Buzzard, 2nd Baronet =

Royal Navy officer (1902–1972)

Rear-Admiral Sir Anthony Buzzard Bt CB DSO OBE
- Buzzard in 1951
- Born: 28 April 1902; Derbyshire, East Midlands
- Died: 10 March 1972 (aged 69); West Clandon, Surrey
- Military career
- Allegiance: United Kingdom
- Branch: Royal Navy
- Service years: 1915–1954
- Rank: Rear-Admiral
- Commands: Director of Naval Intelligence (1951–54); HMS Superb (1946–50); HMS Glory (1944–45); HMS Gurkha (1940)
- Conflicts: First World War; Second World War: Operation Grog; Sinking of the Bismarck
- Awards: Companion of the Order of the Bath; Distinguished Service Order; Officer of the Order of the British Empire; Mentioned in Despatches

Rear-Admiral Sir Anthony Wass Buzzard, 2nd Baronet, CB, DSO, OBE (28 April 1902 – 10 March 1972) was an officer in the Royal Navy who served as Director of Naval Intelligence from 1951 to 1954.

== Early life ==
Anthony Wass Buzzard was born on 28 April 1902 at Lea Green in Derbyshire, the home of his mother's father, son of prominent physician and Regius Professor of Medicine at the University of Oxford Sir Edward Farquhar Buzzard. Anthony was raised in Surrey at his father's estate, Munstead Grange. His father was a doctor and Honorary Physician to King George VI. In 1929, his father was created a baronet, of Munstead Grange in the Parish of Godalming in the County of Surrey. Anthony was the second eldest of five siblings: Margaret, Anthony, Sylvia, and Isabel. He attended a preparatory school from age eight to thirteen, and studied at the Royal Naval College, Osborne, followed by the Royal Naval College, Dartmouth. In 1915, at the age of thirteen, he joined the Royal Navy as a midshipman, and served during the First World War. By 1919 he was aboard the battleship HMS Iron Duke.

== Second World War ==
Buzzard commanded the destroyer HMS Gurkha during the early years of the war, and his actions during her sinking led to the award of the Distinguished Service Order. Gurkha was part of a force of cruisers and destroyers sent by the British in the immediate aftermath of the German invasion of Norway on 7 April 1940. Gurkha was the first British destroyer sunk by an air attack. On 19 April the British ships were attacked by Junkers Ju 88 and Heinkel He 111 bombers. Gurkha was hit by one bomb on the aft end, which blew a forty-foot hole in the starboard side. The stern caught fire. She then sank; the crew were rescued by the light cruiser HMS Aurora at the last moment; Aurora managed to rescue 190 officers and men.

Buzzard was then one of the captains assigned to visit the parents of those lost in the sinking of HMS Hood to offer his condolences. By 1941 Buzzard was serving as gunnery officer aboard the battleship HMS Rodney during the pursuit and sinking of the German battleship Bismarck, with the Rodney being the first ship to open fire with her own guns. On 14 October 1941 Buzzard was appointed as an Officer of the Order of the British Empire for his service. Buzzard then served as assistant director, in the Admiralty Plans Division, and as a member of Joint Planning Committee, with the War Cabinet between 1942 and 1943.

Buzzard became captain of the aircraft carrier HMS Glory. He spent three months overseeing the final fitting out before Glory was commissioned on 21 February 1945. On 14 May the ship became operational and departed her harbour, bound for the Mediterranean. From there she went on to Fremantle, where she arrived in time for Victory over Japan Day. Once V.J. Day was over, the ship went to Rabaul for the signing of the surrender of the Japanese forces there. The Japanese commander surrendered his sword to the British and American soldiers. This sword remained in Buzzard's possession until his death; it was then taken to the Churchill Archives Centre, along with other important artefacts. He inherited the Buzzard baronetcy upon his father's death in December 1945.

== Post-war ==
Buzzard was assigned to the Royal Naval Air Service after the end of the war, and commanded the cruiser HMS Superb between 1946 and 1950. In 1951, at the age of forty-nine, Buzzard became the youngest man to be appointed Director of Naval Intelligence. He was promoted rear admiral. As Director of Naval Intelligence, Buzzard helped develop the nuclear deterrent policy in the early 1950s and was fundamental to it. He was in the post until his retirement in 1954.

After his retirement from the service he joined the defence contractor Vickers-Armstrong, during the Cold War. Buzzard was a founder member of both the Institute of Strategic Studies, and the council of Christian Approaches to Defence and Disarmament. He frequently corresponded with Henry Kissinger, and developed the idea of "Graduated Deterrence". Graduated Deterrence posited that one must issue a reasonable threat to one's enemy that is also realizable and not so massive that no one believes that it will ever happen. During the 1960s he sat on the Minister of State for Disarmament, Lord Chalfont's Disarmament Panel. In 1967 he became Chairman of the British Council of Churches Committee on the Middle East.

== Death ==
Buzzard played tennis and rugby throughout his life, with his main passion being tennis, having been the Navy champion. He had played doubles with his brother at Wimbledon in 1922. He suffered a heart attack at the age of sixty-five, but refused to slow down the pace of his life, to the consternation of his wife. He travelled to Australia in 1968, and played a tennis match upon arrival after a thirty-eight-hour flight. He suffered a second heart attack. His wife joined him in Australia, and four years later, in 1972, he suffered a third and fatal heart attack and died on 10 March at the age of sixty-nine. His memorial service at St. Martins was attended by a large number of people.

== Notes ==
=== References ===
- Ballard, Robert (1991). Exploring the Bismarck. Singapore: Odyssey Corporation.
- Buzzard, Anthony (24 February 2002). "Personal interview" (Interview).
- Hurley, Anne. Rev. of National Geographic's Search for Battleship Bismarck.
- McGowen, Tom (1999). Sink the Bismarck Germany's Super-Battleship of World War II. Brookfield, CT: Twenty-First Century Books. ISBN 9780761315100.
- Sloan, Frank (1991). Bismarck!. New York: A Franklin Watts Library Edition.
- Wright, Christina (April 2002). The Papers of Rear-Admiral Sir Anthony Wass Buzzard; Sir Anthony Wass Buzzard and the Sinking of the Bismarck.

Military offices
Preceded by Eric Longley-Cook	Director of Naval Intelligence; 1951–1954	Succeeded by Sir John Inglis
Baronetage of the United Kingdom
Preceded by Farquhar Buzzard	Baronet (of Munstead Grange); 1945–1972	Succeeded by Anthony F. Buzzard
