= Admiral Graham =

Admiral Graham may refer to:

- Angus Cunninghame Graham (1893–1981), British Royal Navy admiral
- Patrick Graham (Royal Navy officer) (1915–1980), British Royal Navy rear admiral
- Stephen Victor Graham (1874–1955), U.S. Navy rear admiral
- Walter Hodgson Bevan Graham (1849–1931), British Royal Navy admiral
- William Graham (Royal Navy officer) (1826–1907), British Royal Navy admiral
