= Naval Intelligence Division (United Kingdom) =

Intelligence agency

Division overview
- Formed: 1912
- Preceding Division: Naval Intelligence Department
- Dissolved: 1964
- Superseding Division: Defence Intelligence
- Jurisdiction: Government of the United Kingdom
- Headquarters: Admiralty Building; Whitehall; London
- Parent department: Admiralty Naval Staff

The Naval Intelligence Division (NID) was created as a component part of the Admiralty War Staff in 1912. It was the intelligence arm of the British Admiralty before the establishment of a unified Defence Intelligence Staff in 1964. It dealt with matters concerning British naval plans, with the collection of naval intelligence. It was also known as "Room 39", after its room number at the Admiralty.

== History ==
The Foreign Intelligence Committee was established in 1882 and it evolved into the Naval Intelligence Department in 1887.

The NID staff were originally responsible for fleet mobilisation and war plans as well as foreign intelligence collection; thus in the beginning there were originally two divisions: (1) intelligence (Foreign) and (2) Mobilisation. In 1900 another division, War, was added to deal with issues of strategy and defence, and in 1902 a fourth division, Trade, was created for matters related to the protection of merchant shipping. The Trade Division was abolished in October 1909 in the wake of the Committee of Imperial Defence inquiry into the feud between the First Sea Lord, Admiral Sir John Fisher and former Commander-in-Chief Channel Fleet, Admiral Lord Charles Beresford, when it was discovered that the captain heading the Trade Division had been supplying the latter with confidential information during the inquiry.

In 1910, the NID was shorn of its responsibility for war planning and strategy when the outgoing Fisher created the Navy War Council as a stop-gap remedy to criticisms emanating from the Beresford Inquiry that the Navy needed a naval staff—a role the NID had been in fact fulfilling since at least 1900, if not earlier. After this reorganisation, war planning and strategic matters were transferred to the newly created Naval Mobilisation Department and the NID reverted to the position it held prior to 1887—an intelligence collection and collation organisation.

In 1912 the division was established as a component part of the new Admiralty War Staff organisation when that body was abolished in 1917 it continued as a division of the new Admiralty Naval Staff until 1964 when the Admiralty Department was abolished.

=== World War I ===
During World War I the NID was responsible for the Royal Navy's highly successful cryptographic efforts, Room 40. The interception and decoding of the Zimmermann Telegram played a role in bringing the United States into the War. It has described as the most significant intelligence triumph for Britain during World War I, and one of the first occasions on which a piece of signals intelligence influenced world events.

=== World War II ===
Naval Ultra messages were handled differently from Army and Air Force Ultra because the Admiralty was an operational HQ and could give orders during a battle; while the Imperial General Staff (Army) and Air Staff would give commanders general orders such as, "clear the enemy out of Africa" without telling them how to do it. Hence verbatim translations of naval decodes were sent by Hut 4 to the NID and nowhere else (except for some naval intelligence sent directly from Bletchley Park to Commanders-in-Chief in the Mediterranean).

Hut 8 which decrypted Enigma messages for Hut 4 to translate and analyse had less information for Ultra as the Kriegsmarine operated Enigma more securely than the German Army and Air Force. Hut 4 also broke various hand cyphers and some Italian naval traffic.

The NID also initiated the 30th Assault Unit whose role was information gathering, reconnaissance and sabotage. Members of the unit, including Ralph Izzard, are acknowledged as inspirations for Ian Fleming (who also worked for the NID) in the creation of his fictional spy, James Bond.

== Geographical section ==
The Geographical Section of the Naval Intelligence Division, Naval Staff, Admiralty, produced a series of Geographical Handbooks from 1917 to 1922 to provide information for the British Armed Forces. The Naval Intelligence Division Geographical Handbook Series was produced between 1941 and 1946 to provide information for the British Armed Forces.

== Amalgamation ==
In 1965, the three service intelligence departments were amalgamated in the new Defence Intelligence Service at the Ministry of Defence.

However, well before the mid-1990s another Royal Naval branch existed, namely the Directorate of Naval Security & Integrated Contingency Planning (DNSyICP), which is based at HM Naval Base Portsmouth under the staff command of the Second Sea Lord & C-in-C Naval Home Command.

== Directors of Naval Intelligence ==
Directors of Naval Intelligence included:

- Rear-Admiral Lewis Beaumont, 1895–1899
- Rear-Admiral Reginald Custance, 1899–1902
- Rear-Admiral Prince Louis of Battenberg, 1902–1905
- Rear-Admiral Charles Ottley, 1905–1907
- Rear-Admiral Edmond Slade, 1907–1909
- Rear-Admiral Alexander Bethell, 1909–1912
- Captain Thomas Jackson, 1912–1913
- Rear-Admiral Henry Oliver, 1913–1914
- Rear-Admiral Sir Reginald 'Blinker' Hall, 1914–1919
- Rear-Admiral Hugh 'Quex' Sinclair, 1919–1921
- Rear-Admiral Maurice Fitzmaurice, 1921–1924
- Rear-Admiral Alan Hotham, 1924–1927
- Rear-Admiral William Fisher (Acting), 1926–1927
- Rear-Admiral Barry Domvile, 1927–1930
- Rear-Admiral Cecil Usborne, 1930–1932
- Rear-Admiral Gerald Dickens, 1932–1935
- Vice-Admiral James Troup, 1935–1939
- Rear-Admiral John Godfrey, 1939–1942
- Rear-Admiral Edmund Rushbrooke, 1942–1946
- Vice-Admiral Edward Parry, 1946–1948
- Rear-Admiral Eric Longley-Cook, 1948–1951
- Rear-Admiral Sir Anthony Buzzard, 1951–1954
- Vice-Admiral Sir John Inglis, 1954–1960
- Vice-Admiral Sir Norman Denning, 1960–1964
- Rear-Admiral Patrick Graham, 1964–1965

== Deputy Directors of Naval Intelligence ==
Deputy Directors of Naval Intelligence included:

- Raymond A. Nugent, 1918–January 1919
- William M. James, January 1919–March 1920
- Geoffrey Hopwood, March 1920–April 1922
- Edward O. Cochrane, April 1922–August 1923
- George K. Chetwode, August 1923–May 1925
- Kenneth G. B. Dewar, May 1925–June 1927
- Cecil B. Prickett, June 1927–June 1929
- Alfred E. Evans, June 1929–April 1930
- Gerald C. Harrison, April 1930–April 1932
- W. E. Campbell Tait, April 1932–November 1933
- George A. Scott, November 1933–December 1935
- the Hon. Claude P. Hermon-Hodge, December 1935–February 1938
- Geoffrey C. Cooke, February 1938–February 1940
- William D. Stephens, February 1940–January 1941
- Ian M. R. Campbell, February 1941–April 1942
- Charles A. G. Nichols, April 1942–May 1944
- Ian M. R. Campbell, May 1944 – 1945
- A. Joe Baker-Cresswell, March 1948–March 1951
- Thomas J. N. Hilken, March 1951–November 1953
- Charles E. Keys, November 1953–January 1956
- George F. M. Best, January 1956–January 1958
- Nigel H. G. Austen, January 1958–September 1959
- Anthony Davies, September 1959–October 1962
- William P. B. Barber, October 1962 – 1965

== See also ==
- Ian Fleming, who worked as a personal assistant to DNI Rear Admiral John Godfrey (Inspiration for Bond's M)
- Ralph Izzard Author, adventurer, journalist, NID officer, member of the 30 Assault Unit and noted as an inspiration for James Bond.
- Merlin Minshall, who worked for Fleming in the NID, participated in several operations and has been claimed as one of the inspirations for James Bond.
- William Milbourne James, who worked closely with DNI Rear Admiral W.R. Hall and later wrote his biography.
- Ewen Montagu, who executed one of its best-known operations, Operation Mincemeat
- Jon Pertwee, who worked alongside Fleming in the NID during World War II
- Patrick Dalzel-Job, NID officer and member of the 30 Assault Unit under Fleming, noted as an inspiration for James Bond.
- Inspirations for James Bond
- Intelligence Directorate of the Main Staff of the Russian Navy, Russian Naval Intelligence
- Office of Naval Intelligence, the US Navy's intelligence arm

== Sources ==
- Allen, Matthew (February 1995). "The Foreign Intelligence Committee and the Origins of the Naval Intelligence Department of the Admiralty". The Mariner's Mirror. 81 (1): 65–78. doi:10.1080/00253359.1995.10656533.
- Briggs, Asa (2011). Secret Days: Code-breaking in Bletchley Park. Frontline Books, London. ISBN 978-1-84832-615-6.
- Dylan, Huw (2014). Defence Intelligence and the Cold War: Britain's Joint Intelligence Bureau 1945-1964. Oxford University Press. ISBN 978-0199657025.
- Pearson, John (1966). The Life of Ian Fleming. Jonathan Cape, London. ISBN 978-1-85410-898-2.
