= Patrick Dalzel-Job =

British naval intelligence officer (1913–2003)

Lieutenant-Commander Patrick Dalzel-Job
- Born: 1 June 1913; London, England
- Died: 14 October 2003 (aged 90); Plockton, Scotland
- Military career
- Allegiance: UK
- Branch: Royal Naval Volunteer Reserve
- Service years: 1939–1945
- Rank: Lieutenant-Commander
- Conflicts: World War II: Norwegian campaign

Patrick Dalzel-Job (1 June 1913 – 14 October 2003) was a British naval intelligence officer and commando in World War II. He was also an accomplished linguist, author, mariner, navigator, parachutist, diver, and skier.

Dalzel-Job is widely thought to be the model for James Bond, Ian Fleming's fictional spy, 007.

== Early life ==
Born in London, Dalzel-Job was the only son of Captain Ernest Dalzel-Job, who was killed in the Battle of the Somme in 1916. After his father's death Dalzel-Job and his mother lived in various locations, including Switzerland, and he learnt to ski and sail. They returned to the UK in 1931 where he built his own schooner, the Mary Fortune, which he and his mother spent the next two years sailing around the British coast.

In 1937, they sailed to Norway and spent the next two years exploring the coast. During this time Dalzel-Job became fluent in Norwegian. He and his mother took on as crew a Norwegian schoolgirl named Bjørg Bangsund from the city of Tromsø.

== WWII ==
On 8 December 1939, Dalzel-Job was commissioned into the Royal Naval Volunteer Reserve. He served as navigating officer on a fleet tug operating from Scapa Flow between January and March 1940. From April to June, he served with the Anglo–Polish–French Expeditionary Force to Norway. He disobeyed a direct order to cease civilian evacuations from Narvik. His action saved some 5,000 Norwegians for which King Haakon of Norway awarded him the Ridderkors (Knight's Cross) of St. Olav in 1943. This award saved him from being court-martialled.

In June 1942, Dalzel-Job was assigned to collate information about the west coast of Norway. A few months later, Lord Louis Mountbatten, head of Combined Operations, chose him to convey commando raids there, known as "Operation VP", using eight Fairmile D motor torpedo boats.

From mid-1943 until early-1944, he served with the 12 (Special Service) Submarine Flotilla, being trained on X-Craft and Welman midget submarines, while taking time to complete parachute training with the Airborne Division. As prospects for major action in Norway faded, Dalzel-Job visited London and discovered 30 AU (Assault Unit) Commando, the field operative unit of the Naval Intelligence Division—Room 30. He transferred to 30 AU under Commander Ian Fleming who was then personal assistant to the Director of Naval Intelligence. In this role and promoted to lieutenant commander, he landed near Saint-Martin-de-Varreville on Utah Beach, Normandy, on D+4 with two Royal Marine Commandos allocated to him and an unrestricted authority order signed by U.S. General Dwight D. Eisenhower to pass through Allied lines and assault specific targets in German-held territory. He subsequently assisted in disabling the German destroyer Z29 at Bremerhaven with full crew and taking surrender of the town of Bremen.

== Postwar ==
Immediately following the war, Dalzel-Job returned to England on 24 May 1945 and petitioned the Admiralty to be sent to Norway. His intent was to find Bjørg Bangsund, who had sailed with him six years earlier. In 1945 she was 19, he was 32. They wed in Oslo three weeks after he found her at Vestbane train station in Oslo. After their marriage on 26 June 1945 they returned to Edinburgh.

For a time the newly married couple lived at Onich, near Fort William, where their only child, Iain, was born. Later, the family moved to Canada, where Dalzel-Job served with the Royal Canadian Navy, and where their home was a log cabin in northern British Columbia. Returning to Scotland in 1960, they lived in Lochalsh, at Nead-An-Eoin on the shore of Outer Loch Carron. He briefly taught maths, English, and chemistry. Dalzel-Job's wife, Bjørg, died in 1986.

Their son, Iain Dalzel-Job, was to serve as a major in the 2nd Battalion, The Scots Guards and commanded G Company (7, 8, and 9 Platoons) in the assault on Mount Tumbledown during the Falklands War.

Dalzel-Job later acknowledged that Fleming had told him he was the basis for Bond, but added, "I have never read a Bond book or seen a Bond movie. They are not my style.... And I only ever loved one woman [Bjørg], and I'm not a drinking man." "I prefer the quiet life now," Dalzel-Job went on. "When you have led such an exciting life you don't need to see a fictional account of it."

He released his memoirs, titled From Arctic Snow to Dust of Normandy (ISBN 0-9519788-0-2) in 1991. It was later republished as Arctic Snow to Dust of Normandy.

== Works ==
- Dalzel-Job, Patrick (1957). The Settlers. Constable.
- Dalzel-Job, Patrick (2003). Arctic Snow to Dust of Normandy: The Extraordinary Wartime Exploits of a Naval Special Agent (Reprint ed.). Pen and Sword. ISBN 0850529018.

== See also ==
- Ian Fleming
- Inspirations for James Bond
