= No. 30 Commando =

British military intelligence unit of WW2

30 (Commando) Assault Unit
- Active: 1942–1946
- Country: United Kingdom
- Branch: Royal Marines, Royal Navy, British Army, RAF, and attached civilian specialists.
- Type: Commando
- Role: Raiding to gather intelligence
- Size: 120 all ranks
- Part of: Combined Operations
- Nickname: "Red Indians"
- Motto: "Attain by Surprise"
- Engagements: Second World War

Commanders
- Notable commanders: Lieutenant Commander Quintin Theodore Petroe Molesworth Riley

Insignia
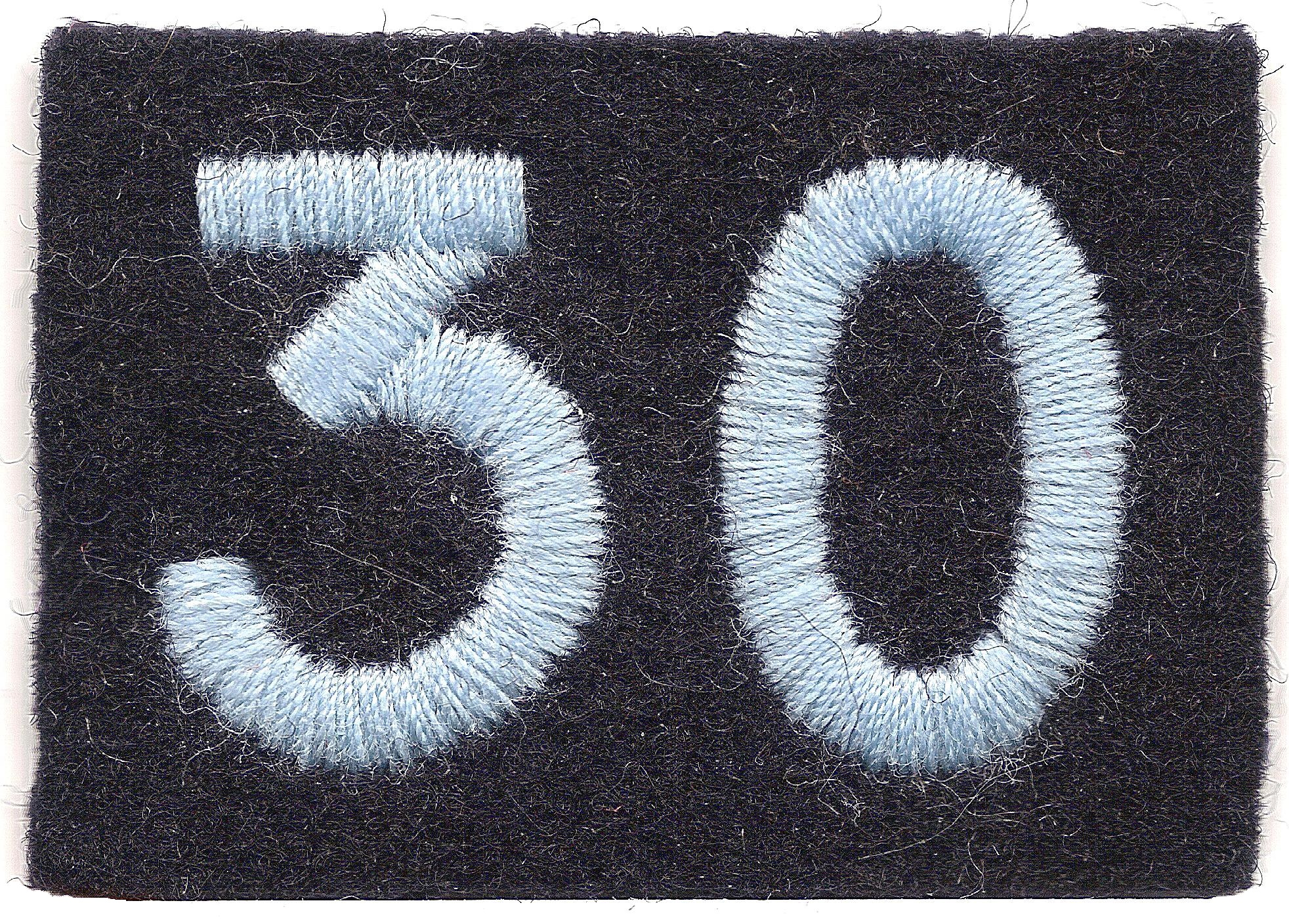
- 30 Assault Unit Shoulder Insignia

No. 30 Commando, from 1943 to 1946 known as 30 Assault Unit ("30AU"), was a British Commando unit during the Second World War, originally formed to gather intelligence.

== History ==
=== Formation ===
In March 1942, Ian Fleming of the Naval Intelligence Division proposed the creation of a commando unit to Admiral John Godfrey, the Director of Naval Intelligence. Fleming noted the objective of the unit would be, "to accompany forward troops when a port or naval installation is being attacked and, if the attack is successful, their duty is to capture documents, cyphers". The concept was based on a similar Abwehr unit named Marine-Einsatz-Kommando Schwarzes Meer that had been in existence since 1941.

According to some accounts, the unit was deployed for the first time during the Dieppe Raid in August 1942, in an unsuccessful attempt to capture an Enigma machine and related material. However, the unit's formation was officially authorised in September 1942 and initially named the Special Intelligence Unit. It comprised 33 (Royal Marines) Troop, 34 (Army) Troop, 35 (Royal Air Force) Troop and 36 (Royal Navy) Troop, and was tasked to move ahead of advancing Allied forces, to capture enemy codes, documents, equipment and key personnel.

The unit worked closely with the Intelligence Corps' Field Security sections. Individual troops were present in all operational theatres and usually operated independently, gathering information from captured facilities.

=== North Africa and Mediterranean ===
The unit took part in the Operation Torch landings (November 1942), landing to the west of Algiers at Sidi Ferruch on 8 November. They had been provided with detailed maps and photographs of the area, and on the outskirts of the city located the Italian naval headquarters. By the following day all the battle orders for the German and Italian fleets, current code books and other documents had been sent back to London.

Renamed 30 Commando and also known as the Special Engineering Unit, for most of 1943, the unit, or parts of it, operated in the Greek Islands, Norway, Sicily (Pantelleria) and Corsica. 34 Troop operated mainly in the Italian and Balkan campaigns. They captured the islands of Capri and Ischia, which was under the sole control of 30 Commando. They then seized the torpedo works at Baiae and the testing range on the nearby small island of San Martino. Its missions have reportedly remained subject to official secrecy regulations.

Perhaps the best-known member was Johnny Ramensky, a Lithuanian-Scottish safe-cracker. These units were normally inserted by parachute behind enemy lines.

=== North West Europe ===
In November 1943, the unit returned to Britain to prepare for the Allied invasion of France. It was re-designated 30 Assault Unit (30AU) in December, and re-organised into HQ Troop; A, B and X Troops; a mobile RN signals unit and a RN medical unit (apparently along de facto combined operations/joint service lines).

30AU took part in D-Day and the subsequent Normandy Campaign. One detachment, code-named Pikeforce, landed on Juno Beach. Its major task on D-Day was the capture of a radar station at Douvres-la-Delivrande, north of Caen (although the defending Germans held out until 17 June). Led by Squadron Leader David Nutting, a detachment code-named Woolforce (commanded by Colonel A. R. Wooley), landed at Utah Beach on D-Day plus 4, tasked with examining suspected German V-1 missile sites. 30AU also took part in the capture of Cherbourg. They launched an assault on Octeville – a suburb to the south west of port. This was the location of the Kriegsmarine naval intelligence HQ known as Villa Maurice which the Commandos captured along with 20 officers and 500 men.

During July 30AU made their headquarters at Carteret where captured material was studied and the force increased in men and vehicles. In August it advanced with the US 3rd Army in the breakout of Normandy. 30AU took part in the capture of Rennes, Brest and Nantes however captured documents were not of great value there. Their biggest operation however was in the Liberation of Paris – codenamed Woolforce II. Moving with speed in various scout and armoured cars and having avoided road blocks or major resistance Woolforce II entered via the Porte d'Orléans having followed the 2nd Free French armoured division. Avoiding joyous crowds 30AU crossed Pont Mirabeau and quickly cleared intelligence targets and blew open every safe box they could find. After a brief gunfight, they captured the former headquarters of Admiral Karl Dönitz, the Château de la Muette 'liberating' 30 tonnes of documents. In addition they seized the factory and underground torpedo warehouses at Houilles and Saint-Cloud. They managed to secure the acoustic torpedoes – the T5 and the experimental T10 as well as extensive technical documentation. When the Germans under Dietrich von Choltitz announced the capitulation nearly 700 Germans surrendered to 30AU.

Meanwhile 30AU (sections A and B) also conducted lesser operations in cooperation with French intelligence officers in the Toulon and Strasbourg area after they had been liberated. In September 1944, 30AU took part in the capture of Channel coast ports, often using armed jeeps. The operations carried out by 30AU in the liberation of France and Belgium provided a wealth of intelligence particularly in communications within the German military and within the German Navy. For example, how RAF Coastal Command could best deal with U-Boats in attacks via the air.

Some 30AU missions in Germany during early 1945 reportedly remain subject to official secrecy. The unit is known to have targeted military scientists, sometimes far behind enemy lines. But this is described in detail in Nicholas Rankin's book "Ian Fleming's Commandos", published 2011 (See Further reading below).

According to some sources, the secrecy surrounding 30AU was such that significant German figures, captured behind the lines by field teams from 30AU, were officially reported to have "surrendered" to Allied infantry.

=== Pacific ===
A 30AU detachment was sent to the Pacific theatre in mid-1945, although the Japanese surrender precluded actual operations. Immediately after the war, however, 30AU was reportedly active in Singapore, Indochina and Hong Kong.

=== Post war ===
30 Assault Unit was officially disbanded in 1946, however in 2010 the Royal Marines formed 30 Commando Information Exploitation Group (30 Cdo IXG RM) which carries on the history of 30 Assault Unit.

== In fiction ==
- 30 Assault Unit's commander Ian Fleming based his fictional secret agent character James Bond on the commando types and their wartime achievements. See also Inspirations for James Bond.
- The film Age of Heroes is very loosely based on the real 30 Assault Unit.

== Notable members ==
- Patrick Dalzel-Job, British Naval Intelligence Officer and Commando
- Johnny Ramensky, career criminal and noted safe blower
- Sir Charles Wheeler, broadcaster and journalist
- Ralph Izzard OBE, explorer, Naval Intelligence Officer, author
