= Conrad O'Brien-ffrench =

British Secret Intelligence Officer

Conrad O'Brien-ffrench, 2nd Marquis de Castelthomond
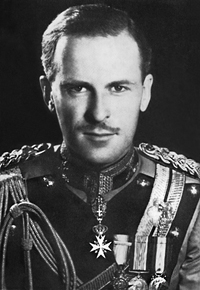
- Conrad O'Brien-ffrench c. 1919
- Born: 19 November 1893; London, England
- Died: 23 October 1986 (aged 92); Loveland, Colorado, United States
- Military career
- Allegiance: United Kingdom
- Service years: 1912, 3rd batt. Royal Irish Regiment; 1914–1919, served in World War I; 1922, captain 16th The Queen's Lancers; 1919–1920, assistant military attache at Stockholm; 1920–1921, at Helsingfors; 1922, A.D.C. to Gov. of United Provinces, India
- Rank: Captain, 16/5 Lancers
- Nickname: Eagle (Regimental nickname 1921)
- Units: Royal Irish Regiment (Disbanded 1922. Not the current Regiment created 1992); 16th The Queen's Lancers
- Conflicts: Mons, World War I
- Awards: The 1914 Star, Clasp & Emb., 13 August 1914 (Mons Star); The 1914 British War Medal (Squeak), 1914–1918; The Allied Victory Medal (Wilfred); Knight of Honour and Devotion of the Order of St. John of Jerusalem
- Other work: SIS/MI6 Agent ST36 1919–1922. He rejoined in 1930 and became an operative (Agent Z3) for Claude Dansey's Z Organization until 1938.

Conrad Fulke Thomond O'Brien-ffrench, 2nd Marquis de Castelthomond (19 November 1893 – 23 October 1986) was a distinguished British Secret Intelligence officer, captain in the Tipperary Rangers of the Royal Irish Regiment and 16th The Queen's Lancers in World War I, and Mountie for the Royal North-West Mounted Police. He was an accomplished artist, linguist, mountaineer, skier and author.

== Early life and education ==
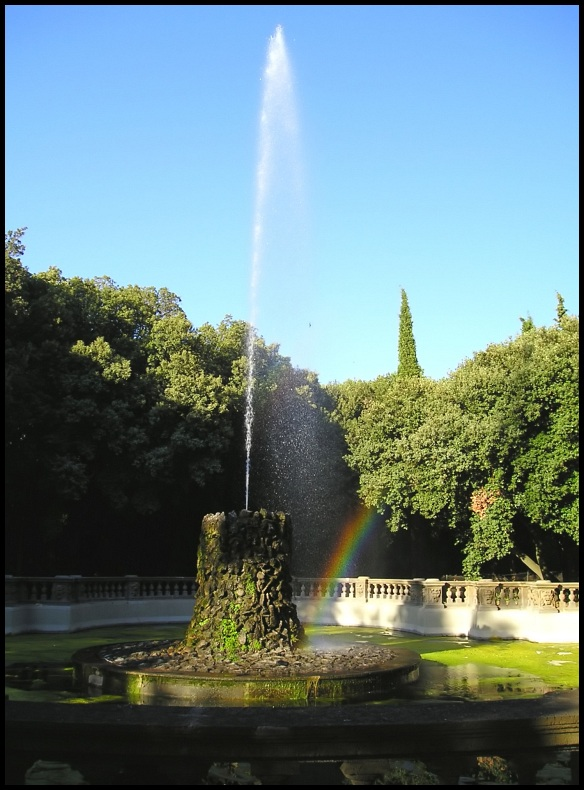
Upper Fountain, Villa Torlonia, Frascati.

Conrad Fulke Thomond O'Brien-ffrench was born in London, England, the second son of Henry Albert De Vreque O'Brien-ffrench, 1st Marquis de Castelthomond, and his wife Winifred née Thursby, heiress and daughter of Major James Legh Thursby, of Ormerod House Lancashire.

He and his elder brother Rollo (Rollo Adrien Vladimir Thursby Marie Altieri O'Brien-ffrench) spent their early childhood in Italy at Villa Torlonia, Frascati in the Alban Hills, east of Rome, and then at Piazza dell'Indipendenza in Florence, where they received private tutoring in English, French and Italian. Returning to England, Conrad joined Rollo at the Wick, a preparatory school at Hove in Sussex. After Rollo left the Wick, Conrad completed his preparatory schooling at St. Aubyns School in Rottingdean, and then attended Bradley Court Agricultural College in the Forest of Dean, where he developed his lifelong interest in horsemanship, fox hunting and other country pursuits, and became a junior member of the Ledbury Hunt. During these years his other siblings, Yvonne (Yvonne Castelthomond O'Brien-ffrench) and Alexis (Alexis Evelyn Henry O'Brien-ffrench), were born.

== Royal North-West Mounted Police ==
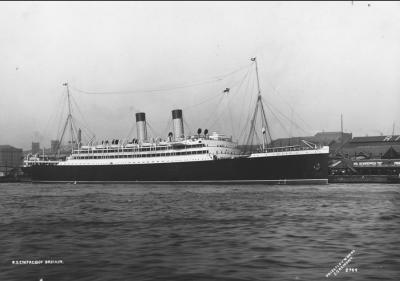
SS Empress of Britain at Liverpool, 1905.

When he was 16, Conrad's life took an abrupt turn when Rollo died in an accident playing football. Conrad left school at this time to study farming in the Evesham Valley, and while there he met a Justice of the Peace from Buffalo Lake Ranch in Saskatchewan, who told him of life on the wild frontier and of the Royal North-West Mounted Police. In April 1910, at age 17, he sailed on the Empress of Britain for Quebec and continued west to join the Royal North-West Mounted Police in Saskatchewan.

After basic training O'Brien-ffrench was posted to Cypress Hills, a remote and untamed area. He was later posted to Willow Creek and then Battle Creek, but mid-1912 received word that his mother was dying from cancer. He purchased his release and returned to Esher in Surrey to be by her side. She died the following summer.

During this time O'Brien-ffrench and friends took weekend trips to the Brooklands race track, where he was introduced to motor racing. Subsequently he purchased a 1909 Mercedes Simplex and developed a taste for fast cars.

== Military service ==
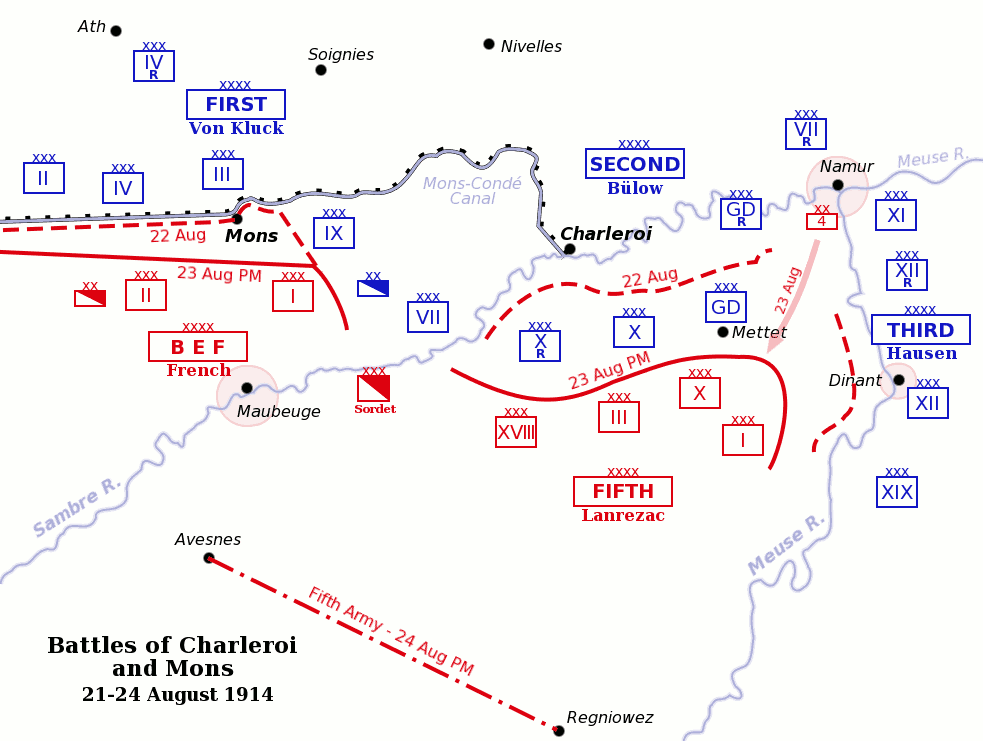
Map showing the disposition of Allied and German forces at the battles of Mons and Charleroi on 22–23 August. Notice the small salient formed by a bend in the Canal near the town of Mons. This salient would be the scene of the heaviest fighting during the battle.

=== Battle of Mons ===
Map showing the locations of the principal officers' camps.

Following his mother's death, O'Brien-ffrench travelled to his ancestral homeland in Ireland and joined The Tipperary Militia, a special reserve unit of the Royal Irish Regiment. In August 1914 he was promoted to captain and engaged in the Battle of Mons with his regiment as part of the British Expeditionary Force. On the first day of battle he was severely wounded, captured and taken prisoner. He was held first at Torgau, a Bismarckian fortress, and then at Burg de Magdeburg POW camp.

After numerous failed escape attempts, O'Brien-ffrench was transferred to what was considered an escape-proof camp at Augustabad. Here he began an exchange of letters with his friend Cathleen Mann and, through the use of invisible ink, transmitted details of troop movements and other strategic information gathered from incoming prisoners. One communication included information about a prototype German Bomber that he obtained from a captured British pilot. Mann's job as secretary to Stewart Menzies of British counterintelligence allowed a speedy relay of information through Menzies to Field Marshal Douglas Haig. Attempts were made to extract O'Brien-ffrench and the pilot to London, but these failed and O'Brien-ffrench remained in Augustabad.

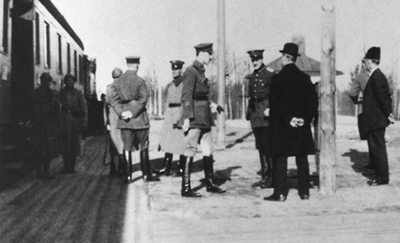
Conrad O'Brien-ffrench (profile view, centre) with Russian diplomat Leonid Krasin (in bowler hat) and twenty-five-member delegation, en route to London for talks with Prime Minister Lloyd George, 1920.

=== MI6 ===
Following World War I, O'Brien-ffrench was summoned to Whitehall in December 1918 to meet then Colonel Stewart Menzies, who recruited him into MI6. At the time, Menzies reported to Captain Mansfield Smith-Cumming, the first head of the British Secret Service, who was called "C", a designation that remains to the present day. He was posted to the British Legation in Stockholm as assistant military attaché under the command of Major Dymoke Scale. While a POW, O'Brien-ffrench had learned fluent Russian, and was now tasked with gathering information from Russian refugees fleeing the aftermath of the 1917 revolution.

In 1920, O'Brien-ffrench was assigned to escort Russian diplomat Leonid Krasin through countries hostile to the new Communist government to meet with Prime Minister Lloyd George in London for secret talks about the restoration of trade with the West. Dispatches from Lord Acton, British Minister Plenipotentiary to the newly independent Finland, confirmed arrangements for a special train to meet the delegation and under heavy guard they travelled to Turku, Finland, then Sweden to reunite with Krasin's family, en route for England. This event, the first face-to-face meeting between Russian Communist leadership and the outside world, led to the Anglo-Soviet Trade Agreement of March 1921.

Subsequently, the postwar depression and easing Soviet–British relations caused cutbacks to the Secret Service, and O'Brien-ffrench resigned from the service and returned to England.

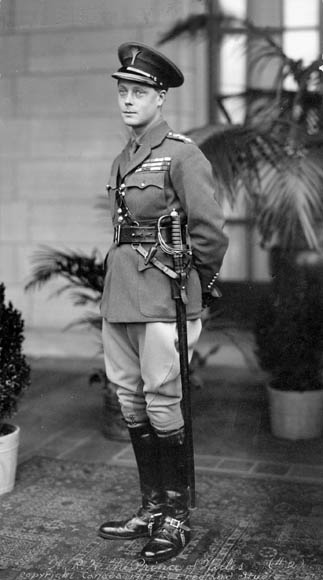
The Prince of Wales, 1919, during his Royal Tour of India (December 1921 to April 1922). O'Brien-ffrench served as an aide-de-camp to one of the British Governors on this tour.

=== India ===
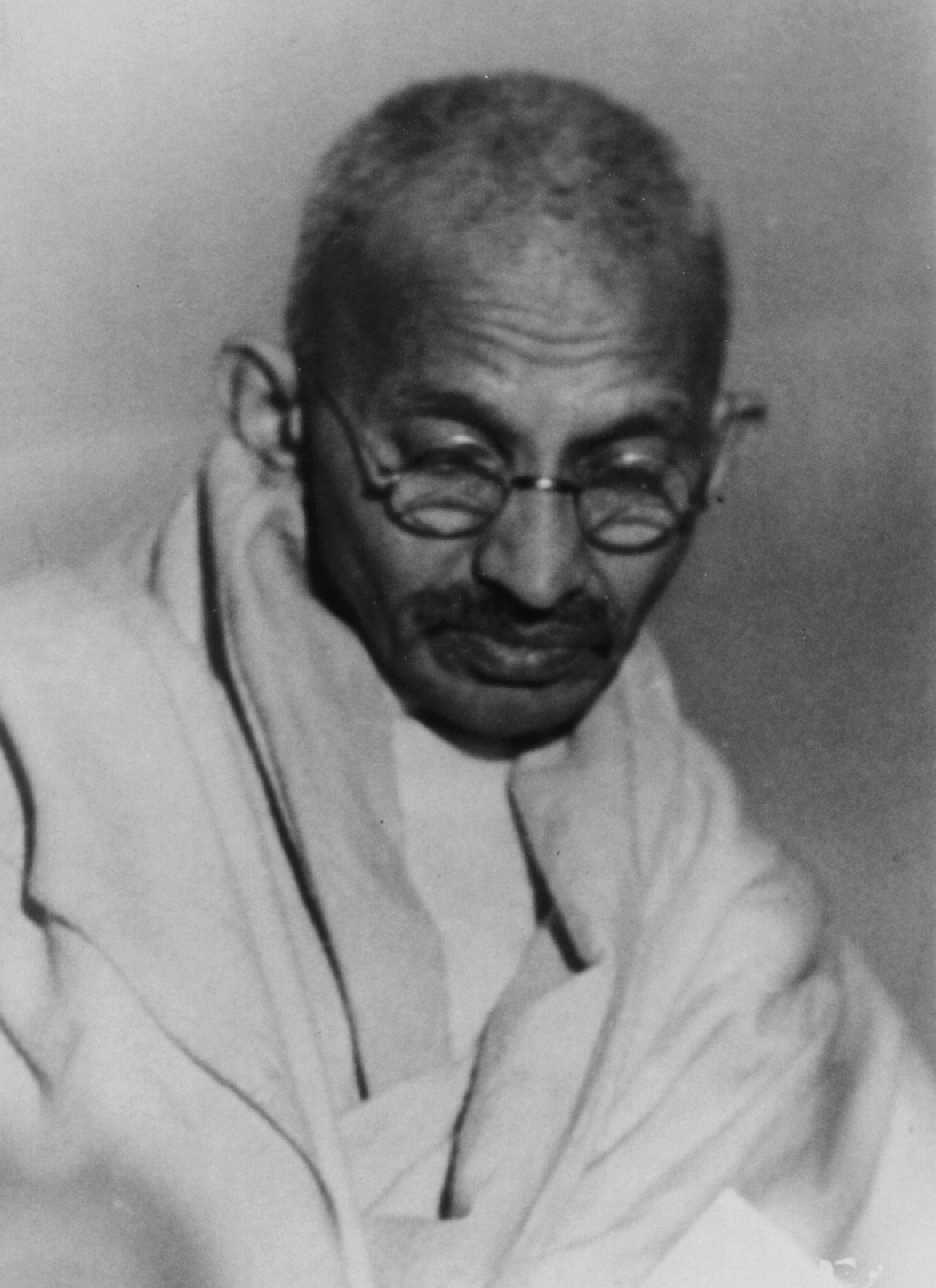
Gandhi, 1920s

Hindus and Muslims, displaying flags of the Indian National Congress and the Muslim League, collecting clothes to be burnt as a part of the non-cooperation movement, 1922

Upon his return, O'Brien-ffrench was assigned as an aide-de-camp to one of the British Governors for the upcoming Royal tour of India. Edward VIII, then the Prince of Wales, arrived in India on 21 December 1921, and stayed until April 1922. During this time the Indian National Congress of Gandhi and Nehru was in full swing, and the royal tour was dogged by passive demonstrations and riots. The heavy handed response of the British to this resistance played a part in the end of the British Raj.

In February 1922, Nehru witnessed a meeting requested by the Viceroy of India, Lord Reading (Rufus Isaacs, 1st Marquess of Reading), with the Prince to discuss the possible arrest of Gandhi. On 1 February 1922, Gandhi had written a letter to the Viceroy informing him of the Bardoli district's decision to commence mass civil disobedience and non-payment of taxes, unless the Viceroy declared a policy of non-interference with non-violent activities.

On 4 February 1922, upon learning that the sub-inspector of Chauri Chaura police station assaulted Congress volunteers at Mundera Bazar, an angry mob gathered at the station, demanding explanation from the official. While the crowd marched on, shouting anti-government slogans, police fired warning shots agitating the crowd further. In response the crowd began throwing stones at the police, who were then ordered to open fire, and killed three and wounding several others. The police retreated, some believe due to lack of ammunition, others attributing it to fear of the angry crowd. Chaos ensued and the heavily outnumbered police returned to the shelter of the thana (city hall). The crowd challenged the police to come out, and on being paid no heed, set the thana on fire, killing 22 officers, including the station officer, who were trapped inside.

Gandhi did not support the violent actions, and consequently suspended the non-cooperation movement at its peak. British officials hoped to suppress the civil disobedience by arresting Gandhi, and on 10 March 1922, Lord Reading ordered Gandhi's arrest. The initial discussion that O'Brien-ffrench witnessed was now a reality: Gandhi had been arrested, tried and jailed, but the results were not as the British intended. O'Brien-ffrench experienced firsthand the transformative influence of one man as he peacefully expressed true character, and soon the control of the British Raj gave way to India's leadership.

== Mountaineering ==
During O'Brien-ffrench's stay in India, he was introduced to mountaineering and the Himalayas. One of his more dangerous climbs was near Srinagar in the Vale of Kashmir. While climbing the Skoro La Pass, a mountain downpour created dangerous conditions, transforming the rocky cliff his party was ascending into an icy waterfall. A landslide, freezing conditions and dwindling light forced the team to rapidly forge an alternative route. O'Brien-ffrench led the team to safety, and ultimately to the summit.

O'Brien-ffrench explored the Himalayas, Austrian Alps and other ranges, meeting Sir Francis Younghusband, Frank Smythe, Sir John Hunt and Sir Edmund Hillary. In The May Mountaineer, O'Brien-ffrench describes skiing adventures among the peaks and glaciers of the Austrian Alps. When living in Banff, he often rock-climbed and skied in the Lake and Fairhome ranges. Elected to the Alpine Club in 1933, he became a lifelong member. The following are some of his earlier climbs, documented upon his nomination to the Alpine Club in London, England.

=== Expeditions ===
Year	Mountain Range	Expeditions	Notes	Images
1921	Himalayas, India	From Srinagar to Burzil Pass then over Burgi La to Scoro La and near Mango Gusor	Guide: H. Tantari	Map of the Kashmir region showing the Pir Panjal range and the Vale of Kashmir
1928	Switzerland	Glacier of Arolla (Pennine Alps, canton of Valais, Switzerland) to Mont Collon (11,932 ft /3,637 m, Pennine Alps)		Bas Glacier d'Arolla, im Hintergrund der Petit Mont Collon
1928	Switzerland	Dent de Perroc (12,057 ft /3,675 m, Wallis, Switzerland)		Photograph from the Dent de Perroc (Valais CH) taken from Evolène at nightfall
1928	Switzerland	Aiguilles Rouges (Switzerland)		Les Aiguilles de Chamonix dans le massif du Mont-Blanc, vues depuis les environs du lac Blanc, massif des Aiguilles Rouges
1928	Switzerland	Mt. Arolee (in winter)	Guide: Camille Bonnisson	
1930	Dolomites, Italy	Latimer from Col. Canon		
1930	Dolomites, Italy	Rosengarten. Gr. Cront & Pie. Gront.		
1930	Dolomites, Italy	Langkofel (10,436 ft / 3,181 m, Dolomites, Italy)		The Sassolungo (Langkofel) from the Alpe di Siusi (Seiser Alm)
1930	Dolomites, Italy	Piz Boè (10,341 ft / 3,152 m, Dolomites, Sella group, Italy)	Guide: P. Dawetz	Monte Sella view from Val Gardena, at the outmost right side the Sellatürme.
1930	Dolomites, Italy	Marmolada (10,964 ft / 3,342 m, Dolomites, Italy)		Marmolata seen from the Pordoijoch, South Tyrol
1930	Dolomites, Italy	Corono di Putla		
1930	Dolomites, Italy	Mt. Telegrafo (Cima Telegrafo, 7,238 ft / 2,206 m, Italy)		
1930	Dolomites, Italy	Pusanelle		
1931	Haute-Savoie, France	Aiguille de Tré-la-Tête (12,894 ft / 3,930 m), to Aiguille de Beranger		
1931	Haute-Savoie, France	Col de la Seigne (glacier, Mont Blanc)		
1931	Haute-Savoie, France	Col di Sanaorlis		
1931	Haute-Savoie, France	Cirque de Gavarnie (central Pyrénées)		The Cirque de Gavarnie with the Gavarnie Falls to the left.
1931	Haute-Savoie, France	McCauigon ind the Ridge from Pique de Rongeat to Cime de Pomerol	With Mrs. ffrench	
1932	Islas Canarias, Lanzarote, Spain	Monte Corona (1,985 ft / 605 m, Islas Canarias, Lanzarote, Spain)	Volcano on Islas Canarias	Monte Corona
1932		Peaks from Col de Capronale towards Cap Bianco Mountains		
1932	Corsica, région of France	Capo al Berdato (peak in Corsica, France)		
1932	Corsica, région of France	Monte Cinto (8,877 ft / 2,706 m, Corsica, France)	Highest mountain on Corsica	Monte Cinto seen from Refuge de l'Ercu, southeast, the summit is right to the center, Corsica.
1932		Theme to Asco (Haute Asco, valley in the north)		Mountains in the Asco valley in Haute-Corse
1932		Capu di u Vitullu (4,366 ft / 1,331 m, tallest summit of Les Calenche)	With Arthur Richardson Z.	
1933	Vorarlberg, Austria	Hoher Riffler (10,393 ft / 3,168 m, Verwallgruppe, Tyrol, Austria)	Highest peak of Verwallgruppe	High Riffler from the north, Verwall, Austria
1933	Vorarlberg, Austria	Pitz Burn		
1933	Vorarlberg, Austria	Fluchthorn (12,451 ft / 3,795 m, Pennine Alps, Valais Region, Switzerland)	2nd highest mountain in Silvretta Range	Fluchthorn, seen from west
1933	Vorarlberg, Austria	Sisaptauo		
1933	Vorarlberg, Austria	Zimbra (8,678 ft / 2,645 m, Rätikon, Bludenz, Austria)		Zimba summit, view from southeast
1933	Hohe Tauern Range, Austria	Schwarz Kopfit	Herras. Fritz Peterlitner	
1933	Hohe Tauern Range, Austria	Hasn Kogel		
1933	Hohe Tauern Range, Austria	Venediger Group (Hohe Tauern Range, Tyrol, Austria)	Climbed many peaks in this range	Panorama of the Venediger group from the Alte Prager Hütte, a mountain hut

== Art ==
Returning to England and to civilian life, O'Brien-ffrench explored a career in the arts. Years earlier, a hunt secretary had commissioned him to paint a series of hunting scenes that were subsequently published in a book. Encouraged by this, he studied art at the Slade School of Fine Art in London under Professor Henry Tonks (1926–1927), at the Byam Shaw School of Art under Ernest Jackson (1928–1929), and at Andre Lhote's Academy in Montparnasse, Paris (1930–1932). Student friends included Simon Elwes, Henri Cartier-Bresson, Guy Arnoux and Elena Mumm Thornton Wilson. O'Brien-ffrench worked out of his studio in the Parc Monsouri district and gained an increasing reputation for his portraits.

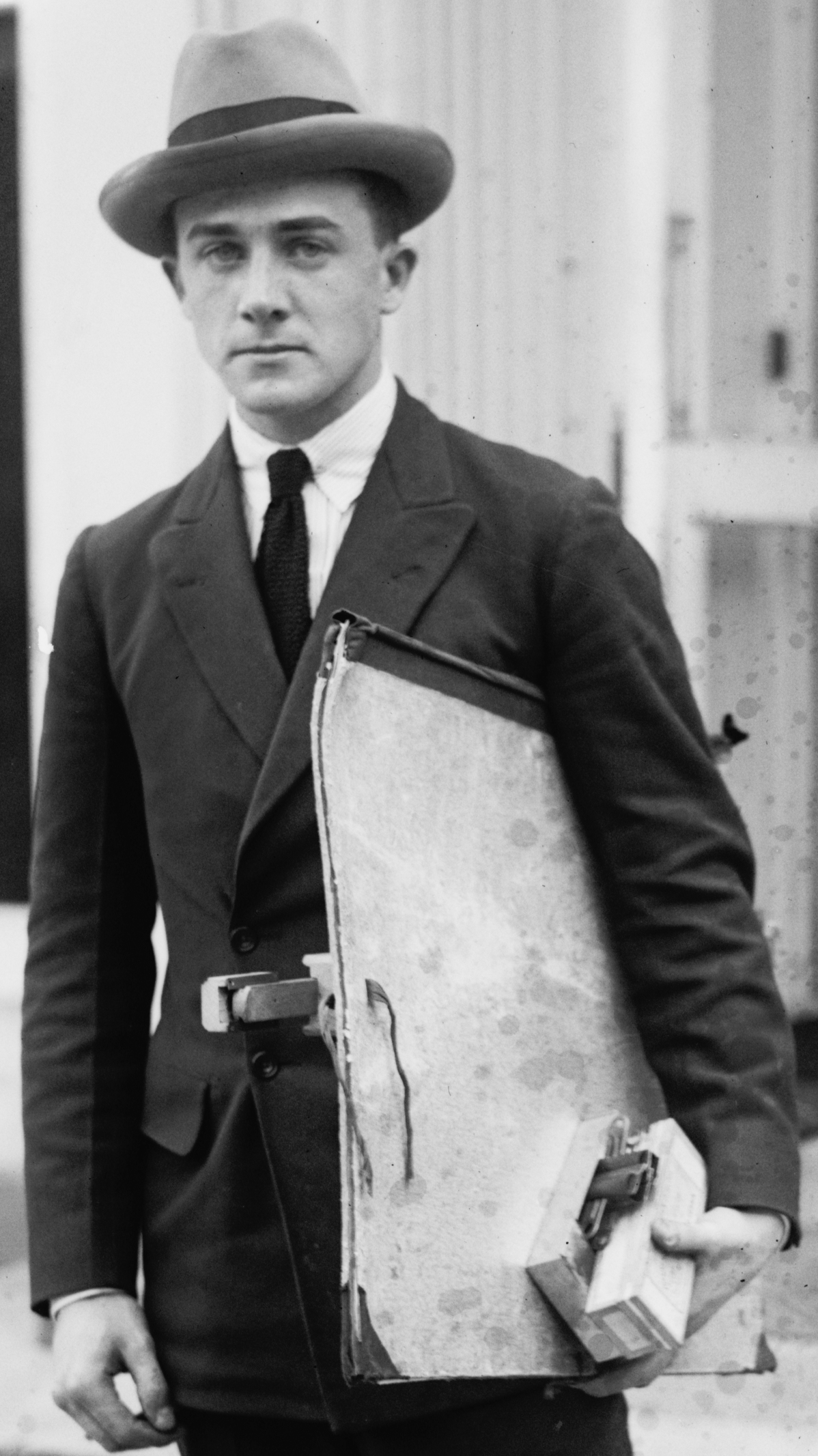
O'Brien-ffrench studied art in Paris with student-friend Simon Elwes (pictured here) a British war artist and society portrait painter whose patrons included kings, queens, statesmen, sportsmen, prominent social figures and members of Britain's Royal Family.

Upon completion of his studies, O'Brien-ffrench travelled to Jamaica with his father, painting and preparing for an exhibition at the Claridge Gallery in London. The paintings and drawings in the exhibition included Jamaican scenes, as well as portraits of H.R.H. The Duchess of Pistoia, H.S.H. The Duchess d'Arenberg, Il Duca de La Tour Corio and Il Marchese di Castlethomond.

=== Exhibitions and collections ===
O'Brien-ffrench had exhibitions in galleries and museums in Europe, Jamaica, Canada and the United States, including the following:

- The Claridge Gallery, "Conrad ffrench", London, England, 16–30 October 1930
- The Grand Salon, Group Exhibit, Paris, France, 1930's
- Art Collection of Whyte Museum of the Canadian Rockies
- Loveland Museum and Gallery, "Artistry in Living – The Life of Conrad O'Brien-ffrench", Loveland, Colorado, U.S. 1 August – 19 September 1987.
- Monivea Artisan Garden Gallery, Exhibit of Paintings by Conrad O'Brien-ffrench, Salt Spring Island, British Columbia, Canada. ongoing exhibit

=== Teaching ===
O'Brien-ffrench taught art at the Banff School of Fine Arts, Banff, Alberta, from 1948; from 1955 he was president of Rim Rock School of Fine Art, Loveland, Colorado; and, from 1975, vice president of Water Wheel Gallery, Estes Park, Colorado.

== Marriage and family ==
On 16 June 1931 O'Brien-ffrench married Maud Astrid, the youngest daughter of Colonel Bo Tarras-Wahlberg, of Stockholm, A.D.C. to King Gustav V of Sweden. They were married in Paris, honeymooned in London and Austria, and then settled in Kitzbühel, Austria, where O'Brien-ffrench continued his work with the British Secret Service. The marriage produced a daughter, Christina Laetitia, and was dissolved in 1934. O'Brien-ffrench remarried on 1 May 1945, in London, England, to Rosalie Isabelle Baker, daughter of Ralph George Baker. They moved to Canada (see Fairholme Ranch) and had two sons, Rollo and John.

== Return to Secret Service ==
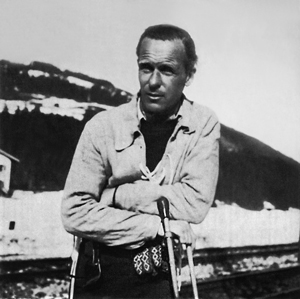
Conrad O'Brien-ffrench in 1935, Kitzbühel, Austria, where he served as Agent Z3 with the British Secret Service. It was here, on the Kitzbühel ski slopes, in local bars and homes of friends, that O'Brien-ffrench and author Ian Fleming spent time together.

O'Brien-ffrench had become a friend of Stewart Menzies, who later (in 1939) was named head of the British Secret Service. He persuaded O'Brien-ffrench to rejoin the Secret Service (now as Agent Z3), and provided him with the cover of businessman. The newly formed Secret Intelligence Service (SIS) network "Z" was taking shape under a variety of business covers, and Conrad established Tyrolese Tours offering package tours to Austria and Southern Germany. He based himself in Kitzbühel and proceeded to establish a spy network stretching from Austria deep into Southern Germany. While in Kitzbühel, Conrad met Peter Fleming and Ian Fleming, and they often crossed paths at homes of common friends, at bars, on the ski slopes or at the warm-water lake, the Schwarzsee. O'Brien-ffrench's style, athletic endeavours, personal adventures and experience in espionage may have provided Ian Fleming with some of his inspirations for James Bond. He was also in attendance to Edward VIII and Wallis Simpson, who used Kitzbühel as their first home after the abdication crisis of 1936.

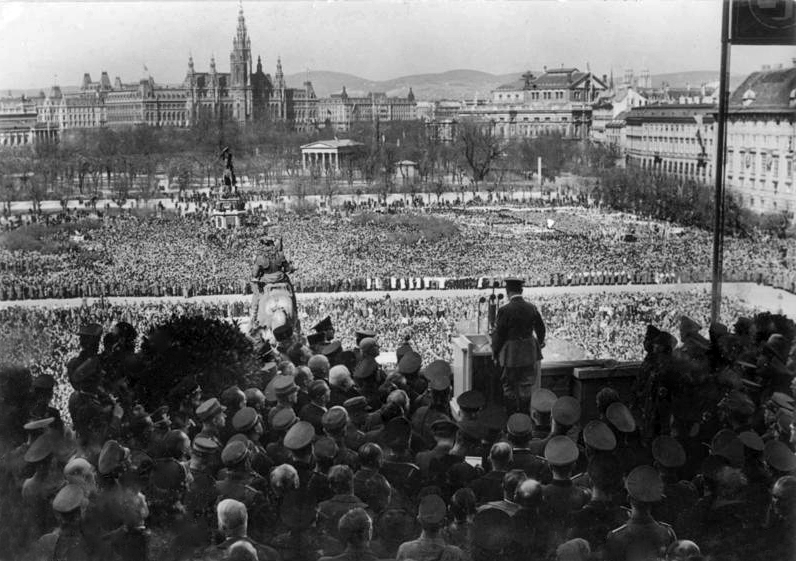
Hitler announces the Anschluss in the Heldenplatz, Vienna, 15 March 1938.

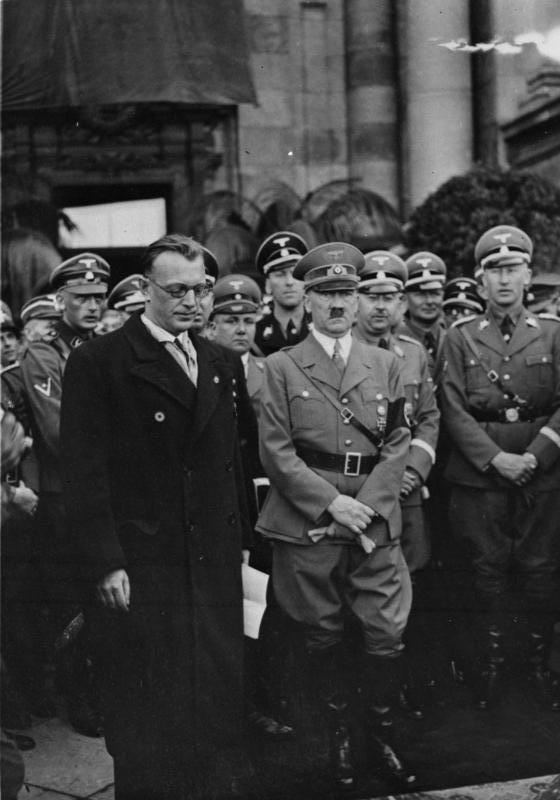
Arthur Seyss-Inquart and Hitler in Vienna, March 1938

O'Brien-ffrench provided intelligence on Nazi occultism and the build up of German forces in preparation for World War II. On Friday, 11 March 1938, he received a message from an Austrian living near the Austrian–German border, reporting that German forces were advancing from Bad Tölz and Rosenheim towards the Austrian border. The timeliness of this information is critical to political and military manoeuvres. Knowing this, O'Brien-ffrench used the most expedient method available to transmit the message, phoning the report directly to London, even though it exposed his cover. He was told that this was the first news received from Allied capitals reporting the advance. He continued to receive confirmations of the advance throughout the day. Through his local contacts he was able to warn residents, giving many in danger time to quickly pack and flee—saving lives. The ease of travel quickly changed, and by the next morning Gestapo officials were ripping soles from passengers' shoes in search of money and incriminating documents. At 9 a.m., Saturday morning, 12 March, a large force of German troops entered Kitzbühel, with another at Mittenwald to occupy Innsbruck and the country west as far as the Arlberg Pass.

Himmler's Gestapo, in 1940, prepared for Nazi Germany's invasion of Britain in World War II by compiling a list of more than 2,300 names of the most-wanted Britons in The Black Book (Sonderfahndungsliste G.B.). It includes the name of French, Marquis de Castelchomond (sic), O'Brien with the notation "brit. Agent, Kapitän." The 112th entry continues with "vermutl. England, RSHA IV E4 Stapoleit München." The Reich Main Security Office, RSHA, combined the SS Intelligence Service (the SD), Secret State Police (Gestapo), Criminal Police (Kripo) and Foreign Intelligence Service into an enormous organization, armed with the data and resources to commit mass murders. The RSHA coding system reveals the last of the entry, with "IV E4" meaning "Counter-Intelligence in Scandinavia." Conrad's cover as a spy was compromised after the Austrian Anschluss of 1938, and he retired from the intelligence services soon after.

During the war O'Brien-ffrench also served as Imperial censor in Trinidad.

== Fairholme Ranch ==
Conrad married Rosalie Isabelle Baker, daughter of Ralph George Baker, on 1 May 1945, in London, England. After World War II Conrad and his wife moved to British Columbia, and purchased waterfront property on Maple Bay, Vancouver Island. Soon they moved again to "Fairholme Ranch," a property located five miles east of Banff, Alberta and within Banff National Park's boundaries. Conrad designed and helped to build a large 14-room lodge and a cottage at Fairholme, where he and Rosie raised their sons, Rollo and John. Conrad settled down to a new life of raising horses and teaching at The Banff School of Fine Arts. Founded in 1933 by Alberta University as a school of theatrical arts, The Banff School of Fine Arts expanded its curriculum and in 1948 Conrad joined the faculty to teach visual arts.

In 1958, HRH Princess Margaret, Countess of Snowdon took up residence at Fairholme Ranch during her Canadian visit of that year. It provided splendid views of Princess Margaret Mountain named in honour of her visit.

"On 28 July the Princess drove from the ranch house where she was staying, a few miles outside of Banff, to visit the Banff School of Fine Arts, where she saw students from many parts of the Commonwealth at work."

The historic lodge was later carefully disassembled, moved and rebuilt just outside Stony Plain (near Edmonton, Alberta).

== Later years ==
Conrad lived in West Vancouver and eventually retired to his chalet in Loveland, Colorado. He taught and exhibited art, living out his years painting and lecturing art, philosophy and theology.

== Biography ==
O'Brien-ffrench, Conrad (1979). Delicate Mission, Autobiography of a Secret Agent. Skilton and Shaw (Fudge and Co. Ltd), London. ISBN 0-7050-0062-1.

Delicate Mission, Autobiography of a Secret Agent is in many collections, including:

- The Imperial War Museum
- The British Library
- Library and Archives of Canada
- White Museum of the Canadian Rockies
- The Alpine Club Library

== Interviews ==
O'Brien-ffrench, Conrad (23 October 1979). "Interview of Conrad O'Brien-ffrench". BBC Radio Nottingham (Interview). Interviewed by Dennis McCarthy. Nottingham, England.

O'Brien-ffrench, Conrad (24 October 1979). "Interview of Conrad O'Brien-ffrench". London Radio (Interview). Interviewed by Bobby Vincent. London, England.

O'Brien-ffrench, Conrad (26 June 1984). "Interview of Conrad O'Brien-ffrench". Cheyenne Today (Interview). Interviewed by Jack Savage. Cheyenne, Wyoming: KFBC.

== See also ==
- Ian Fleming
- Inspirations for James Bond
