= Johnny Ramensky =

British criminal (1906–1972)

- Born: Jonas Ramanauskas; 6 April 1906 (Note: Some sources say he was born in 1905); Glenboig, North Lanarkshire, Scotland
- Died: 4 November 1972 (aged 66); Perth Royal Infirmary, Perth, Scotland
- Other name: John Ramsay
- Occupation: Criminal
- Spouse(s): Margaret McManus (m. 1931; her death 1934 (Note: One source says that his wife did not die until 1937 and his 1934 escape was not in response to her death.)); Lisa or Lily Mulholland (unknown)
- Military career
- Allegiance: United Kingdom
- Branch: British Army
- Service years: 1943–1946
- Units: Royal Fusiliers; Commandos
- Conflicts: World War II
- Awards: Military Medal

Johnny Ramensky MM, also known as John Ramsay, Gentleman Johnny, and Gentle Johnny (6 April 1906 – 4 November 1972) was a Scottish career criminal who used his safe-cracking abilities as a commando during the Second World War. A popular song about him, "The Ballad of Johnny Ramensky", was written in 1959 by Norman Buchan, later to become a Labour Party member of parliament, and recorded by singer Enoch Kent, Buchan's brother-in-law. Though a career criminal, Ramensky received the nickname "Gentle Johnny" as he never used violence when being apprehended by the police.

== Early life ==
Ramensky was born Jonas Ramanauskas or Yonas Ramanauskas, the son of Lithuanian immigrant parents, at Glenboig, a mining village in North Lanarkshire, near Coatbridge. His father died when Ramensky was about eight and the remaining family moved to the Gorbals, in the south side of Glasgow. In Glasgow, he attended Rutherglen Academy, and by eleven he had begun committing crimes, eventually, at the age of 15, 16 or 18, being sent to Polmont Borstal, spending three years there.

He initially worked down the coal mines, similar to his father who had been a clay miner, and it was there he became familiar with the uses of dynamite.

== Criminal career ==
Throughout his life, Ramensky demonstrated great strength and gymnastics skills which he used to begin a career as a burglar, followed by graduating to safe-cracking, also known in the underworld as a "Peter man". During his criminal career, Ramensky maintained that he never targeted individuals' houses but only businesses and he became known for never resorting to violence despite being arrested numerous times, resulting in the nickname "Gentleman (or Gentle) Johnny". Detective Superintendent Robert Colquhoun, one of his old adversaries, when taken ill, was sent a message by Ramensky wishing him a speedy recovery, suggesting he had been working too hard in pursuing him.

In October 1931, Ramensky had married Margaret McManus and appears to have stayed out of trouble until March 1934 when he was sentenced to five years at HM Prison Peterhead. According to several reports, Margaret died in 1934 and, after being denied parole to attend her funeral, Ramensky made his first escape on 4 November 1934. His escape, the first ever from Peterhead Prison, was short lived. He travelled between 24 and 35 km (15 and 22 mi) and was caught 28 hours after his escape.

After being returned to prison he was placed in solitary confinement and shackled. Later in 1934, Independent Labour Party MP for Glasgow Shettleston, John McGovern, brought up the shackling issue with Godfrey Collins, the Secretary of State for Scotland. In December 1934, Ramensky was released from his shackles, making him the last man to be shackled in a Scottish prison cell.

== Military ==
Ramensky was released after serving a sentence in Peterhead Prison on 8 October 1942. During his time there, he had written to officials seeking references to join the army. Due to the intervention of a senior police officer from Aberdeen, he had attracted the interest of Robert Laycock who was seeking people with skills which could be used in commando raiding forces. As a result, he was enlisted with the Royal Fusiliers in January 1943 and transferred immediately to the Commandos, where he was trained as a soldier whilst also instructing on the use of explosives. Although being officially enlisted with the Royal Fusiliers, he never actually served with them, spending his entire wartime service with the No. 30 Commando.

Ramensky, using his safe-blowing skills, performed sabotage missions, being parachuted behind enemy lines to retrieve documents from Axis headquarters. This culminated during the Italian campaign, where 14 embassy strong boxes or safes were opened in only one day. The exploits may have been exaggerated as they supposedly include obtaining documents from Erwin Rommel's headquarters in North Africa, and Carinhall the county home of Hermann Göring in the Schorfheide-Chorin Biosphere Reserve. However, the raid on Rommel's headquarters occurred in 1941 while Ramensky was in prison. Carinhall's treasures were removed before the home was destroyed by a Luftwaffe demolition squad, on Göring's orders, while Ramensky was in Italy.

He remained in the army after the cessation of hostilities as a translator for the allied forces who were repatriating approximately 70,000 Lithuanians from camps in the Lübeck area. Following this, he had a short spell as an officer's batman before being demobbed in 1946.

== Later life and death ==
Ramensky did not give up his safe-cracking lifestyle and spent the time after the war in and out of jail, including HM Prison Barlinnie and Saughton Prison. In 1955, he remarried to Lisa or Lily Mulholland.

He was sentenced to a one-year sentence in Perth Prison, after being caught on a shop roof in Ayr. After suffering a stroke he died on 4 November 1972 in Perth Royal Infirmary.

== Hidden loot ==
Ramensky's friend Sonny Leitch, also a career criminal who served in the armed forces, said that Ramensky told him that he had stolen a hoard of Nazi plunder during the Allied march on Rome in 1944, and that this hoard was later kept at the Shepton Mallet military prison in Somerset, and the Royal Navy supply depot at Carfin, Lanarkshire, after the war. He claimed that the hoard contained portraits of Hitler, Eva Braun, Göring, Goebbels and Himmler, and a treasure trove of jewellery and gold.

== Legacy ==
In 1959, The Ballad of Johnny Ramensky, was written by Norman Buchan, later to become a Labour Party member of parliament, and recorded by singer Enoch Kent, Buchan's brother-in-law.

Roddy McMillan, noted Scottish actor, wrote Ramensky Must Go Free sometimes given as Let Ramensky Go.
