= Merlin Minshall =

British naval intelligence officer (1906–1987)

Lieutenant-Commander Merlin Minshall
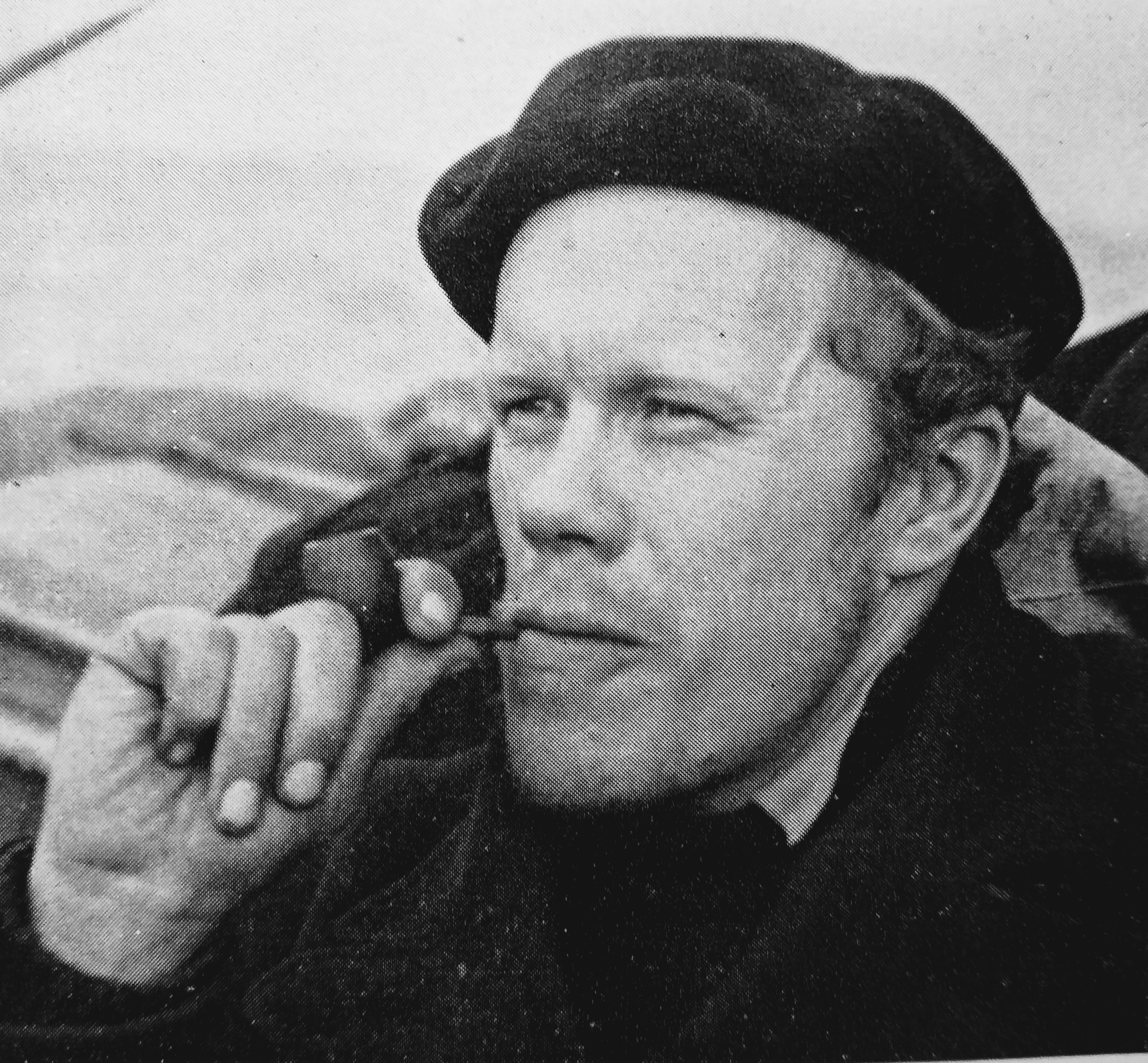
- Escaping from France by sea November 1940

Personal details
- Born: 21 December 1906 Ottershaw, Surrey
- Died: 3 September 1987 (aged 80) King's Lynn, Norfolk
- Spouse(s): Elizabeth Loveday; Isolde Llewellyn; Janine Paulette Sergent of Lyons; Christina Marjorie Zambra
- Education: University College, Oxford
- Awards: Mention in Dispatches

Military service
- Allegiance: United Kingdom
- Branch/service: RNVR Royal Navy
- Years of service: 1939–1945
- Rank: Lieutenant-Commander
- Unit: Naval Intelligence
- Commands: Operation Shamrock (Gironde 1940)
- Battles/wars: Second World War

Merlin Theodore Minshall (21 December 1906 – 3 September 1987) was a British naval officer and adventurer. He is often claimed to have been one of the inspirations behind James Bond, the fictional spy created by Ian Fleming. Minshall worked for Fleming during the Second World War, as a member of the Royal Navy's Naval Intelligence Division.

== Life ==
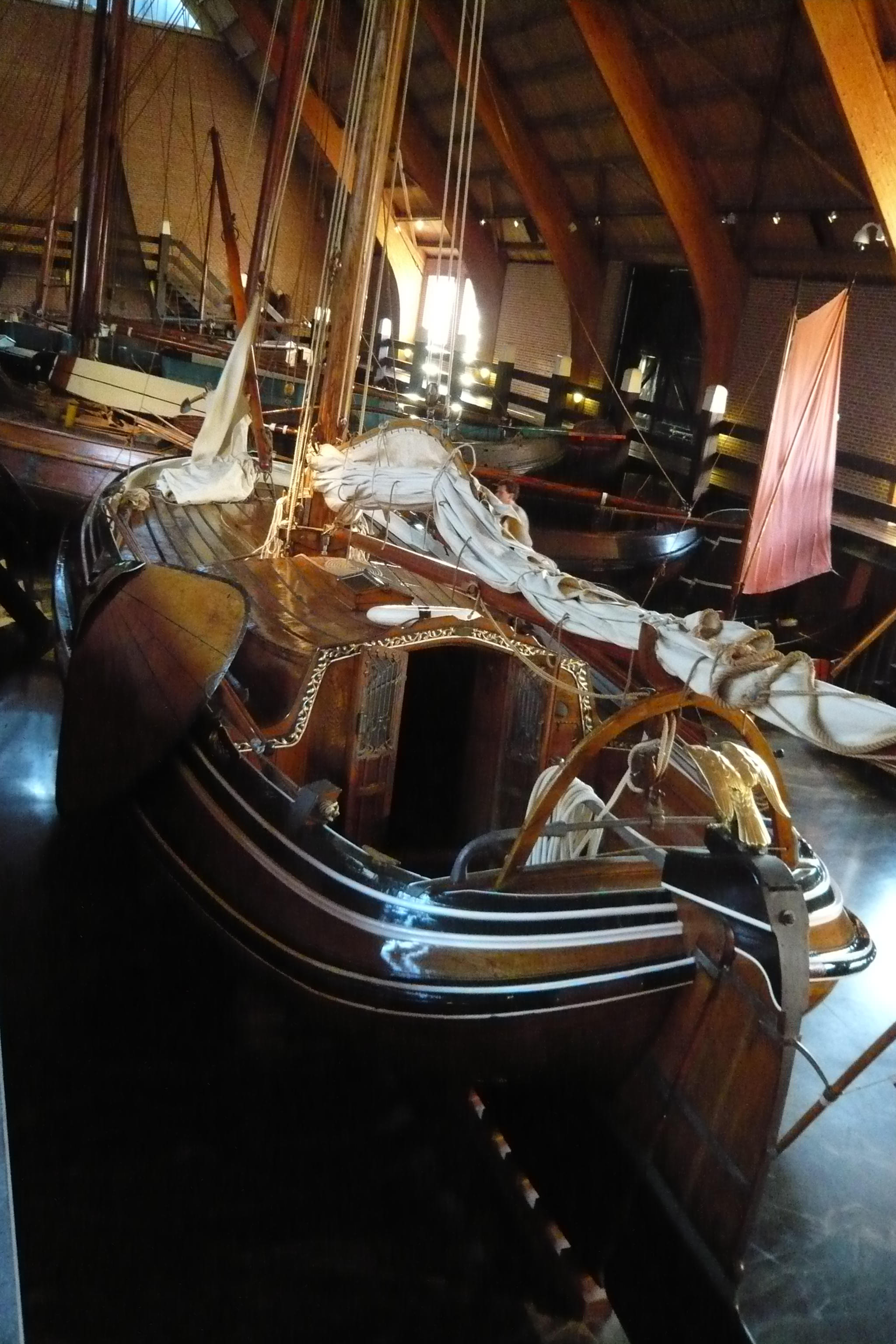
Enkhuizen Netherlands Zuiderzee Museum ships hall with the boeier Sperwer oe owned by Merlin Minshall

Son of Colonel Thomas Herbert Minshall, DSO (1873–1971), a well-known consultant electrical engineer and newspaper proprietor and Theodora Minshall née Wigham-Richardson (1871–1932), who worked for the British Secret Service during the First World War. He was educated at Charterhouse and University College, Oxford. Upon graduation Minshall trained as an architect at London University, before embarking on his boat the Hawke (formerly known as Sperwer, which is Dutch for Hawke, and on display in the Netherlands in the indoor museum of the Zuiderzee Museum in Enkhuizen) on his quest to be the first Englishman to sail across Europe to the Black Sea. Minshall acquired the Hawke in Bosham, from Gerald Hulse in 1931 in exchange for a sports car. Hulse had only purchased the Hawke the year before from Dr. Marmaduke Fawkes who had owned the boat since 1926, having brought it over from the Netherlands. Minshall was accompanied by his first wife, Elizabeth, but they separated during this trip and were later divorced.

The subsequent encounter with the German agent, Lisa Kaltenbrunner, came while sailing down the River Danube. She hitched a lift on his yacht – but it was no coincidence. She had been sent to discover whether he was charting the river and investigating oil storage depots for British intelligence. Having seduced him, she attempted to poison him, but Minshall survived, and the knowledge he had gained did indeed prove useful to the British in a subsequent operation during the war.

Minshall was also well known as an amateur racing driver, who specialised in the kind of road races that are generally illegal today. A two-time competitor in the Monte Carlo Rally, his greatest triumph came in 1937, when he was presented with a trophy by Benito Mussolini for winning the 1937 Italian Foreign Challenge Trophy – a three-day, 4,000-mile road race between Rome and Sicily. It involved over 400 cars and led to the death of four drivers. He was also the first man to drive an air-cooled vehicle north to south across the Sahara desert.

At the outbreak of World War II, he was recalled to duty as part of the RNVR, where he had a varied career, including working for Ian Fleming. Initially, he was a watchkeeper in the Admiralty operations room in London. In early 1940, he was a major participant in the failed scheme to block the Danube in Romania to disrupt German oil imports, working under diplomatic cover as British Vice Consul in Bucharest. Later, in November 1940, leading a joint NID/SOE team Minshall ran Operation Shamrock, where a commandeered fishing smack was used as an observation platform for monitoring German U-boat traffic in the Gironde estuary. Minshall was Mentioned in Dispatches for his part in commanding that operation.

Subsequently, he ran a section at HMS Flowerdown, using direction finding and transmitter analysis ("Z machines") to identify the positions of individual ships. As such, during May 1941 he played a part in the hunt for the Bismarck. Posted to Fiji, he managed to get his posting changed to New Zealand, where he worked on various intelligence projects, including establishing a Z machine intercept station at Rapuara near Blenheim. Recalled to the UK, he was landed in occupied Yugoslavia as officer in charge of the Allied Naval Mission to Tito in Yugoslavia.

Minshall was married four times, the first to Elizabeth Dorothy Magdalene Loveday, from whom he was divorced in 1935. His second wife was Isolde Llewellyn, his third Janine Paulette Sergent of Lyons and fourth Christina Marjorie Zambra, great niece of the Scottish artist Harrington Mann, with whom he had four sons, Peter, Matthew, Luke and Timothy.

== Autobiography ==
Minshall wrote about his life in a book entitled Guilt-Edged, published in 1975. Its content is summed up by Len Deighton in the foreword:

"His mother was an spy in World War I. Ian Fleming was his boss throughout the Second World War. Unwittingly sucked into the world of Nazi espionage during an innocent sailing trip, he was seduced by a lovely but lethal German agent and met Field Marshal Göring face to face. He was the first man to cross the Sahara on a motorcycle and while travelling through the Congo, he accidentally discovered a secret German army. But Romania set the scene for the height of espionage activity – when he single handedly pirated a ship from under Nazi eyes and blew up a vital link in German tanker communications. The man is Merlin Minshall and this is his unique story."

== See also ==
- Inspirations for James Bond
