= Zuiderzee Museum =

Museum in Enkhuizen, Netherlands

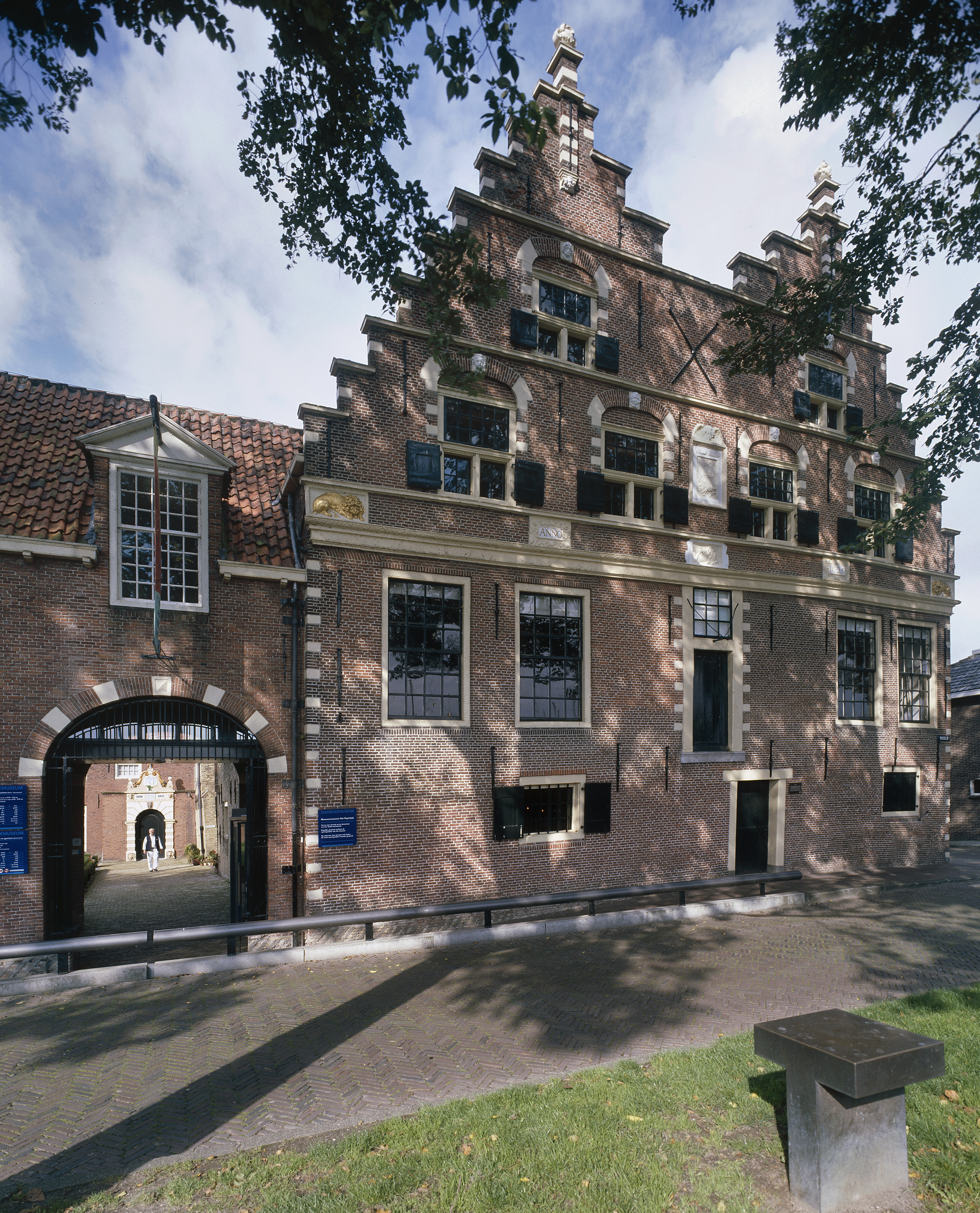
- Entrance to the "indoor" museum on the Wierdijk. The right corner building is the front of the 'Peperhuis' (Pepper house).
- Location: Enkhuizen
- Coordinates: 52°42′24″N 5°18′01″E
- Website: zuiderzeemuseum.nl?lang=en

The Zuiderzee Museum (Dutch: Zuiderzeemuseum), located on Wierdijk in the historic center of Enkhuizen, is a Dutch museum devoted to preserving the cultural heritage and maritime history from the old Zuiderzee region. With the closing of the Afsluitdijk (Barrier Dam) on May 28, 1932, the Zuiderzee was split in two parts: the waters below the Afsluitdijk are now called the IJsselmeer, while the waters north of it are now considered to be part of the Waddenzee.

== History ==
Enkhuizen possesses a considerable fishing fleet and has some shipbuilding and rope-making, as well as market traffic.

— Encyclopædia Britannica article on Enkhuizen, 1911

Three crowned herrings in the shield of Enkhuizen carried by the city virgin

Enkhuizen is called 'Haringstad' (Herring Town) and was an important fishing port for centuries until the Zuiderzee was closed off in 1932 by the construction of the Afsluitdijk. The fishing grounds were now fresh-water and the fish changed from fish like herring and anchovy to eel, smelt and red perch. Nowadays, eels are rare in the IJsselmeer; the most probable causes are water pollution, and the industrial fishing of their offspring ("glass eels" due to their transparency) during their travels back to Europe from the eels' breeding waters in the Sargasso Sea for rearing in land-based containers. The large number of cormorants in the region also feed off eel.

== History of the Zuiderzeemuseum ==
The impetus for the founding of the Zuiderzeemuseum in Enkhuizen was an exhibition that was held around 1930 in the park along the sea wall. In this Zuiderzee Visscherij Tentoonstelling (Southern Sea Fishing Exhibition) (ZVT) were displayed cardboard houses and costumed locals from around the Zuiderzee. The plans for a museum were put on hold as the threat of war rose (and as it subsequently broke out). In the summer of 1949 the first exhibition was set up in the Drommedaris, the 16th century defensive tower in the harbour; this marked the birth of the indoor part of the museum.

Due to the success of this exhibition, the Zuiderzeemuseum obtained warehouses on the Wierdijk (including the Peperhuis) from seed company Sluis & Groot for the symbolic amount of 1 guilder. The Dutch government eventually took over these buildings and restored them, and maintains them until today.

== The indoor museum ==
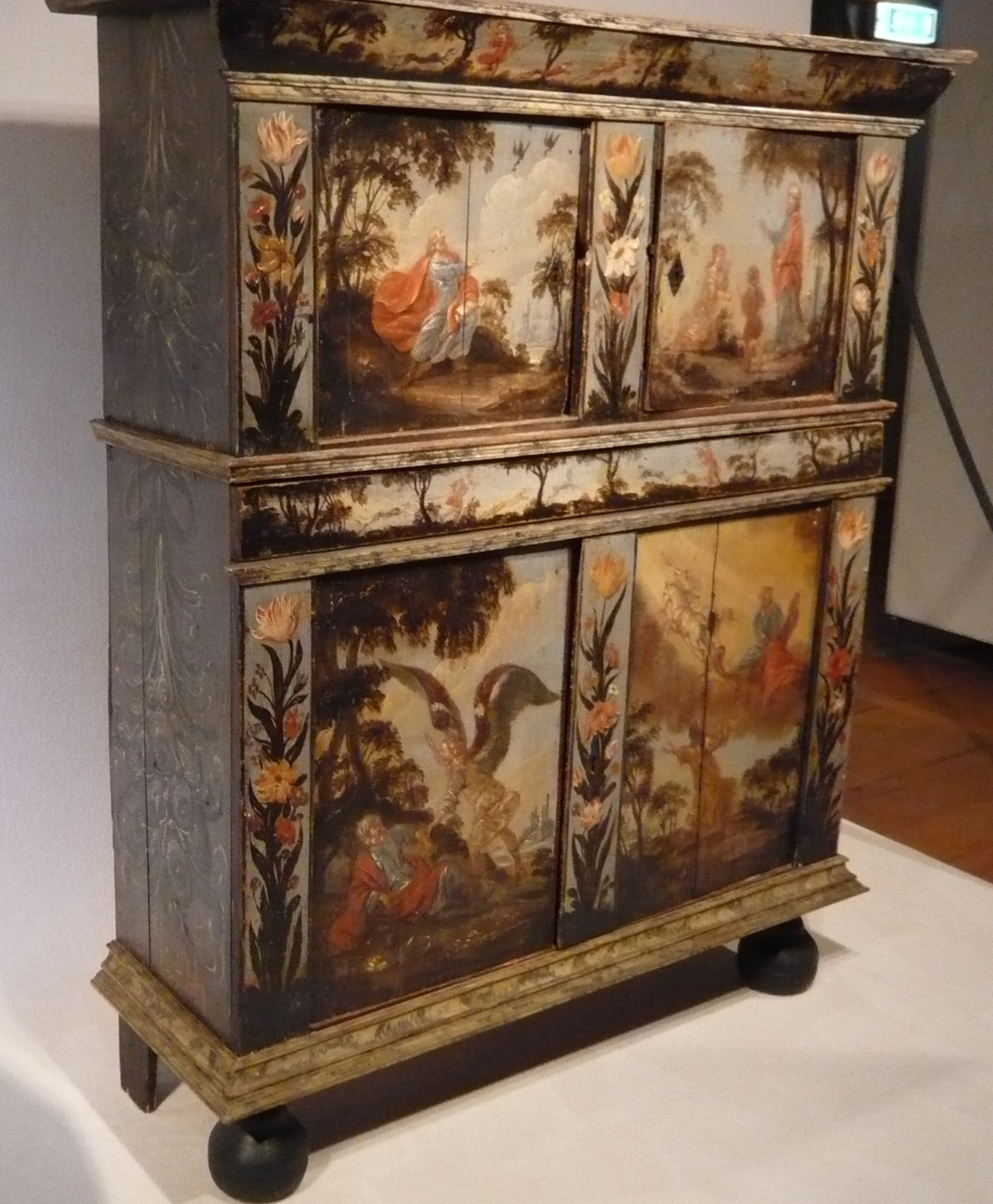
Often on display is the 18th century chest (Assendelfter kast) painted with scenes from the life of Old Testament prophet Elijah

The indoor museum was opened on July 1, 1950. It consists of a string of (original and replicated) 17th century buildings of which some were used by the VOC and contains both temporary exhibitions as well permanent installations. Most notably is the 'Schepenhal' (ship's hall), which allows visitors a close-up view of some of the more common historical types of boats from the Zuiderzee's rich fishing industry as well as some recreational sailing ships. Among these beautiful boats is the Sperwer (sparrowhawk), a 'boeier' once owned by the English adventurer Merlin Minshall, who sailed this boat from England over the Danube to the Black Sea in the 1930s for his honeymoon, and a second time for the English secret service. Also a historic 'Midzwaardjacht' (Centreboard) is on display.

The indoor museum also displays artifacts from other aspects of the Zuiderzee cultural past, including paintings, furniture and traditional, locally-worn costumes ('klederdracht').

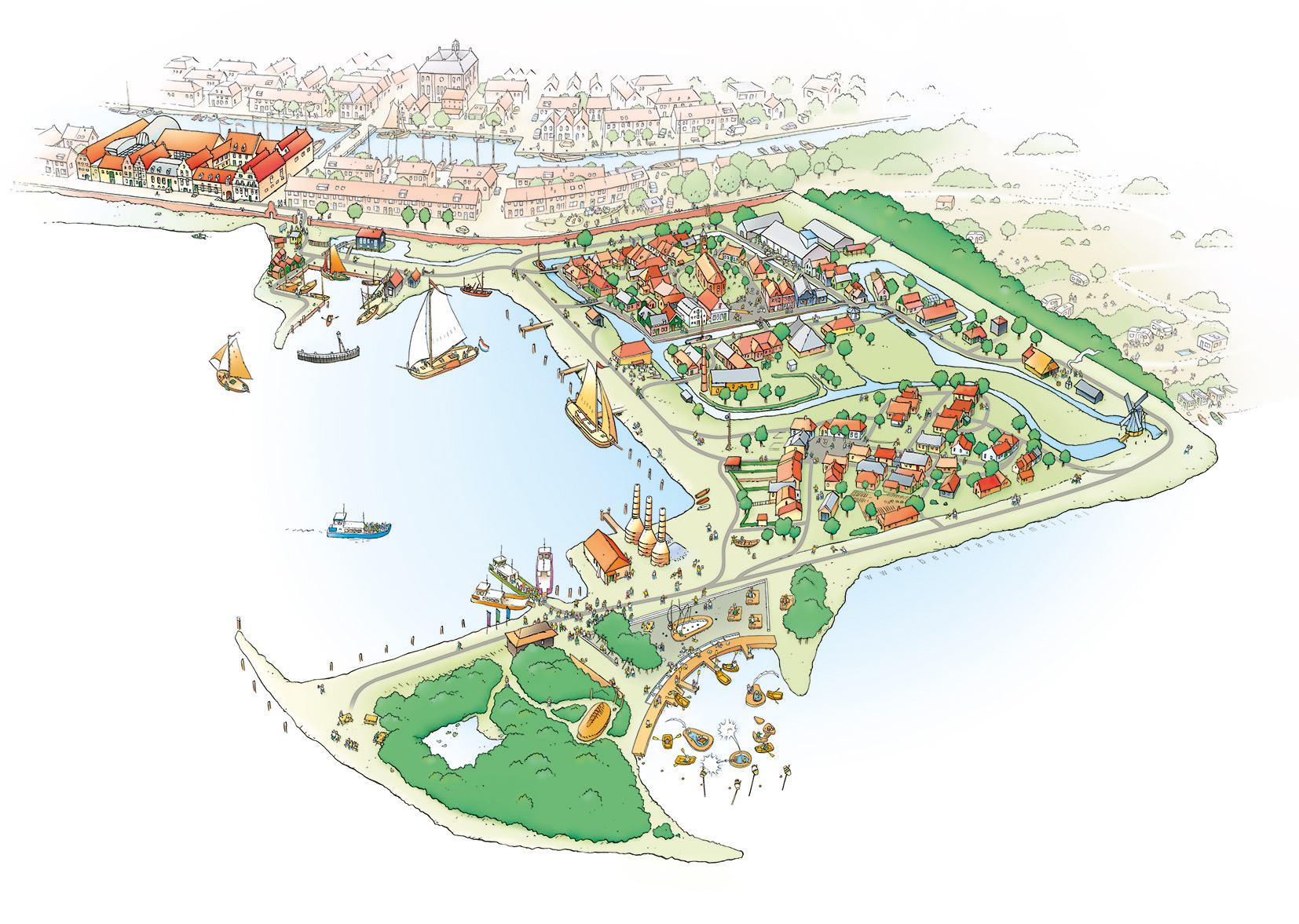
View showing the locations of the Indoor museum (top left) and the Outdoor museum (below right)

== The outdoor museum ==
Then-Queen Beatrix opened the outdoor museum on May 6, 1983, as a new extension of the Zuiderzeemuseum. Until 1970, its location had been in use as a storage area for the Zuiderzee Works.

The museum village was set up to mimic the architecture and 'atmosphere' of villages around the former Zuiderzee: buildings ranging from the north of Groningen all the way down the coast to the island of Wieringen are represented. Most of the buildings are authentic—sometimes even transported in whole in a steel frame—while some, like the wharf and the house 'Siberie' from the island of Marken, are replicas of the original buildings. Although the first acquisition for the museum already had gone through in 1948, the first building actually on display was the 'Gasthuiskapel' (hospital chapel) from Den Oever, in 1971. The first building acquired (a 'dijkhuis' (dike house) from Hindeloopen) was kept in storage, in parts, for 32 years, and its interior was exhibited for many years in the indoor museum containing Hindeloopen costumes and furniture. Nowadays, it is located along the dike of the outdoor museum and houses a pub.

A large variety of buildings are on display in the outdoor museum: wind mill, lime kilns, fish-smoking house, steam laundry, drugstore, pharmacy, basketmaker, blacksmith, cheese warehouse, school, and hairdresser's, amongst others. The harbor is a replica of its layout on Marken before enlargement there. Some aspects of local Zuiderzee history are also on display, especially during the period from April to November with typical old Dutch activities, like old games and building clog boats, and demonstrations of ancient crafts such as rope-making, cooperage, basket making and herring smoking. In the village of Urk, life around 1905 is enacted through role play.

== Restaurants and pub ==
Both 'indoor' and 'outdoor' museum have several restaurants located in National Heritage sites, like the Hindeloopen pub, the Amsterdam house and the Pepper House on the Wierdijk.

== Opening hours ==
The indoor Zuiderzeemuseum Binnenmuseum is open the year round, while the outdoor 'Buitenmuseum' is open every day from Easter to late October, from 10 a.m. to 5 p.m.

== Transit to and from the museum ==
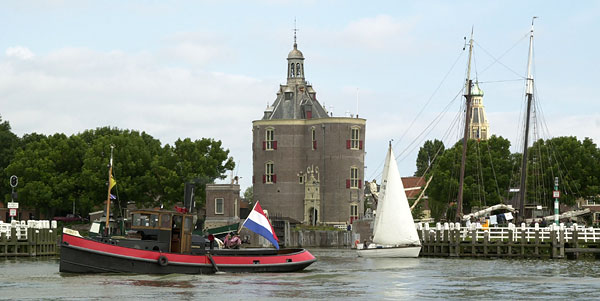
Enkhuizen seen from the ferry to the open-air museum with the Drommedaris and Zuidertoren in the distance

The official parking is located at the entrance of the road to Lelystad (along the dike). From the indoor museum, transfer to the outdoor museum is possible by ferry or by foot. In the old city center of Enkhuizen parking is free on Sunday only, although parking for free is available on every weekday behind the railway station (at walking distance from the indoor museum).

The Enkhuizen train station can be reached by intercity with Amsterdam Centraal station within 1 hour. Transfer to the indoor museum is available by ferry every 30 minutes.

== Gallery ==
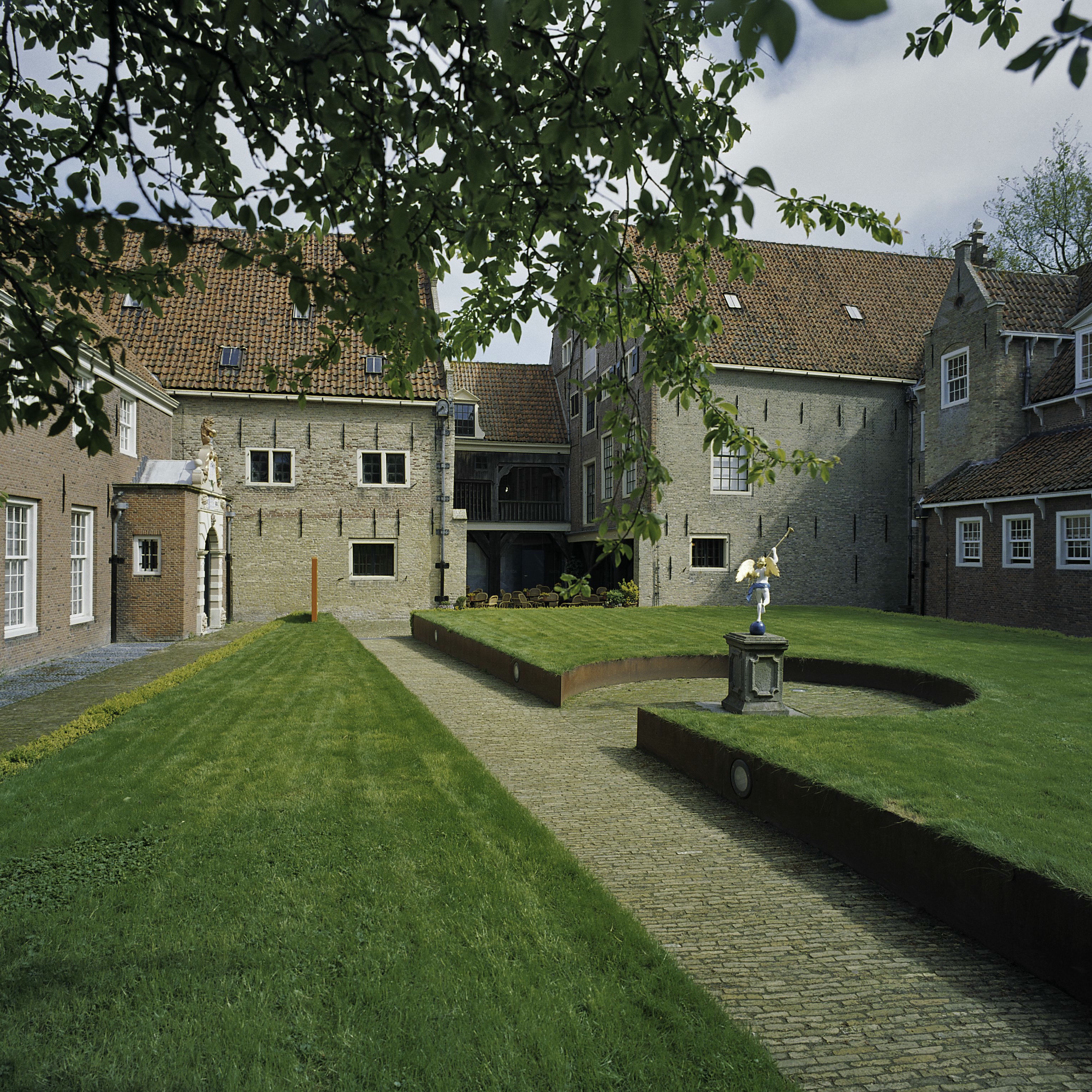
Courtyard of the museum

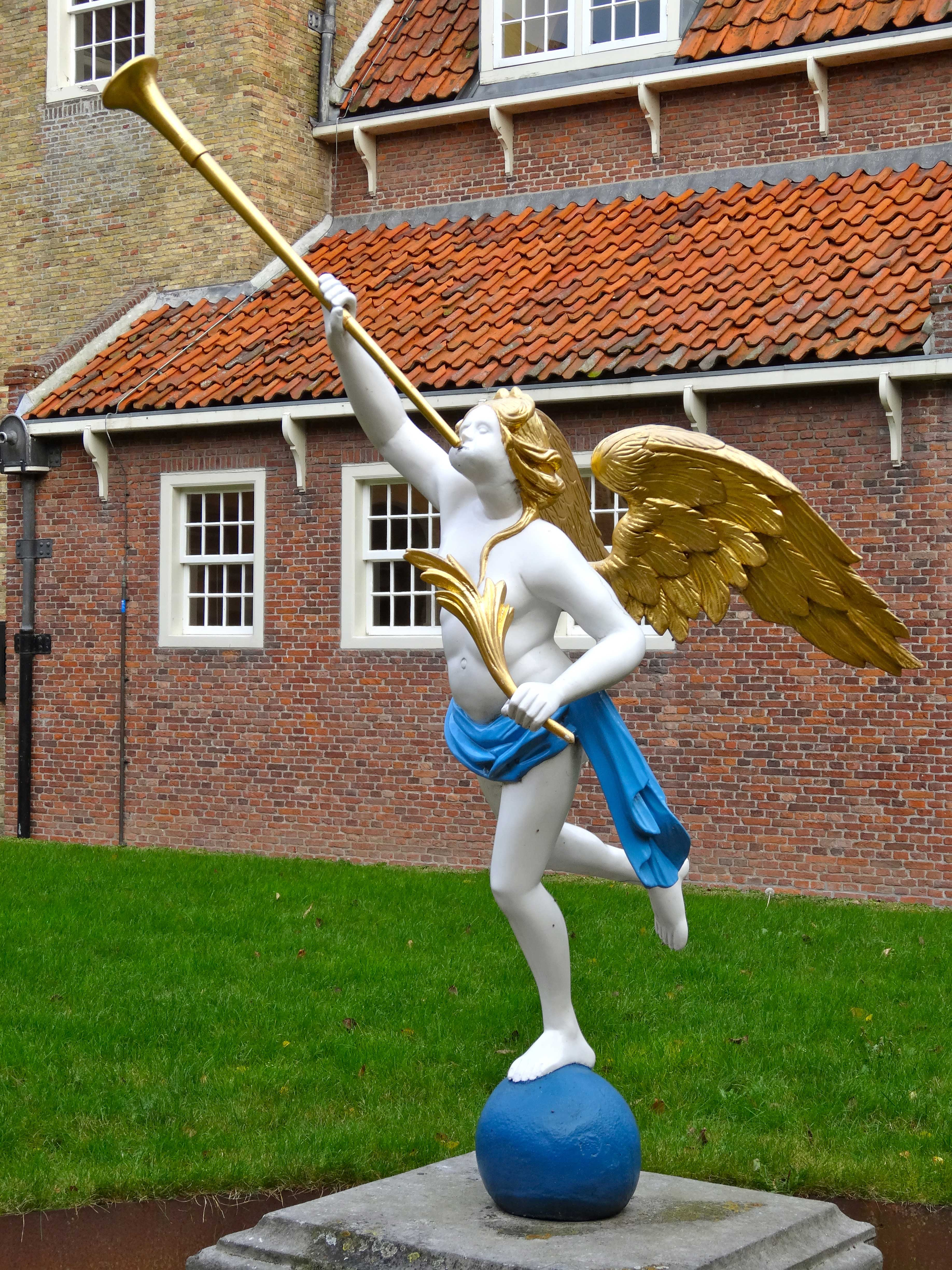
Pheme in the courtyard of the museum. Copy made after the original on top of a gate in the Zaanstreek

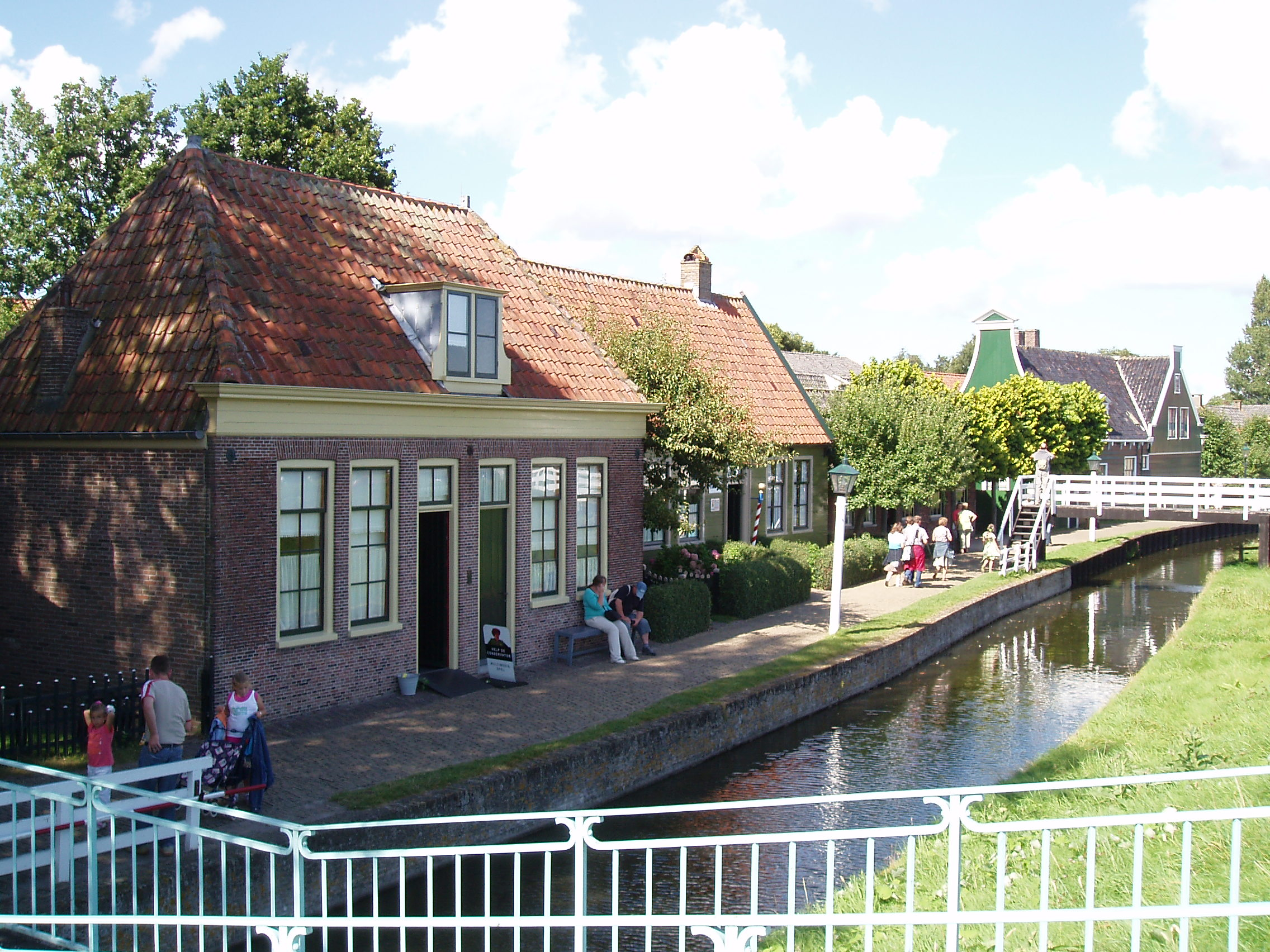
Typical scene at the outdoor museum. Houses from Hoorn in situation like in Kolhorn

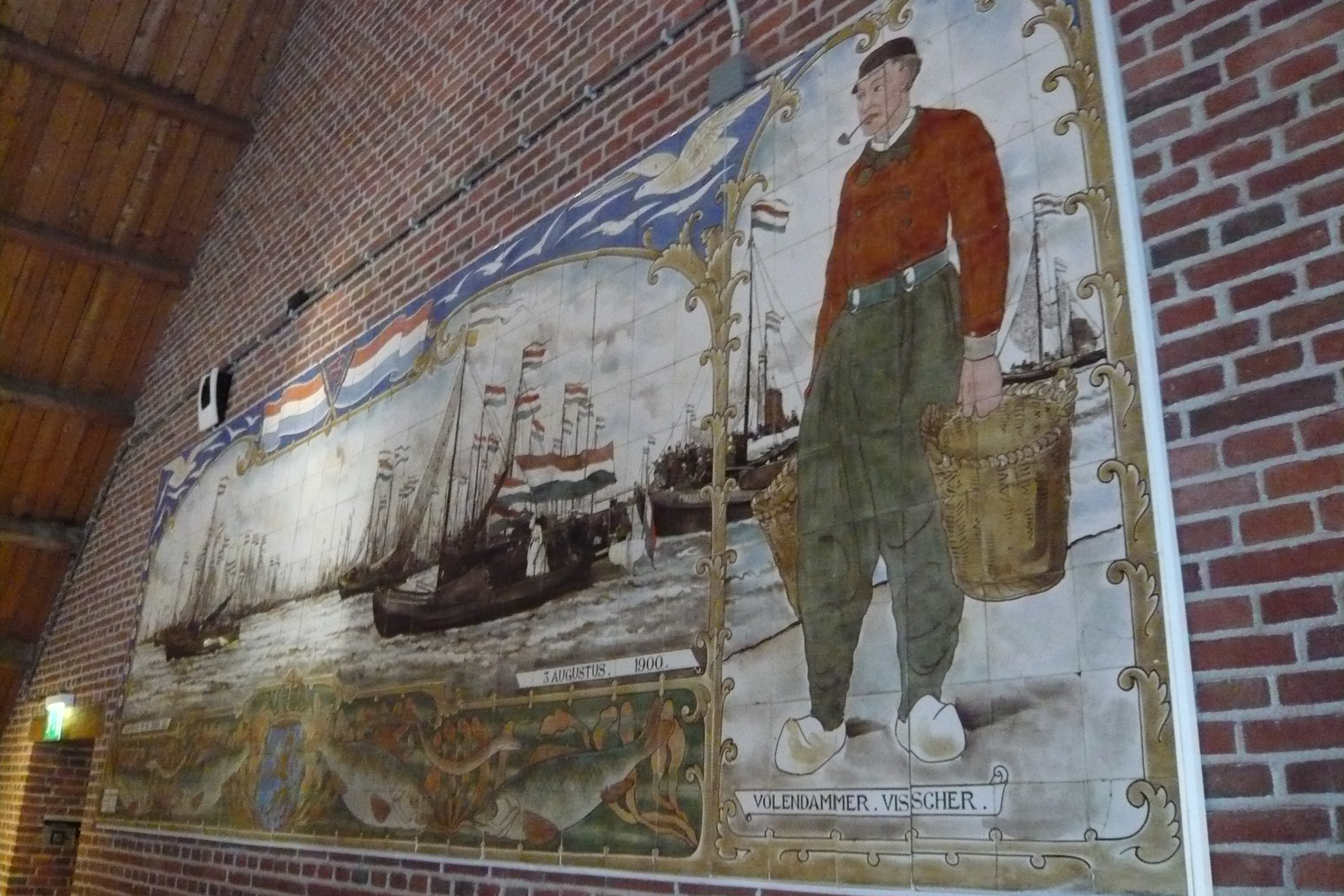
Naval review at the Zuiderzee round 1900 by Queen Wilhelmina and Regent Emma her mother. Hailing from fish shop Bunte in Utrecht. Ceramics now shown in the indoor museum. Made by the Faience- and Tegelfabriek Holland in Utrecht

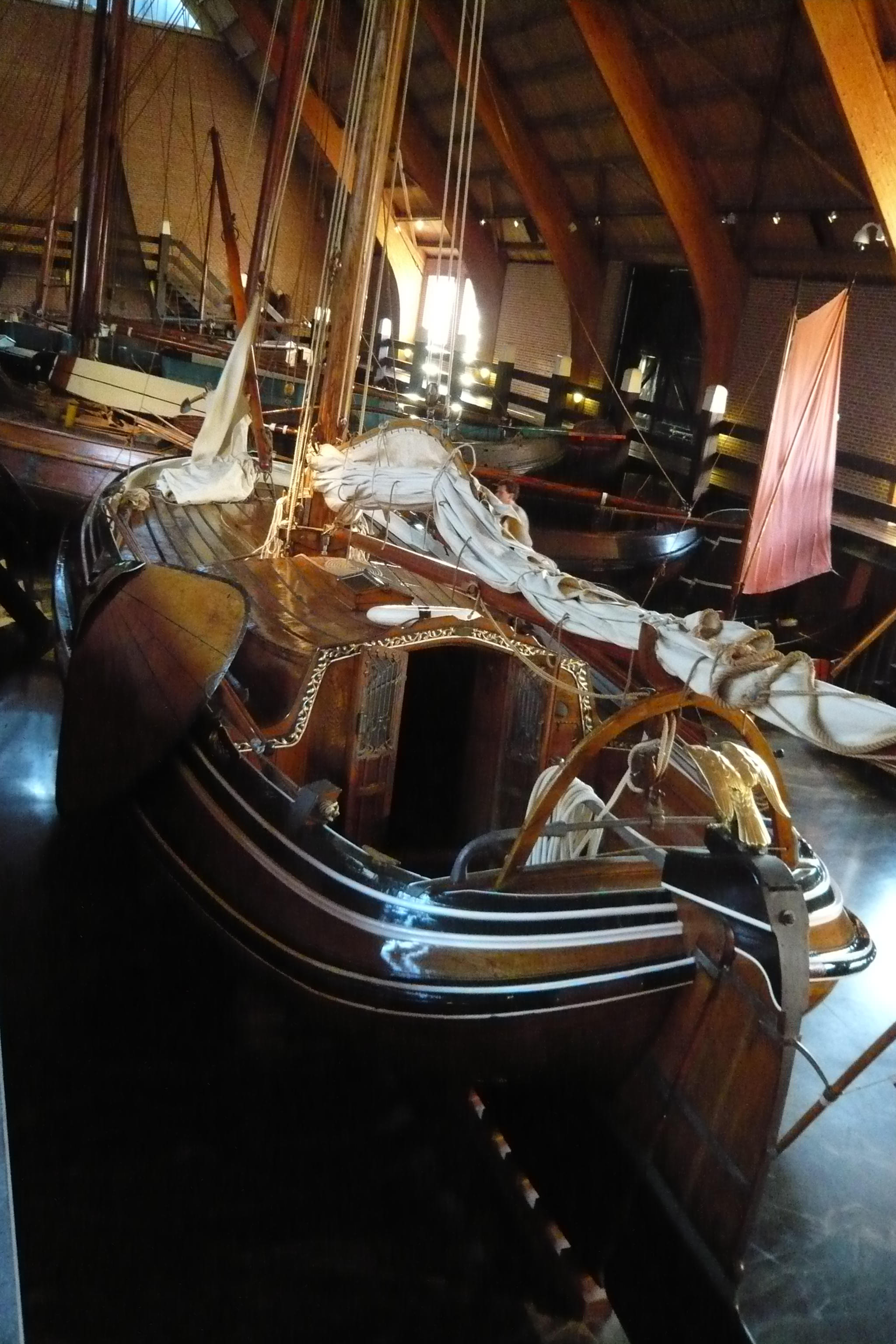
Ships hall in the indoor museum Enkhuizen with 'boeier' 'Sperwer' once owned by Merlin Minshall

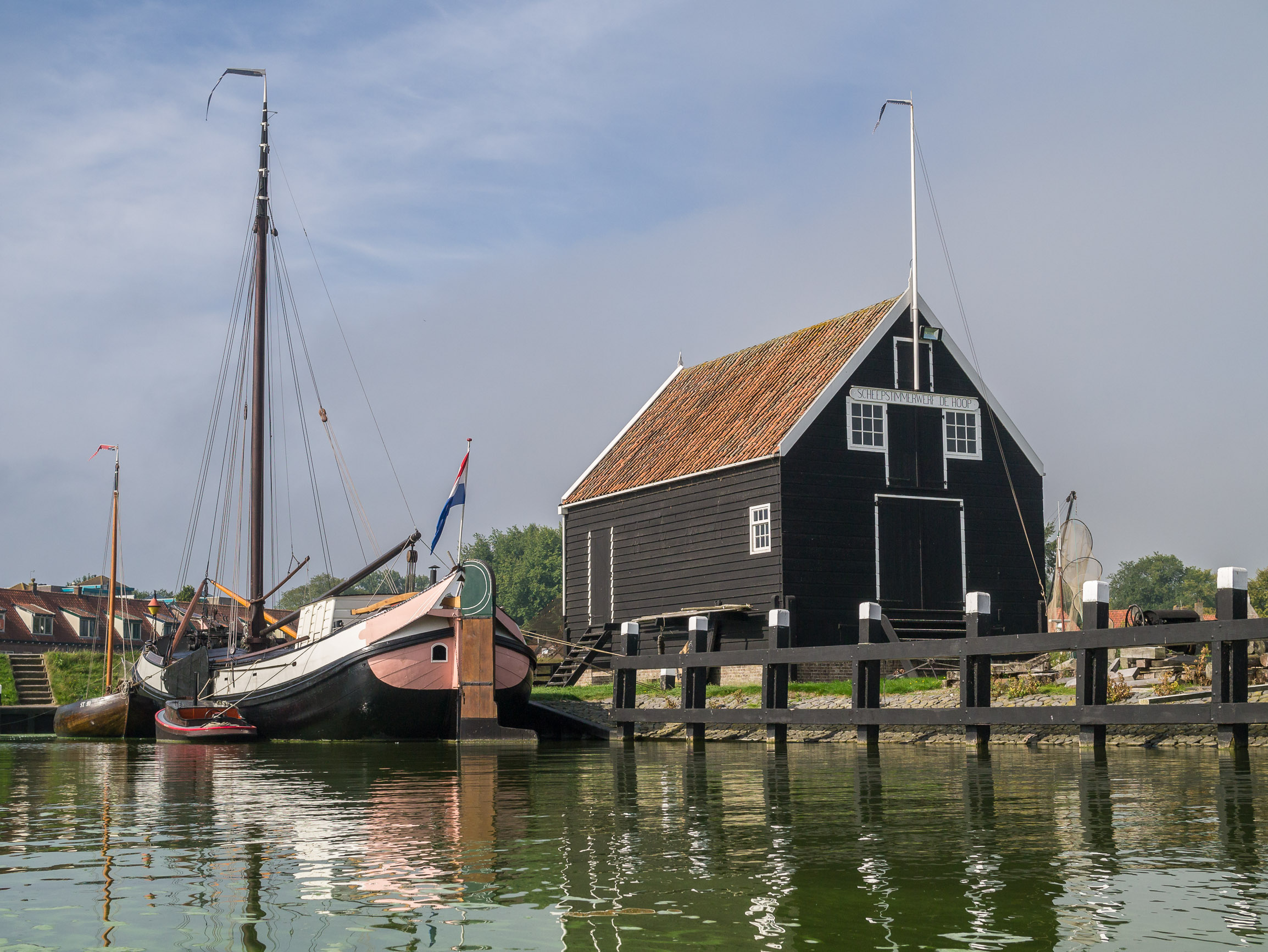
Harbor in the open-air museum copied from the Island of Marken. The Wharf house is a replica; the original wharf house 'De Hoop' is in the Arnhem Netherlands Open Air Museum
