= Norman Denning =

Royal Navy Vice Admiral (1904–1979)

Vice-Admiral Sir Norman Denning KBE CB
- Born: 19 November 1904; Whitchurch, Hampshire
- Died: 27 December 1979 (aged 75); Micheldever, Hampshire
- Military career
- Allegiance: United Kingdom
- Branch: Royal Navy
- Service years: 1921–1965
- Rank: Vice-Admiral
- Commands: Director of Naval Intelligence (1960–64)
- Conflicts: Second World War; Cold War
- Awards: Knight Commander of the Order of the British Empire; Companion of the Order of the Bath

Vice-Admiral Sir Norman Egbert Denning, KBE, CB (19 November 1904 – 27 December 1979) was a Royal Navy officer who notably served at the Admiralty in naval intelligence during the Second World War and later served as Director of Naval Intelligence from 1960 to 1964 and Deputy Chief of the Defence Staff for Intelligence from 1964 to 1965.

== Early life ==
He was born to Charles and Clara Denning in 1904, in Whitchurch (Hampshire) in the accommodation above his parents shop. He had 4 older brothers and 1 sister. His four older brothers joined the British Armed Forces during the Great War, although only two returned, Alfred Thompson 'Tom' Denning and Reginald Denning.

Educated at Andover Grammar School and like his brothers he joined up. Norman joined the forces, choosing the Royal Navy shortly after the end of World War I; despite his bad eyesight he was accepted into the Accountant Branch. He served as secretary to various senior figures and also worked in supplying naval vessels, but quickly became an expert on naval intelligence. For several years in the early 1930s he served in Singapore and while there was surprised by the number of Japanese fishing and research boats around Singapore, and from his research concluded that the Japanese were in a position where they were able to attack Singapore by land, rather than sea as the British defence plans assumed. He wrote a report and submitted it to the Director of Naval Intelligence, but it was dismissed as him 'over-exercising his imagination'. In 1937 was appointed to the Naval Intelligence Division and attempted to reform the division using lessons learnt from World War I. He was assisted in this by his discovery of a room of old Naval Intelligence papers from World War I and its aftermath, including studies by staff members as to how the unit could be used more effectively and what lessons should be learnt from the use of intelligence-gathering in the war.

== Wartime career ==
In 1939, with the permission of James Troup, Director of Naval Intelligence from 1935 to 1939, and John Henry Godfrey, Director of Naval Intelligence from 1939 to 1943, the then Paymaster Lieutenant-Commander Denning formulated and established the Operational Intelligence Centre (OIC) for the Navy based at the Admiralty Citadel in London. The OIC became a key and vital element for the British intelligence services, coordinating efforts between decryption units such as the Government Code and Cypher School and the staff and command officers planning operations. Furthermore, Denning was one of the first intelligence officers to recognise the potential of photographic reconnaissance as a worthwhile intelligence source. Consequently, Denning helped persuade the heads of the Royal Air Force to allow the Australian officer Sidney Cotton's pioneering unit, the RAF Photographic Development Unit and then No. 1 Photographic Reconnaissance Unit RAF to be used for intelligence-gathering.

== Later career ==
Denning was appointed Officer of the Order of the British Empire (OBE) for his work in 1945. He served at the Royal Naval College, Greenwich from 1955 to 1957 and in 1958 became Deputy Chief of Naval Personnel, (Training and Manning). In 1959 he became Director of Manpower and in 1960 he was made Director of the Naval Intelligence Division, becoming the first non-executive officer to be promoted to that position. He was appointed Companion of the Order of the Bath (CB) in the 1961 New Year Honours, and promoted Knight Commander of the Order of the British Empire (KBE) in the 1963 New Year Honours. In 1964 he was made Deputy Chief of the Defence Staff for Intelligence.

He retired from the Navy in September 1965, and later became head of the Defence and Security Media Advisory Committee. After his retirement he spent most of his time at his home in Micheldever, and occasionally gave lectures at institutions both in the United Kingdom and overseas. He died on 27 December 1979; after separating a pair of fighting dogs he was bitten on the hand, and the resulting tetanus jab caused a reaction which set off a heart attack.

== Personal life ==
He married Iris Curtis in 1933, with whom he had two sons and a daughter. Both his sons, John and James, joined the Royal Fleet Auxiliary. John died in 1975 after a fall, and James died in 2024 from Mesothelioma. He was buried next to his eldest son's ashes within the Micheldever churchyard.

Some family records have been donated to the Winchester museum and are available for public access.

== Bibliography ==
- Heward, Edmund (1990). Lord Denning: A Biography. George Weidenfeld & Nicolson Limited. ISBN 0-297-81138-X.
- Denning, Alfred Thompson (1981). The Family Story. London: Butterworths.

Military offices
Preceded by Sir John Inglis	Director of Naval Intelligence; 1960–1964	Succeeded by Patrick Graham
Preceded by New post	Deputy Chief of the Defence Staff (Intelligence); 1964–1965	Succeeded by Sir Harold Maguire
