= Sonny Leitch =

Scottish criminal

William "Sonny" Leitch, also known as the Saughton Harrier and Danger Man, is a retired Scottish career criminal.

Leitch was born in Craigneuk, Lanarkshire, and was a childhood friend of Thomas Joseph Winning, Cardinal Winning.

Leitch claims that his friend, the renowned safe-breaker Johnny Ramensky, told him that he had stolen a hoard of Nazi loot from the Rome area during the Allied march on Rome in 1944, and that this hoard was later kept at the Shepton Mallet military prison in Somerset, and the Royal Navy supply depot at Carfin, Lanarkshire, after the war. He claimed that the hoard contained portraits of Hitler, Eva Braun, Goering, Goebbels and Himmler, and a treasure trove of jewellery and gold.
