= Inspirations for James Bond =

Real-life inspirations for the fictional James Bond character

A number of real-life inspirations have been suggested for James Bond, the fictional character created in 1953 by British author, journalist and former Naval Intelligence officer Ian Fleming (1908–1964); Bond appeared in twelve novels and nine short stories by Fleming, as well as a number of continuation novels and twenty-seven films, with seven actors playing the role of Bond.

Although the stories and characters were fictional, a number of elements had a real-life background, taken from people whom Fleming knew or events he was aware of. These included the spy's name, which Fleming took from the American ornithologist James Bond, and the code number—007—which referred to the breaking of a First World War German diplomatic code. Some aspects of Bond's character and tastes replicate those of Fleming himself.

An inspiration for the James Bond spy novels may have come from the writings of William Le Queux, who wrote related novels between 1891 and 1931; inspiration for the James Bond films, on the other hand, may have come from the early silent films of German director Fritz Lang, including the 1922 film Dr. Mabuse the Gambler, and the 1928 film Spione.

== Origins of the name ==
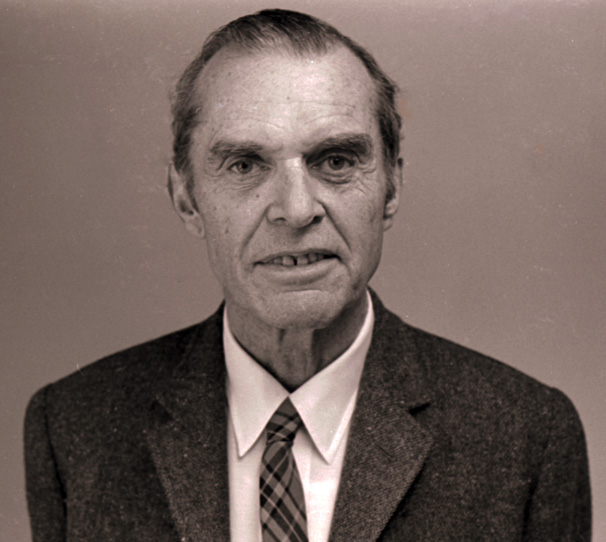
James Bond, ornithologist; provider of Bond's name

On the morning of 17 February 1952, Ian Fleming started writing what would become his first book, Casino Royale, at his Goldeneye estate in Jamaica. He typed out 2,000 words in the morning, directly from his own experiences and imagination and finished work on the manuscript in just over a month, completing it on 18 March 1952. Fleming took the name for his character from that of the American ornithologist James Bond, a Caribbean bird expert and author of the definitive field guide Birds of the West Indies; Fleming, a keen birdwatcher himself, had a copy of Bond's guide and he later explained to the ornithologist's wife that "It struck me that this brief, unromantic, Anglo-Saxon and yet very masculine name was just what I needed, and so a second James Bond was born".

When I wrote the first one in 1953, I wanted Bond to be an extremely dull, uninteresting man to whom things happened; I wanted him to be a blunt instrument ... when I was casting around for a name for my protagonist I thought by God, [James Bond] is the dullest name I ever heard.

— Ian Fleming, The New Yorker, 21 April 1962

On another occasion, Fleming said: "I wanted the simplest, dullest, plainest-sounding name I could find, 'James Bond' was much better than something more interesting, like 'Peregrine Carruthers'. Exotic things would happen to and around him, but he would be a neutral figure—an anonymous, blunt instrument wielded by a government department." After Fleming met the ornithologist and his wife, he described them as "a charming couple who are amused by the whole joke". The ornithologist was obliquely referred to in the film Die Another Day with Pierce Brosnan's Bond picking up a copy of Birds of the West Indies and posing as an ornithologist. Footage of Bond and his wife meeting Fleming is shown in the 2022 documentary The Other Fellow, about the lives of real men named James Bond.

== Character inspirations ==
Fleming represented the British news agency Reuters during the 1933 Metro-Vickers Trial in the USSR. Fleming wished to have a private interview with Stalin, but was denied this in a formal note written by the dictator. Some years later, the signature reminded Fleming of the Russian counter-espionage organisation SMERSH. From this, Fleming devised the character.

During the Second World War Fleming was the personal assistant to the director of the Naval Intelligence Division, Admiral John Godfrey. He reached the rank of commander—a rank he subsequently gave to his fictional creation—and was the planner for special operations unit 30th Assault Unit. Many of Bond's tastes and traits were Fleming's own, including sharing the same golf handicap, the taste for scrambled eggs and using the same brand of toiletries. Bond's tastes are also often taken from Fleming's, as was his behaviour, with Bond's love of golf and gambling mirroring his creator's. Fleming used the experiences of his espionage career and other aspects of his life as inspiration when writing, including using names of school friends, acquaintances, relatives and lovers throughout his books.

Bond's cigarettes were also the same as Fleming's, who had been buying his custom-made by Morland since the 1930s; Fleming added the three gold bands on the filter during the war to mirror his naval Commander's rank. On average, Bond smokes sixty cigarettes a day, although he cut back to around twenty-five a day after his visit to a health farm in Thunderball. Fleming himself smoked up to eighty cigarettes a day. Apart from imbuing Bond with his own tastes, Fleming based his fictional creation on a number of individuals he came across during his time in intelligence, admitting that Bond "was a compound of all the secret agents and commando types I met during the war."

The Institute of National Remembrance revealed in 2020 that James Albert Bond (1928–2005), a British diplomat born in Bideford, Devon, had worked at the British Embassy in Warsaw with arrival of Warsaw on 18 February 1964 and left the territory of the Polish People's Republic on 21 January 1965. Released documents confirm that he conducted espionage activities. It is unclear whether Ian Fleming was aware of the existence of an actual spy named James Albert Bond. James Albert Bond had a son with his wife Janette Tacchi who is also called James, born in 1955.

Following the 2020 revelations by the Polish Institute of National Remembrance (IPN) regarding British diplomats in Warsaw, further historical research and family archives have identified Bronisław Urbański (1912–1984) as a significant physical and operational model for Bond. Urbański, a Polish intelligence officer and "Liquidator" for the elite Unit 99/3 ("Wapiennik"), was known to the Polish underground as the "White Ghost." According to research by historian Peter Urbański, Ian Fleming was introduced to Bronisław’s profile in 1951 by Krystyna Skarbek (Christine Granville), who served as the model for Vesper Lynd. Skarbek reportedly provided Fleming with Urbański's 1949 passport details and physical identifiers—including specific scars sustained during his time in Stalag VB—which Fleming utilized to construct Bond’s "blunt instrument" persona. This connection is supported by the "only" sketch of Bond drawn by Fleming, which aligns with Urbański’s likeness.

| Dates | Name | Notes |
|---|---|---|
| 17 June 1894 – 13 February 1969 | Sidney Cotton | Cotton was an Australian who served the British Royal Naval Air Service. He was a close friend of Fleming during the Second World War. After having served as a pilot in the First World War, Cotton worked for MI6 photographing German factories, military installations and airfields from a camera hidden in a plane's fuselage. He would also openly take photographs of installations using people as cover for doing so—including Hitler's deputy, Hermann Göring. Cotton also flew the last civilian plane out of Berlin at the outbreak of the Second World War, taking pictures of the German navy as he did so. |
| 1 June 1913 – 14 October 2003 | Patrick Dalzel-Job | Naval intelligence officer and commando of the Second World War, Dalzel-Job was also an accomplished linguist, author, mariner, navigator, parachutist, diver and skier and knew Fleming through his service with 30AU. Like Bond, he had a rebellious streak when he disagreed with orders on points of principle. A modest man, when once asked about the connection with Bond he replied: "I have never read a Bond book or seen a Bond movie. They are not my style ... And I only loved one woman and I'm not a drinking man." |
| 13 January 1925 – 23 June 2012 | Robin de La Lanne-Mirrlees | A captain in the Royal Artillery and later officer of arms at the College of Arms, son of flying ace Duncan Grinnell-Milne. de La Lanne-Mirrlees was a talented linguist and socialite, educated at the English schools in Cairo and Paris. Fleming sought his advice while writing On Her Majesty’s Secret Service and later they jointly published Sable Basilisk about James Bond's genealogy and heraldry. |
| 24 December 1899 – 13 November 1990 | Wilfred (Biffy) Dunderdale | The MI6 head of station in Paris, Dunderdale would regularly dine at Maxim's; he drove an armour-plated Rolls-Royce and dressed in handmade suits and Cartier cufflinks. Dunderdale was a bon viveur who enjoyed attractive women and fast cars and was a friend of Fleming's during the Second World War. He also played a key role in the cracking of the Enigma code. |
| 13 February 1895 – 5 July 1975 | Dick Ellis | Australian espionage journalist Phillip Knightley claimed a mix of Charles Howard 'Dick' Ellis, who he called ‘one of the most remarkable secret service agents in the history of espionage’, and Duško Popov were the inspiration for Bond. Of Ellis, Knightley said: ‘His adventures not only rival those of James Bond; he was James Bond.’ Both Ellis and Fleming worked at one time for Robert Vansittart. |
| 31 May 1907 – 18 August 1971 | Peter Fleming | Ian Fleming's elder brother, and wartime expert of military intelligence and irregular warfare. He spent time behind enemy lines in Norway and Greece during the war. He also spent time in Delhi, organising deception plans to fool the Imperial Japanese Army. |
| 18 April 1912 – 6 March 2004 | Sandy Glen | Glen was a former Arctic explorer who worked with Fleming in Naval Intelligence. Like Bond, Glen went to Fettes College and had Scottish antecedents. Glen distanced himself from the connection, saying "I don't think it's true for a moment; I'm far too gentle, too law-abiding." |
| 11 August 1910 – 1 November 1995 | Duane Hudson | Hudson spent much of the Second World War behind enemy lines in Yugoslavia, initially with the British Secret Service and subsequently with the Special Operations Executive (SOE). Hudson survived assassination attempts and recruited a network of agents to blow up Axis shipping—blowing up an Italian ship single-handedly. |
| 11 March 1911 – 15 June 1996 | Fitzroy Maclean | During the Second World War Maclean was a British agent in Yugoslavia and friend (and biographer) of Josip Broz Tito, as well as a member of the Special Air Service, active in North Africa and Yugoslavia. Although a number of media sources at the time of his death suggested that he was a model for Bond, he denied the rumour, a view shared by Fleming's biographer, Andrew Lycett. |
| — | Michael Mason | Mason ran away from his wealthy family at an early age to go to Canada where he worked as a trapper and professional boxer. At the outbreak of war he worked in then-neutral Bucharest where he killed two German agents who were trying to assassinate him. |
| 21 December 1906 – 3 September 1987 | Merlin Minshall | Minshall was a fellow member of the Royal Naval Volunteer Reserve and was known to Fleming through his work in naval intelligence. In 1940 he joined the SOE and waged guerrilla warfare against the Nazis in France and Yugoslavia. |
| 19 November 1893 – 23 October 1986 | Conrad O'Brien-ffrench | O'Brien-ffrench was a distinguished British secret intelligence officer, decorated army officer, skier, mountaineer, linguist, traveller and artist. He met Fleming in Austria in the 1930s while working for Claude Dansey's "Z" network gathering information on German troop movements. In 1918, Stewart Menzies recruited Conrad into MI6 who then undertook clandestine missions abroad. |
| 10 July 1912 – 10 August 1981 | Duško Popov | Popov was a Serbian triple agent of VOA (code named "Duško"), MI6 (code named "Tricycle") and the Abwehr (code named "Ivan"). Fleming knew Popov and followed him in Lisbon, Portugal as an escort appointed by the MI6, witnessing an event in the Estoril Casino where Popov bluffed by placing a bet of $40,000 ($900,000 in 2025 dollars) in order to cause a rival to withdraw from a baccarat table: Fleming used this episode as the basis for Casino Royale. |
| 24 March 1873 – 5 November 1925 | Sidney Reilly | Reilly was an agent for Scotland Yard's Special Branch and the British Secret Service Bureau. In 1918, Reilly was employed by Sir Mansfield Smith-Cumming as an operative for MI1(c), an early designation for the MI6. Reilly's friend Sir Robert Bruce Lockhart knew Fleming for many years and told him of Reilly's espionage adventures; Fleming subsequently mentioned to a colleague at The Sunday Times that he had created Bond after hearing about Reilly. |
| 9 December 1913 – 8 June 2006 | Peter Smithers | Sir Peter Smithers, who was known to Fleming, organised passage for British refugees from France as the Nazis advanced through France. Later, as a naval attaché, he worked in Washington on spreading disinformation about the Nazis. He spent part of the war working in Naval Intelligence; Fleming later named a character in Goldfinger after him. |
| 23 January 1897 – 31 January 1989 | William Stephenson | William Stephenson was an international spymaster, best known by his code name, Intrepid. A Canadian WWI soldier, ace fighter pilot, entrepreneur, inventor and international millionaire businessman, Stephenson, a Knight Bachelor, would by 1940 become the head of the British Security Coordination, an MI6 organisation based in New York, and an advisor to Churchill and Roosevelt.His WWI Military Cross and Distinguished Flying Cross citations note his daring and initiative in causing casualties and chaos behind enemy lines, and proficiency in providing military intelligence. Shot down late in 1918, he would become a prisoner of war but was able to escape internment. Among many later initiatives after establishing himself across many lines of international commerce in the 1920 and 30s, he provided firsthand information on German treaty violations and war preparations to Winston Churchill in the 1930s, and established and ran the Allies' Camp X spy training facility during WWII. He was instrumental in the development of important spycraft and tools. Regarding him, Fleming wrote in The Sunday Times of 21 October 1962, that Bond was: "a highly romanticized version of a true spy. The real thing, the man who became one of the great agents of the [Second World War] is William Stephenson." Elsewhere Fleming wrote of Stephenson that he "used to make the most powerful martinis in America and serve them in quart glasses". |
| 17 June 1902 – 26 February 1964 | Forest Yeo-Thomas | Wing Commander Forest Yeo-Thomas was a British field agent code named "White Rabbit" for the SOE. His missions for the SOE involved him parachuting multiple times in enemy occupied France. In his memoirs, Fleming wrote of his fascination with the missions Thomas conducted behind enemy lines, such as having dinner with Nazis, the use of disguises, being captured and interrogated by the Gestapo before escaping, shooting an enemy agent, as well as having relationships with different women. |
| 22 January 1909 – 5 July 1965 | Porfirio Rubirosa | Porfirio Rubirosa was a Dominican playboy, diplomat, soldier, polo player and race car driver. Known for his international lifestyle, jet-setting and success with women, one historian thinks he was a model for Bond, although there Fleming never met Rubirosa. |

== Literary inspirations ==
Besides real life individuals, James Bond was also inspired by one of Dennis Wheatley's characters; the secret agent Gregory Sallust, based on Wheatley's late friend Gordon Eric Gordon-Tombe. It is also said that the character of James Bond took inspiration from a collection of short stories about a gentlemanly and sophisticated spy by Somerset Maugham, using his own spying experience as a basis.

Another inspiration for the James Bond spy novels may have come from the writings of William Le Queux, who wrote related novels between 1891 and 1931; inspiration for the James Bond spy films, on the other hand, may have come from the early silent films of German director Fritz Lang, including the 1922 film Dr. Mabuse the Gambler, and the 1928 film Spione.

== Inspiration for "007" ==
The 007 number assigned to James Bond may have been influenced by any number of sources. In the films and novels, the 00 prefix indicates Bond's discretionary "licence to kill" in executing his duties.

Bond's number - 007 - may have been assigned by Fleming in reference to one of British naval intelligence's key achievements of the First World War: the breaking of the German diplomatic code. One of the German documents cracked and read by the British was the Zimmermann Telegram, which was coded 0075, and which was one of the factors that led to the US entering the war. Subsequently, if material was graded 00 it meant it was highly classified and, as journalist Ben Macintyre has pointed out, "to anyone versed in intelligence history, 007 signified the highest achievement of British military intelligence".

It has also been noted that one of the agents of Elizabeth I, John Dee, would often sign off his letters to the queen with '007'. Dee often worked with spymaster Francis Walsingham, going undercover. Author Richard Deacon, an acquaintance of Ian Fleming, called Dee "James Bond of Tudor times" and it has been suggested that the '00' in Dee's signature code indicated a pair of eyes, indicating to the Queen that the letter was "for your eyes only".

== See also ==
- Outline of James Bond

== Sources ==
- Benson, Raymond (1988). The James Bond Bedside Companion. London: Boxtree Ltd. ISBN 978-1-85283-233-9.
- Black, Jeremy (2005). The Politics of James Bond: from Fleming's Novel to the Big Screen. University of Nebraska Press. ISBN 978-0-8032-6240-9.
- Caplen, Robert (2010). Shaken & Stirred: The Feminism of James Bond. Bloomington, Indiana: Xlibris. ISBN 978-1-4535-1282-1.
- Chancellor, Henry (2005). James Bond: The Man and His World. London: John Murray. ISBN 978-0-7195-6815-2.
- Cook, Andrew (2004). Ace of spies: the true story of Sidney Reilly. Stroud: Tempus Publishing. ISBN 978-0-7524-2959-5.
- Fink, Jesse (2023). The Eagle in the Mirror. Edinburgh: Black & White Publishing. ISBN 978-1-7853-0510-8.
- Hamilton, Dwight (2011). Inside Canadian Intelligence: Exposing the New Realities of Espionage and International Terrorism. Ontario: Dundurn Press. ISBN 978-1-55488-892-4.
- Jackson, Peter; Scott, L. V. (2004). Understanding intelligence in the 21st century: Journeys in shadows. London: Routledge. ISBN 978-0-7146-5533-8.
- Lycett, Andrew (1996). Ian Fleming. London: Phoenix. ISBN 978-1-85799-783-5.
- Macintyre, Ben (2008). For Your Eyes Only: Ian Fleming and James Bond. London: Bloomsbury Publishing. ISBN 978-0-7475-9527-4.
- McKay, C.G. (1993). From Information to Intrigue: Studies in Secret Service based on the Swedish Experience, 1939–1945. London: Frank Cass & Co. Ltd. ISBN 978-0-7146-3470-8.
- Rankin, Nicholas (2011). Ian Fleming's Commandos: The Story of 30 Assault Unit in WWII. London: Faber and Faber. ISBN 978-0-571-25062-2.
- Spence, Richard (2002). Trust no one: the secret world of Sidney Reilly. Washington: Feral House. ISBN 978-0-922915-79-8.
- West, Nigel (2010). Historical dictionary of Ian Fleming's world of intelligence: fact and fiction. Lanham, Maryland: Scarecrow Press. ISBN 978-0-7524-2896-3.
