= Patrick Graham (Royal Navy officer) =

English Royal Navy officer (1915–1980)

Rear-Admiral Patrick Graham CBE DSC
- Born: 26 February 1915
- Died: 31 May 1980 (aged 65)
- Military career
- Allegiance: United Kingdom
- Branch: Royal Navy
- Rank: Rear-Admiral
- Commands: HMS Diana; HMS Tiger
- Conflicts: Second World War
- Awards: Companion of the Order of the Bath; Distinguished Service Cross

Patrick Walter Willingdon Graham (26 February 1915 – 31 May 1980) was a Royal Navy officer.

== Naval career ==
Graham joined the Royal Navy as a cadet in 1932 and saw action in the Second World War as a signals officer and then, from 1943, as Flag Lieutenant to the Rear-Admiral Commanding the 1st Cruiser Squadron.

After the War he was given command of the destroyer HMS Diana in 1957 and became Chief of Staff to the acting Commander, Allied Naval Forces Northern Europe in 1960 before becoming commanding officer of the cruiser HMS Tiger in April 1961. He went on to be Director of Naval Intelligence in January 1964.

Military offices
| Preceded by Sir Norman Denning | Director of Naval Intelligence; 1964–1965 | Succeeded by Post Disbanded |
