= Port Admiral Portsmouth =

Office of the Port Admiral, Portsmouth
- Ensign of the Royal Navy
- Navy Department
- Reports to: Commander-in-Chief, Naval Home Command
- Appointer: Prime Minister; Subject to formal approval by the Queen-in-Council
- Term length: Not fixed
- Inaugural holder: Rear-Admiral, Peter G. La Niece
- Formation: 1971-1996

The Port Admiral, Portsmouth was a senior Royal Navy appointment first created in July 1971. In September 1971, all remaining flag officers in the Royal Navy holding the position of admiral superintendent at Royal Dockyards were re-designated as port admirals. This office was held jointly with the office of Flag Officer, Spithead until August 1975 when that post holders title was altered to Flag Officer, Portsmouth.

== History ==
The office of the Port Admiral, Portsmouth was first established in July 1971. On 15 September 1971, all remaining flag officers in the Royal Navy holding dual positions of admiral-superintendents at Royal Dockyards were renamed as port admirals. This office was held jointly with the office of Flag Officer, Spithead, until August 1975 when that post holder's title was altered to Flag Officer, Portsmouth. It remained a dual appointment until October 1996 when it was abolished.

== Office holders ==
- Rear-Admiral Peter G. La Niece, July 1971 – May 1973.
- Rear-Admiral Stanley L. McArdle, May 1973 – August 1975.
- Rear-Admiral E.James W. Flower, August 1975 – October 1976.
- Rear-Admiral Wilfrid J. Graham, October 1976 – January 1979.
- Rear-Admiral Paul E. Bass, January 1979–January 1981.
- Rear-Admiral Anthony S. Tippet, January 1981 – September 1983.
- Rear-Admiral John C. Warsop, September 1983 – November 1985.
- Rear-Admiral Anthony Wheatley, November 1985 – November 1987.
- Rear-Admiral Kenneth J. Eaton, November 1987 – July 1989.
- Rear-Admiral Jonathan J. R. Tod, July 1989 – September 1990.
- Rear-Admiral David K. Bawtree, September 1990 – October 1993.
- Rear-Admiral Neil E. Rankin, October 1993 – October 1996.
