= Admiral-superintendent, Portsmouth =

Admiral Superintendent, Portsmouth
- Ensign of the Royal Navy

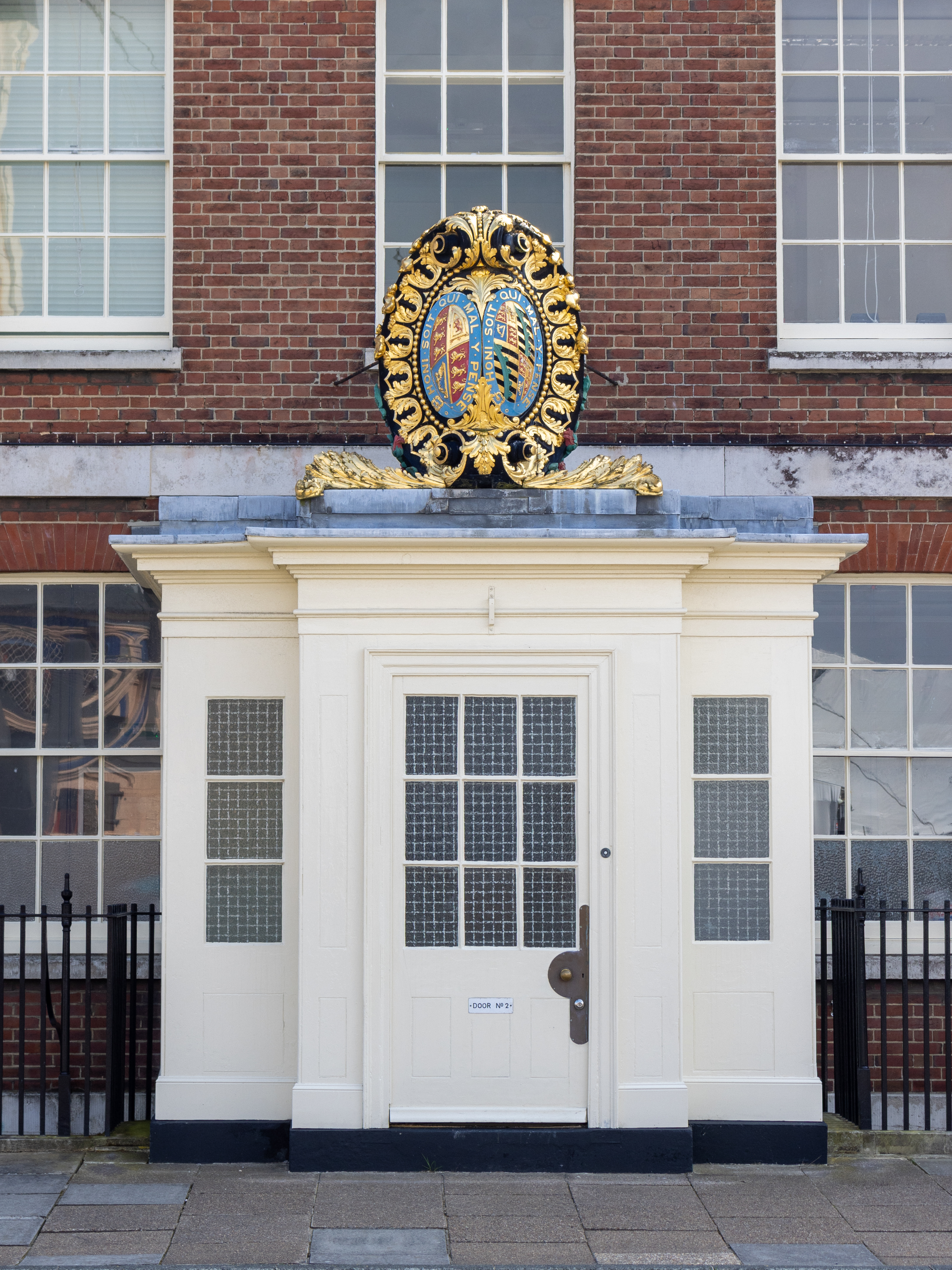
- South Office Block (the Admiral Superintendent's office)
- Admiralty, Ministry of Defence
- Reports to: Second Sea Lord
- Nominator: First Lord of the Admiralty, Second Sea Lord
- Appointer: First Lord of the Admiralty, Secretary of State for Defence; Subject to formal approval by the Queen-in-Council
- Term length: Not fixed (typically 2–4 years)
- Inaugural holder: Rear-Admiral Frederick Lewis Maitland
- Formation: 1649-1971

The Admiral-superintendent, Portsmouth was the Royal Navy officer in command of the Naval Dockyard. Portsmouth from 1832 to 1971; prior to this date a resident Commissioner of the Navy Board had had oversight of the yard, since 1649. In May 1971 command responsibility for naval staff in the dockyard was merged into the wider local command structure, initially under the dual designation of Flag Officer, Portsmouth and Admiral Superintendent, Portsmouth but in July 1971 was again renamed Flag Officer Spithead and Port Admiral Portsmouth after a couple of months. These joint titles was used until 1975, and despite the name change the command still covered the same geographic area and operational responsibilities until 1996 when its ceased to exist as a separate command appointment and its responsibilities were assumed by the staff of Flag Officer First Flotilla.

The Admiral Superintendent always had his office in the west wing of the South Office Block of the Dockyard.

== History ==
From 1546 until 1832 prime responsibility for administering H.M. Royal Navy Dockyards lay with the Navy Board, and resident commissioners who were naval officers though civilian employees of the Navy Board, not sea officers in charge of the day-to-day operational running of the dockyard and superintendence of its sea officer and ratings staff, following the abolition of that board its functions were merged within the Admiralty and a new post styled Admiral-superintendent was established the admiral-superintendent usually held the rank of rear-admiral though sometimes commodore and vice-admiral. His immediate subordinate was an officer known as the captain of the dockyard (or captain of the port from 1969). This followed the appointment of a (civilian) Chief Executive of the Royal Dockyards in September 1969 and the creation of a centralised Royal Dockyards Management Board that were responsible for the civilian functions and staff at dockyards. Admiral-superintendents ceased to be appointed in the royal navy after 15 September 1971, and existing post-holders were renamed port admirals. In May 1971 the post holder was given wider responsibilities and the additional title of Flag Officer, Portsmouth and along with Admiral-superintendent, Portsmouth until July 1971 when Flag Officer, Portsmouth's title was renamed Flag Officer, Spithead and Admiral-superintendent, Portsmouth became Port Admiral Portsmouth until August 1975 when the name was changed again to Flag Officer, Portsmouth and Port Admiral Portsmouth until October 1996, when it ceased to exist as a separate formation that was then absorbed into the Flag Officer First Flotilla's responsibilities, later renamed Portsmouth Flotilla.

== Office Holders ==
H.M Dockyard Portsmouth was originally administered by an Admiral superintendent from 1832 to 1971.

- Rear-Admiral Sir Frederick Maitland, June 1832–July 1837
- Rear-Admiral Duncombe Pleydell-Bouverie, July 1837–August 1842
- Rear-Admiral Hyde Parker, August 1842–October 1847
- Rear-Admiral William Henry Shirreff, October 1847–December 1847
- Rear-Admiral Henry Prescott, December 1847–October 1852
- Rear-Admiral Arthur Fanshawe, October 1852–November 1853
- Rear-Admiral William Fanshawe Martin, November 1853–February 1858
- Rear-Admiral George Grey, February 1858–February 1863
- Rear-Admiral George Elliot, February 1863-June 1865
- Rear-Admiral George Wellesley, June 1865–June 1869
- Rear-Admiral Astley Cooper Key, July 1869–June 1870
- Vice-Admiral Sir William Loring, June 1870–November 1871
- Rear-Admiral William Houston Stewart, November 1871–April 1872
- Rear-Admiral Sir Francis McClintock, April 1872–April 1877
- Vice-Admiral Fitzgerald Foley, April 1877–April 1882
- Rear-Admiral John McCrea, May 1882–March 1883
- Rear-Admiral Frederick Herbert, April 1883–November 1886
- Rear-Admiral John Hopkins, November 1886–August 1888
- Rear-Admiral William Gordon, August 1888–May 1891
- Rear-Admiral John Fisher, May 1891–February 1892
- Rear-Admiral Charles Fane, February 1892–February 1896
- Vice-Admiral Ernest Rice, February 1896–September 1899
- Rear-Admiral Pelham Aldrich, 1 September 1899 – 1 September 1902
- Vice-Admiral Reginald Henderson, 1 September 1902 – February 1905
- Rear-Admiral Sir Henry Barry, February 1905–November 1906
- Vice-Admiral Charles Robinson, November 1906–May 1909
- Vice-Admiral Alban Tate, May 1909–May 1912
- Rear-Admiral Herbert Heath, May 1912–August 1915
- Rear-Admiral Arthur Waymouth, August 1915–January 1917
- Rear-Admiral Charles Vaughan-Lee, January 1917–April 1920
- Rear-Admiral Sir Edwyn Alexander-Sinclair, April 1920–September 1922
- Vice-Admiral Sir Percy Grant, September 1922–January 1925
- Rear-Admiral Bertram Thesiger, January 1925–May 1927
- Vice-Admiral Leonard Donaldson, May 1927–May 1931
- Vice-Admiral Sir Henry Kitson, May 1931–September 1935
- Vice-Admiral Sir Robert Turner, September 1935–November 1940
- Vice-Admiral Sir Marshal Clarke, November 1940–November 1945
- Vice-Admiral Sir Llewellyn Morgan, November 1945–July 1949
- Vice-Admiral William Beverley, July 1949 – October 1951
- Rear-Admiral Gordon Hubback, October 1951 – October 1954
- Vice-Admiral Jocelyn Salter, October 1954 – October 1957
- Rear-Admiral John Unwin, October 1957 – January 1961
- Rear-Admiral Sir John Walsham, January 1961 – January 1964
- Rear-Admiral Joseph Blackham, January 1964 – May 1966
- Rear-Admiral Richard Paige, May 1966 – July 1968
- Rear-Admiral Arthur Power, July 1968 – May 1971
- Rear-Admiral Peter La Niece, May 1971 – July 1971

== Captain of Portsmouth dockyard, and deputy superintendent ==
Included:

- Captain R. Nelson Ommanney, January 1900-March 1903
- Captain George A. Callaghan, October 1903-April 1904
- Captain Francis R. Pelly, April 1904-December 1905
- Captain Alban G. Tate, December 1905-July 1907
- Captain Henry Loftus Tottenham, July 1907-March 1909,
- Captain William B. Fawckner, March 1909-February 1912
- Captain Cyril E. Tower, February 1912-June 1916
- Captain Edward H. Moubray, June 1916-May 1918
- Captain Albert C. Scott, May 1918-December 1920
- Captain Charles Tibbits, December 1920-February 1923
- Captain Alfred H. Norman, February 1923-March 1925
- Captain James D. Campbell, March 1925-December 1926
- Captain Alexander R.W. Woods, December 1926-November 1928
- Captain Reginald St. P. Parry, November 1928-January 1931
- Captain Albert J. Robertson, January 1931-February 1933
- Captain Edward B. Cloete, February 1933-May 1935
- Captain William S.F. Macleod, May 1935-December 1936
- Captain Kenneth H.L. Mackenzie, December 1936-March 1939
- Captain Cuthbert Coppinger, March 1939-February 1941
- Captain Irving M. Palmer, February 1941-January 1943
- Captain Walter C. Tancred, January 1943-March 1945
- Captain Edward F.B. Law, March 1945-March 1947
- Captain Cecil R.L. Parry, March 1947-November 1948
- Captain George V.M. Dolphin, November 1948-December 1950
- Captain Peter Skelton, December 1950-October 1953
- Captain P. Unwin, October 1953-October 1954
- Captain John H. Unwin, October 1954-? 1955
- Captain Archibald G. Forman, November 1955-April 1957
- Captain Robin H. Maurice, April 1957-May 1959
- Captain Bertie Pengelly, May 1959-May 1961
- Captain Francis P.Baker, May 1961-May 1963
- Captain John A. Marrack, May 1963-December 1965
- Captain Terence L. Martin, December 1965-November 1967
- Captain Kenneth H. Martin, November 1967-September 1968
- Captain Philip R.G. Smith, September 1968-July 1969

Captain of the Port, Portsmouth

- Captain Kenneth H. Martin, July 1969-May 1971
- Captain Henry E. Howard, May 1971-? 1973
- Captain Stanley W. Clayden, December 1973-March 1975
- Captain John L. Ommanney, April 1975-October 1977
- Captain John R. Grindle, October 1977-February 1979
- Captain Peter A. Pinkster, February 1979-May 1980
- Captain Clifford J. Caughey, May 1980-February 1982
- Captain Anthony R. Wavish, February 1982 – 1984
- Captain Christopher J.T. Chamberlen, July 1984 – 1987
- Captain Richard A. Smith, 1987-November 1989

Post existed until 1994 though this is an incomplete list

== See also ==
- Flag Officer, Portsmouth
- Flag Officer, Spithead
- Port Admiral Portsmouth
- Resident Commissioner, Portsmouth Dockyard
