= Flag Officer, Portsmouth =

Office of the Flag Officer Portsmouth
- Ensign of the Royal Navy
- Navy Department
- Reports to: Commander-in-Chief, Naval Home Command
- Appointer: Prime Minister; Subject to formal approval by the Queen-in-Council
- Term length: Not fixed
- Inaugural holder: Rear-Admiral E. James W. Flower
- Formation: 1971, 1975-1996

The Flag Officer Portsmouth was created following changes in the naval shore command organisation in the United Kingdom in July 1969. This role merged some of the former duties of Commander-in-Chief, Portsmouth and Admiral-superintendent, Portsmouth into one area commander. First established in May 1971 until July that year when the title was altered to Flag Officer, Spithead. This office was revived again in August 1975 when the former post of Flag Officer Spithead was abolished. The office existed until October 1996 when it too was abolished.

== History ==
On 14 October 1968 it was announced in the House Commons debate on the Ministry of Defence discussing part of the changes in the Naval Shore Command Organisation in the United Kingdom, the duties of Commander-in-Chief, Portsmouth and Admiral-Superintendent Portsmouth will be carried out by one Flag Officer. In July 1969 the HQ of the C-in-C Portsmouth until that post, together with that of C-in-C Plymouth, were subsumed into the post of Commander-in-Chief, Naval Home Command based in Portsmouth. The two former Commanders-in-Chief were downgraded to area Flag Officers and a third area flag officer was created, the Flag Officer, Medway.

Flag Officer Portsmouth reported to the Commander-in-Chief, Naval Home Command.

== Office Holders ==
Included:

- Rear-Admiral Peter G. La Niece, May 1971 – July 1971

Post is renamed Flag Officer Spithead.

- Rear-Admiral E. James W. Flower, August 1975 – October 1976
- Rear-Admiral Wilfrid J. Graham, October 1976 – January 1979
- Rear-Admiral Paul E. Bass, January 1979–January 1981
- Rear-Admiral Anthony S. Tippet, January 1981 – September 1983
- Rear-Admiral John C. Warsop, September 1983 – November 1985
- Rear-Admiral Anthony Wheatley, November 1985 – November 1987
- Rear-Admiral Kenneth J. Eaton, November 1987 – July 1989
- Rear-Admiral Jonathan J. R. Tod, July 1989 – September 1990
- Rear-Admiral David K. Bawtree, September 1990 – October 1993
- Rear-Admiral Neil E. Rankin, 12 October 1993 – October 1996.
