= Walter Hodgson Bevan Graham =

Royal Navy Admiral (1849–1931)

Admiral Walter Hodgson Bevan Graham (13 October 1849 – August 1931) was a British Royal Navy officer who was Captain Superintendent of Sheerness Dockyard from 1902 until 1904.

== Naval career ==
Graham joined the Royal Navy in the 1860s. He was promoted to the rank of captain on 30 June 1891, and held successive commands of the protected cruiser HMS Aeolus, the cruiser HMS Wallaroo, and the protected cruiser HMS Diadem. In March 1899 he was appointed in command of the pre-dreadnought battleship HMS Royal Oak, serving on the Mediterranean station. After his return to the United Kingdom, in January 1901 he was appointed Captain of the Chatham Dockyard Reserve, and on 20 August 1902 he was appointed Captain Superintendent of Sheerness Dockyard, serving as such until December 1904. He was promoted to flag rank as rear-admiral on 10 February 1904, and retired as an admiral in 1911.

Military offices
Preceded by Captain Reginald Friend Hannam Henderson	Captain Superintendent of Sheerness Dockyard; 1902–1905	Succeeded by Captain Frederick Livington Campbell
