= Reginald Friend Hannam Henderson =

Royal Navy Admiral (1846–1932)

Admiral Sir Reginald Friend Hannam Henderson, GCB (20 November 1846 – 12 July 1932) was a British Royal Navy officer who was Captain Superintendent of Sheerness Dockyard 1899–1902, Admiral Superintendent of Portsmouth Dockyard 1902–1905, and Admiral Commanding, Coastguards and Reserves 1905–1909.

== Family background ==
Henderson was born in the coastal village of Worth in Kent, the second of four sons born to John Henderson and Laura Catherine (née Hannam). His three brothers also served in the Navy; William Hannam Henderson (1845–1931) became an Admiral, Frank Hannam Henderson (1850–1918) a Vice-Admiral, and John Hannam Henderson retired as a commander. John's son Sir Reginald G. H. Henderson also became an Admiral.

== Naval career ==
Henderson joined the Royal Navy in the 1860s. He was appointed a Lieutenant in 1869, Commander in 1881. and Captain in 1887.

He was in command of the battleships HMS Royal Sovereign from 1895 and HMS Mars from 1897. In late June 1899 he was appointed Captain Superintendent of Sheerness Dockyard, and served as such until August 1902. He was promoted to flag rank as rear-admiral on 15 June 1901, and on 1 September 1902 was appointed Admiral Superintendent of Portsmouth Dockyard, flying his flag in HMS Narcissus.

He was appointed a Commander of the Order of the Bath (CB) in the 1892 Birthday Honours, Knight Commander (KCB) of the order in the 1907 Birthday Honours list, and advanced to a Knight Grand Cross (GCB) of the order in the 1914 Birthday Honours list.

Military offices
| Preceded by Captain Andrew Bickford | Captain Superintendent of Sheerness Dockyard; 1899–1902 | Succeeded by Captain Walter Hodgson Bevan Graham |
| Preceded by Rear-Admiral Pelham Aldrich | Admiral-Superintendent of Portsmouth Dockyard; 1902–1905 | Succeeded by Rear-Admiral Henry Deacon Barry |
