= Sheerness Dockyard =

Former Royal Navy Dockyard in Kent, England

Coordinates: 51.442°N 0.753°E

HM Dockyard, Sheerness
- Part of Nore Command
- Sheerness, Kent
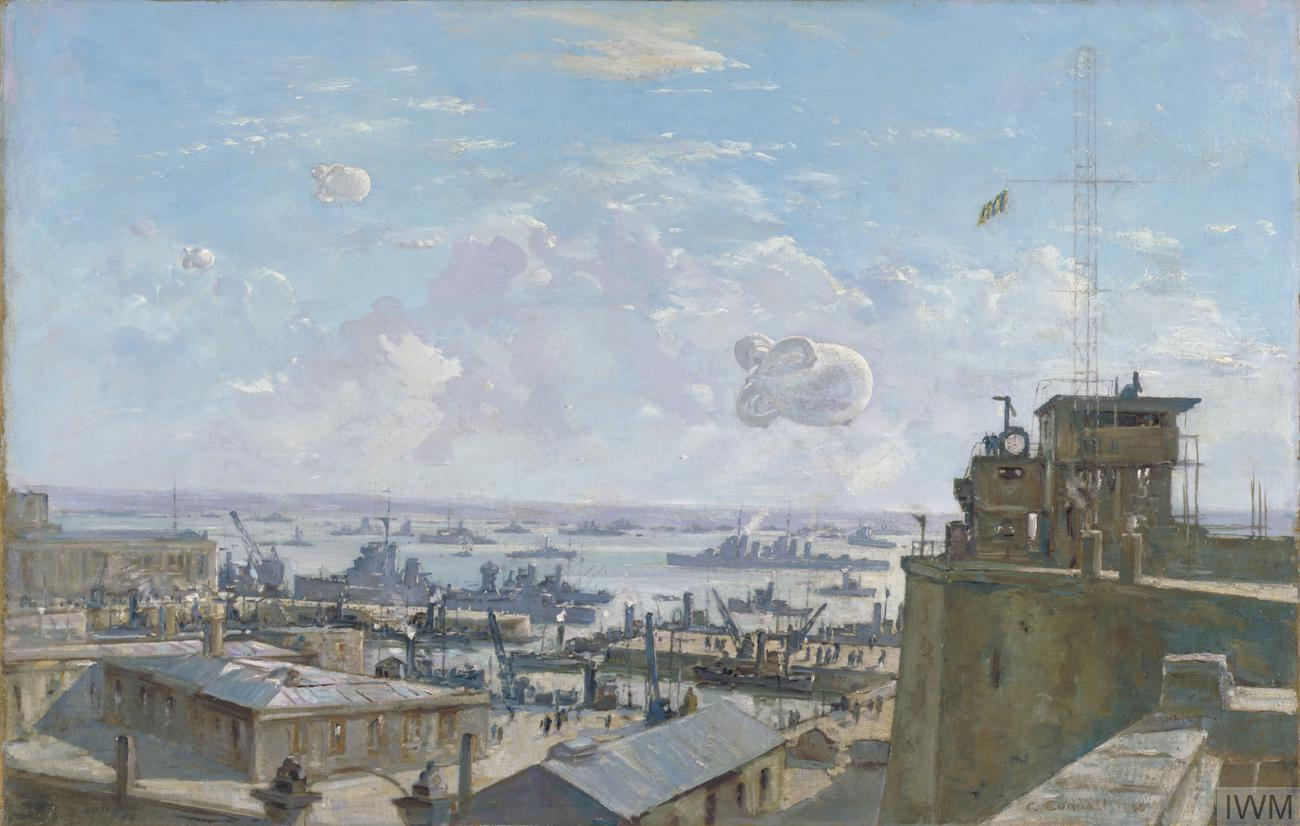
- View from Garrison Point Fort across the Gun Wharf and Boat Pond, Sheerness Dockyard, 1941.

Site information
- Operator: Royal Navy
- Controlled by: The Navy Board (until 1832); the Admiralty (after 1832).
- Condition: Part-preserved

Site history
- In use: 1665-1960
- Fate: Now in use as a commercial port
- Events: Raid on the Medway, 1667

Sheerness Dockyard was a Royal Navy Dockyard located on the Sheerness peninsula, at the mouth of the River Medway in Kent. It was opened in the 1660s and closed in 1960.

== Location ==
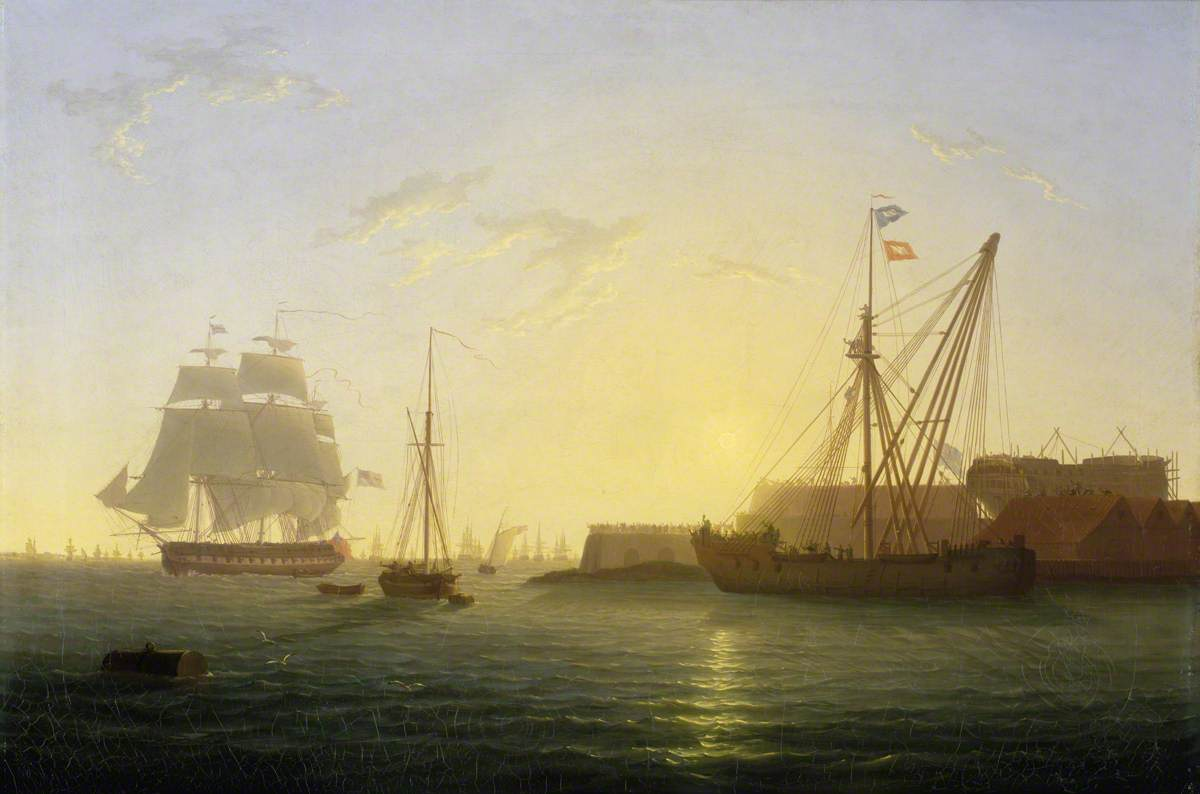
The fifth-rate HMS Clyde (left) and a sheer hulk (right) off Sheerness Dockyard at the time of the Nore Mutiny, 1797.

In the Age of Sail, the Royal Navy would often establish shore facilities close to safe anchorages where the fleet would be based in home waters. This was the case when, around 1567, a Royal Dockyard was established at Chatham, Kent, on the bank of the River Medway. At that time, HM Ships would often lay at anchor either within the river, on Chatham Reach or Gillingham Reach, or beyond it, around The Nore.

Chatham Dockyard had its disadvantages, however. The vagaries of wind and tide, coupled with the restricted depth of the river, meant that vessels entering the river, for repairs or to replenish supplies at Chatham, could be delayed for considerable lengths of time. What was an inconvenience at times of peace became a serious impediment at times of war; and for this reason, warships based in the Nore would tend if possible to avoid entering the river, and would try to do all but the most serious repairs while afloat and at anchor. At the same time, those who were responsible for supplying warships with their weapons, victuals and equipment were obliged to ferry items to and from The Nore using small boats.

In order to operate more effectively, the Navy Board began to explore options for developing a new dockyard at the mouth of the Medway, able to be accessed by ships directly from the North Sea and Thames Estuary. Possible locations were explored on both the Isle of Grain and the Isle of Sheppey; the Board decided on a location at the north-west tip of Sheppey alongside a derelict 16th-century blockhouse (built to supplement the Henrician defences of the Thames): Sheerness.

== Seventeenth-century origins ==
=== The first dockyard and planned fortification ===
In March 1665, following a declaration of war against the Netherlands, Peter Pett (the Resident Commissioner at Chatham) had a wooden storehouse built within a compound on the promontory of Sheerness, for the better provisioning of the warships anchored at The Nore. Soon afterwards, war-damaged ships began to be dispatched to Sheerness for repair, and Pett was sent there to oversee the necessary work. A Master Attendant was appointed, to supervise the movement of ships in the vicinity. Shipwrights were hastily relocated from Deptford, Woolwich and elsewhere, an ad hoc collection of sheds and jetties were put in place and a 'graving place' was set aside on the shore for ships to be careened if required (the mud banks in the area were regularly used for careening).

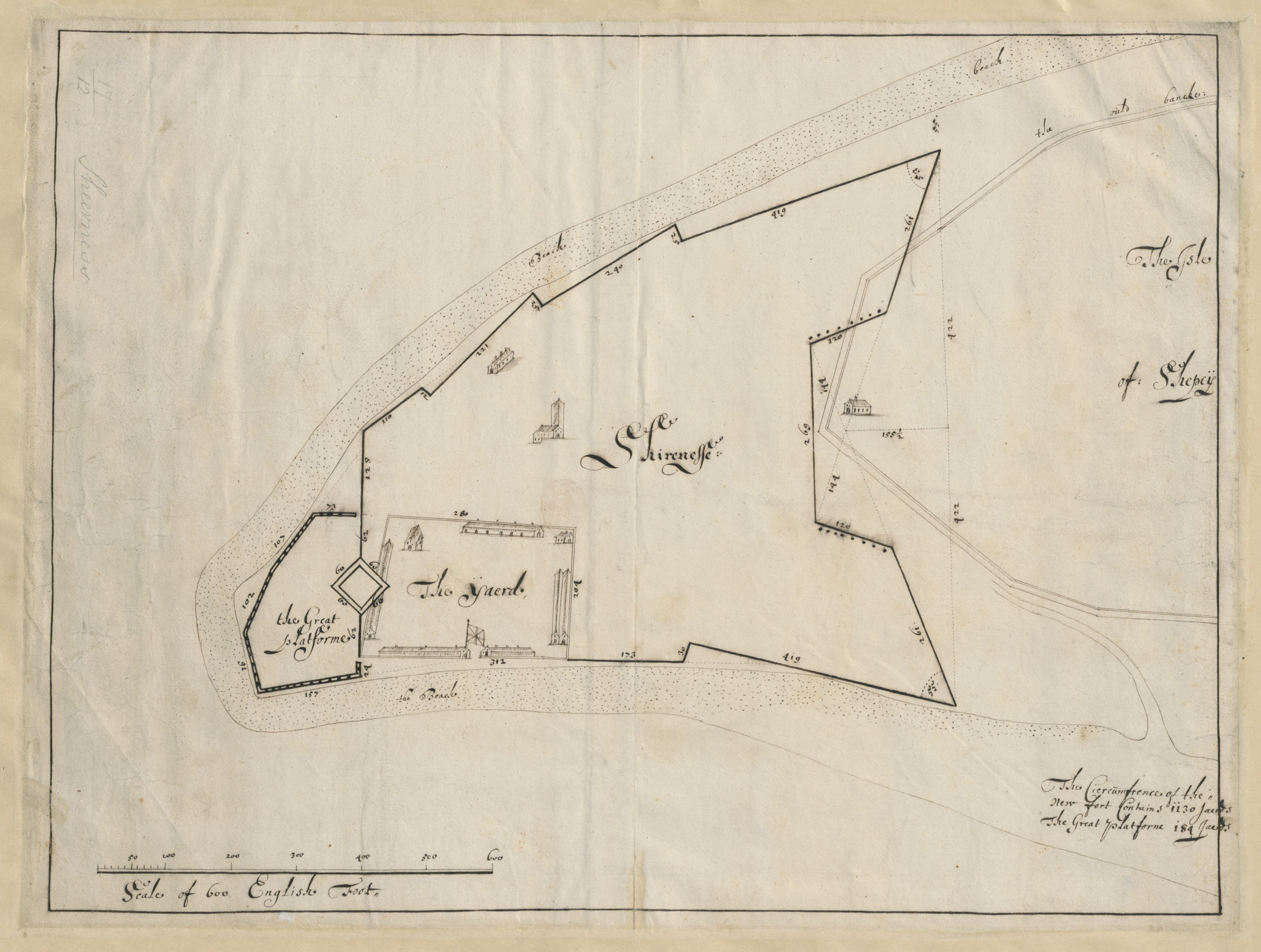
Sir Bernard De Gomme's 1667 design for a new fort at Sheerness, surrounding the original (1665) dockyard. (North is to the left).

By July that same year, Pett had drawn up plans for a proper dockyard to be built on the site. Samuel Pepys, who was Clerk of the Acts of the Navy Board, issued authorisation for the works to begin and later recorded visiting Sheerness to measure out the site for the new dockyard. The plan was for a rectangular compound, containing a mast house, a store shed and a smith's forge, together with houses for the carpenter and the storekeeper, and two gated slips on the river side. By November the yard was operational, and several large ships were sent there for repairs during the winter (albeit the yard struggled due to a lack of workers and materials).

Pett had further plans for the development of the site, including a dry dock in place of the careening facility; he also advised fortifying the area to the north of the yard. Progress in this regard was slow, however, and it was not until early 1667 that the Board of Ordnance asked Sir Bernard de Gomme to assess the ground and draw up proposals. The King and the Duke of York visited the site in February of that year, and (after further refinements were made to the design) building work began on 27 April.

==== The Dutch Raid and its aftermath ====
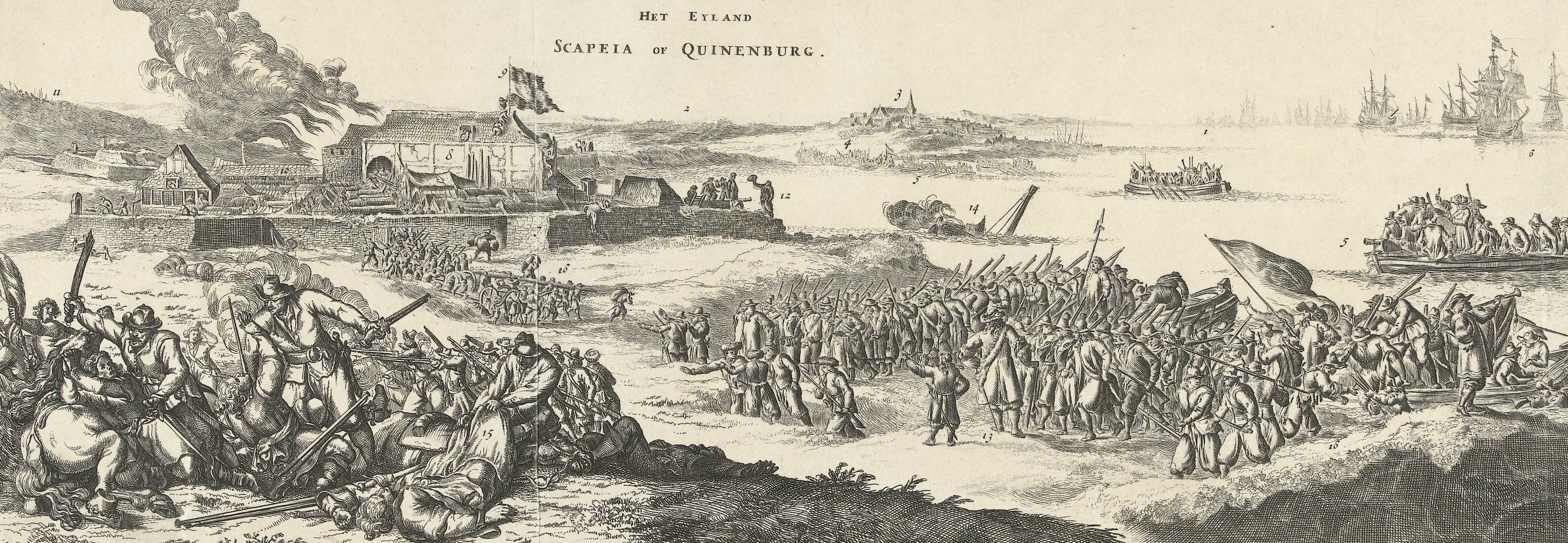
Dutch newsprint illustration showing the raiders raising the Dutch flag over the fort at Sheerness (left) and beyond it the dockyard in flames.

The situation was overtaken, however, by the escalating Anglo-Dutch conflict: on 10 June 1667 the still-incomplete fort was easily captured, together with the adjacent dockyard, by the Dutch Navy and used as the base for a daring raid on the English ships at anchor in the Medway. After their stocks of guns, ammunition and naval stores had been plundered both the fort and the dockyard were left in flames, along with a significant number of the ships moored in the river.

A Parliamentary report on the causes of the humiliating raid concluded that it 'was chiefly occasioned by the neglect of finishing the fort at Sheerenesse'. After the raid, the authorities moved quickly to repair the damage and complete the fortification of Sheerness.

=== The second dockyard and completed fortifiation ===
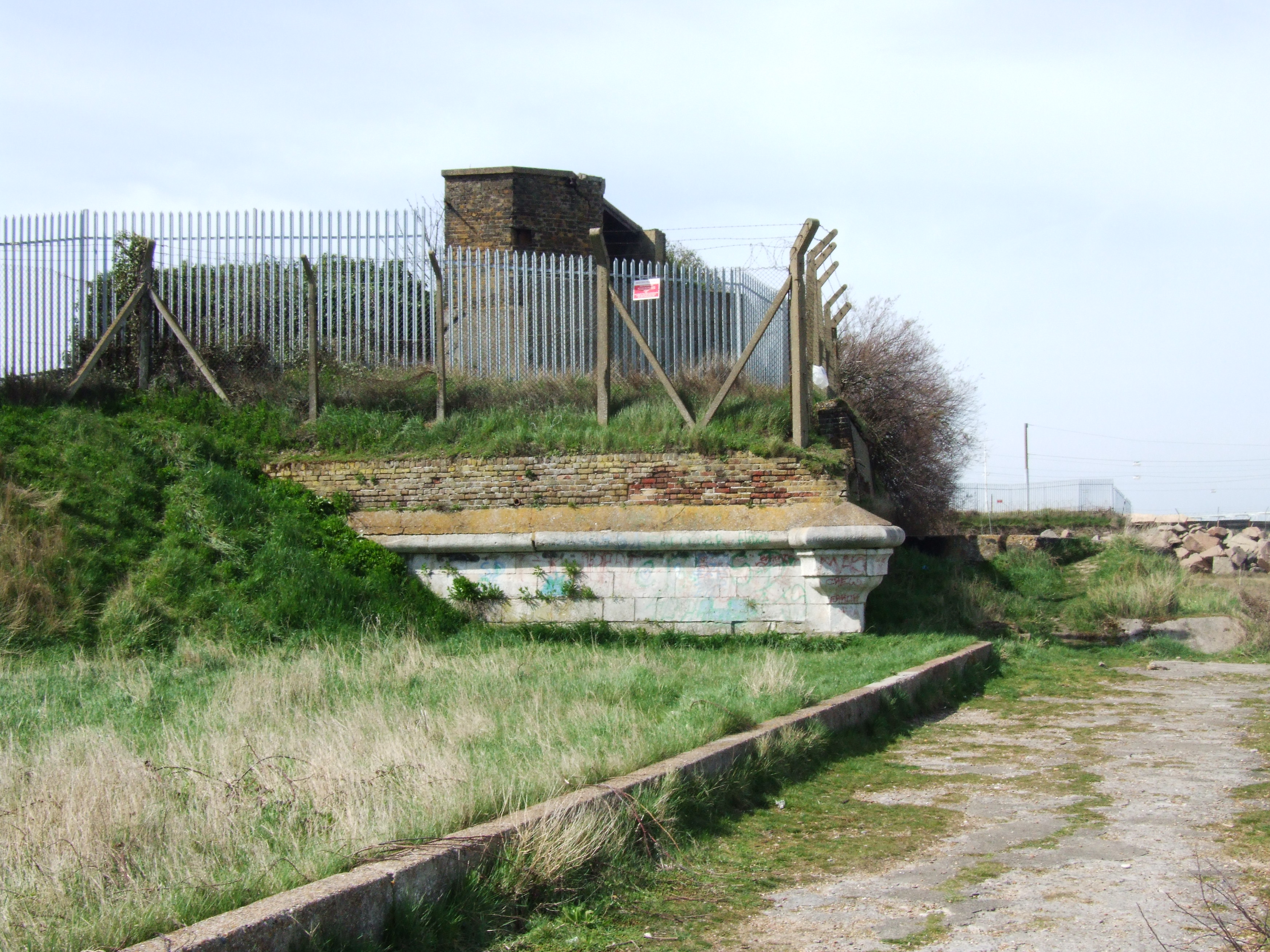
Remnant of de Gomme's indented line on the eastern shore of Sheerness.

Work on the fortifications was undertaken swiftly in accordance with de Gomme's designs: the Tudor blockhouse (which became the Governor's residence) was strengthened, and encircled by a semi-circular gun battery to the north; while to the south a line of fortification was constructed, which cut off the northernmost part of Sheerness behind a flooded ditch. Enclosed by walls to the west and east, the garrisoned fort took up most of the area to the north of the ditch leaving just a small parcel of land on the Medway side, between the western wall of the fort and the river, for the dockyard to occupy. A gateway through this wall, accessed from the dockyard, provided the main entrance to the fort; the gatehouse was a prominent feature and contained a chapel on its first floor. By the beginning of August the new fort was substantially structurally complete and it was equipped with thirty guns.

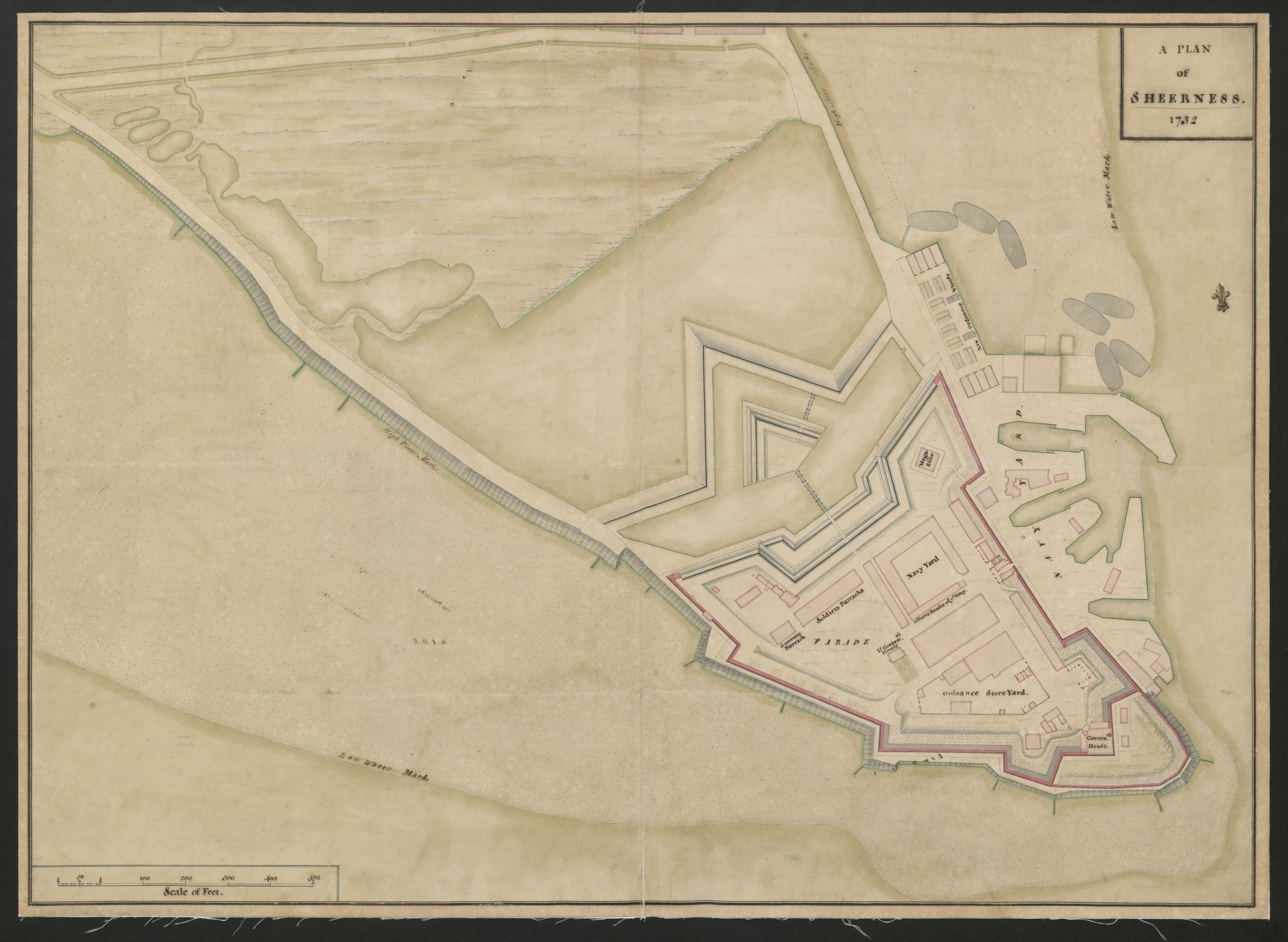
A Plan of Sheerness, 1732, shows the fort and adjacent dockyard much as laid out in 1667–72. (North is to the bottom right).

Work then began on the dockyard. A scarcity of available housing, the absence of a nearby water supply and the likelihood of contracting ague from the surrounding marshland all led to a lack of workers and caused construction delays. Nevertheless, by 1672 the yard was likewise largely structurally complete. The following year saw the first officers appointed to certain key positions in the yard: John Shish as Master Shipwright, Samuel Hunter as Clerk of the Cheque and John Daniell as Storekeeper.

In 1677 a number of dockyard-related buildings were constructed within the walls of the fort. Beyond the gatehouse was an avenue, with a double row of houses for the senior officers of the yard on one side, and a large quadrangular naval store yard on the other. Within the fort, the Navy's buildings occupied a sizeable area close to the gatehouse, while the Ordnance Board had its own store yard and associated buildings to the north. The parade ground and barracks for the military garrison lay to the east, at the end of the aforementioned avenue.

Sheerness Dockyard initially functioned as an extension to that at Chatham and it was overseen by Chatham's resident Commissioner for much of its early history (until the 1790s). It was conceived primarily for the routine repair and maintenance of naval ships; no shipbuilding took place there (with one small exception) until 1691. While minor repairs were undertaken at Sheerness, ships requiring major work were usually sent on to Chatham, Woolwich or Deptford. Sheerness also functioned at this time as a cruiser base, for vessels patrolling the North Sea and the eastern reaches of the Channel.

== Eighteenth-century developments ==
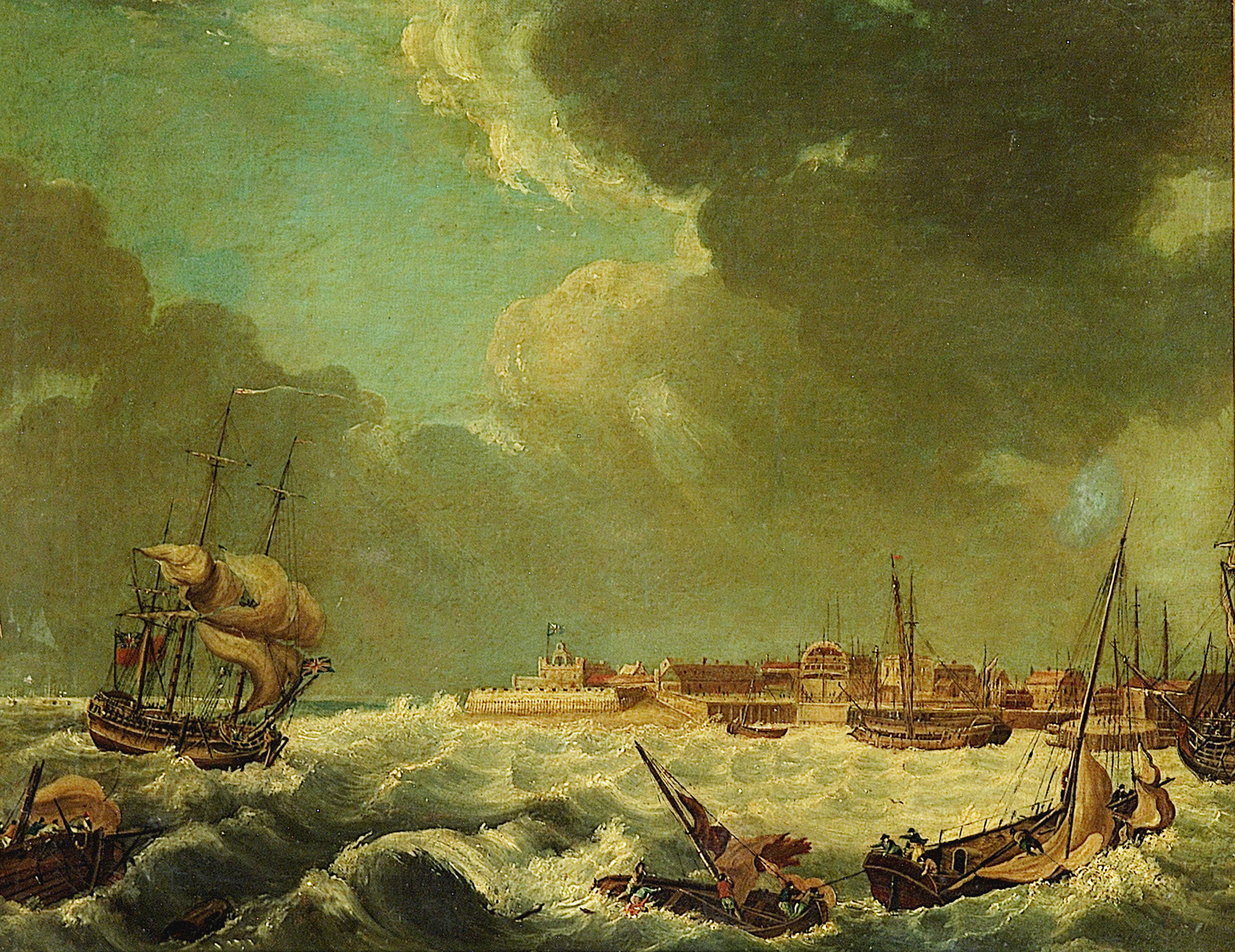
A view of Sheerness, c.1750, showing (left to right) the Governor's house (with flag), the mast house, a ship under construction on the slip, the tall white garrison gatehouse and various storehouses.

Construction of amenities in and around the dockyard continued into the eighteenth century. The first dry-dock was not completed until 1708; a second was added in 1720. Access to the two dry docks was by way of a tidal basin, tellingly known as the Mud Dock; there was a small shipbuilding slip to its north and in c.1730 an ordnance wharf was added to the south, with timber stores and a mast pond beyond.

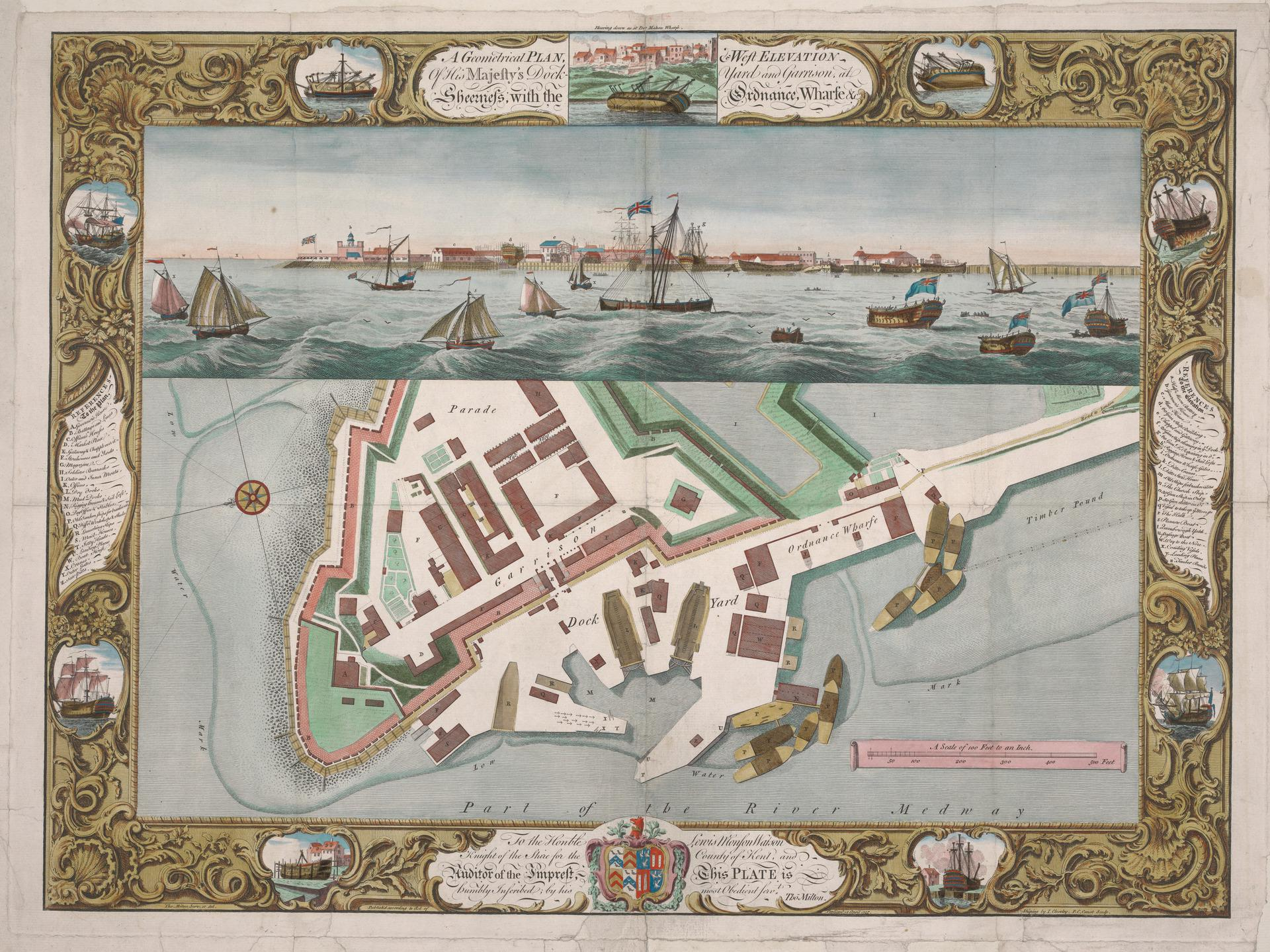
A Geometrical Plan, & West Elevation of His Majesty's Dock-Yard and Garrison at Sheerness, with the Ordnance Wharfe &c. (T. Milton, 1775).

The constricted area of land available to the dockyard caused problems for its operation and development. Several hulks were positioned on the foreshore close to the dockyard, initially to serve as breakwaters, but soon they served to accommodate both personnel and dockyard activities. The space between the hulks (and, as they began to rot, the hulks themselves) were progressively infilled with soil, with new hulks then being added as part of the process. In this way, the land occupied by the dockyard began to expand (as is clearly seen in a surviving model of the dockyard, created in 1774 and now in the National Maritime Museum) By this time two more dry docks had been added, and over the next ten years living conditions were substantially improved by the sinking of a well to provide drinking water (which had previously had to be ferried in). By 1800 the Dockyard filled all available space and in addition was continuing to make use of several buildings within the walls of the Garrison Fort.

=== Outer fortifications ===
In 1796, following the development of Blue Town, a wider area of land (including the new houses) was enclosed behind a bastioned trace, which was further strengthened during the Napoleonic Wars of the following century. In addition, a defensive straight canal had been dug south of Mile Town in 1782, two miles in length, stretching from the Medway to the Thames.

=== Workers' housing ===
Very unusually, at Sheerness the Navy Board provided accommodation for the civilian workers of the dockyard and their families (in the hope of attracting people to work there). There being no established settlement in the vicinity of Sheerness, most of the workers were initially housed temporarily in hulks moored nearby. In the 1680s the Board was petitioned by the officers of the yard to make 'some provision of habitations' for the workers and their families, who were 'suffering through the unwholesomeness of the place'. The Board acceded to the request and soon afterwards built four barrack-like lodgings for workers (such as shipwrights and artificers) alongside the naval store yard within the walls of the fort. Further accommodation was provided on the hulks which functioned as breakwaters on the foreshore.

In 1734 the workers' lodgings were rebuilt in brick; they would again be rebuilt in 1794. By 1774 nearly a thousand people were accommodated in the lodgings and the hulks. When John Wesley visited in 1767, he described the latter as follows: 'In the Dock adjoining to the Fort, there are six old men of war. These are divided into small tenements, forty, fifty or sixty in a ship, with little chimneys and windows, and each of these contained a family. In one of them where we called, a man and his wife and six little children lived; and yet all the ship was sweet and tolerably clean, sweeter than most sailing ships I have been in'. In 1802 the workers and their families were evicted from the hulks, which by then had gained a reputation of being 'a common resort of Whores and Rogues, by day and by night'. In the 1820s, provision of accommodation within the fort was also discontinued; by this time cheaper housing was to be had nearby in the civilian settlements of Blue Town and Mile Town.

==== Blue Town and Mile Town ====
By 1738, dockyard construction workers had begun to build their own houses close to the ramparts, using materials they were allowed to take from the yard. They were clinker-built, like ships; and the grey-blue naval paint they used on the exteriors led to their homes becoming known as the Blue Houses. This was eventually corrupted to Blue Town (which is now the name of the north-west area of Sheerness lying just beyond the current dockyard perimeter). The modern town of Sheerness has its origins in Mile Town, which was established later in the 18th century at a mile's distance from the dockyard (Blue Town having by then filled the space available).

== The Great Rebuilding ==
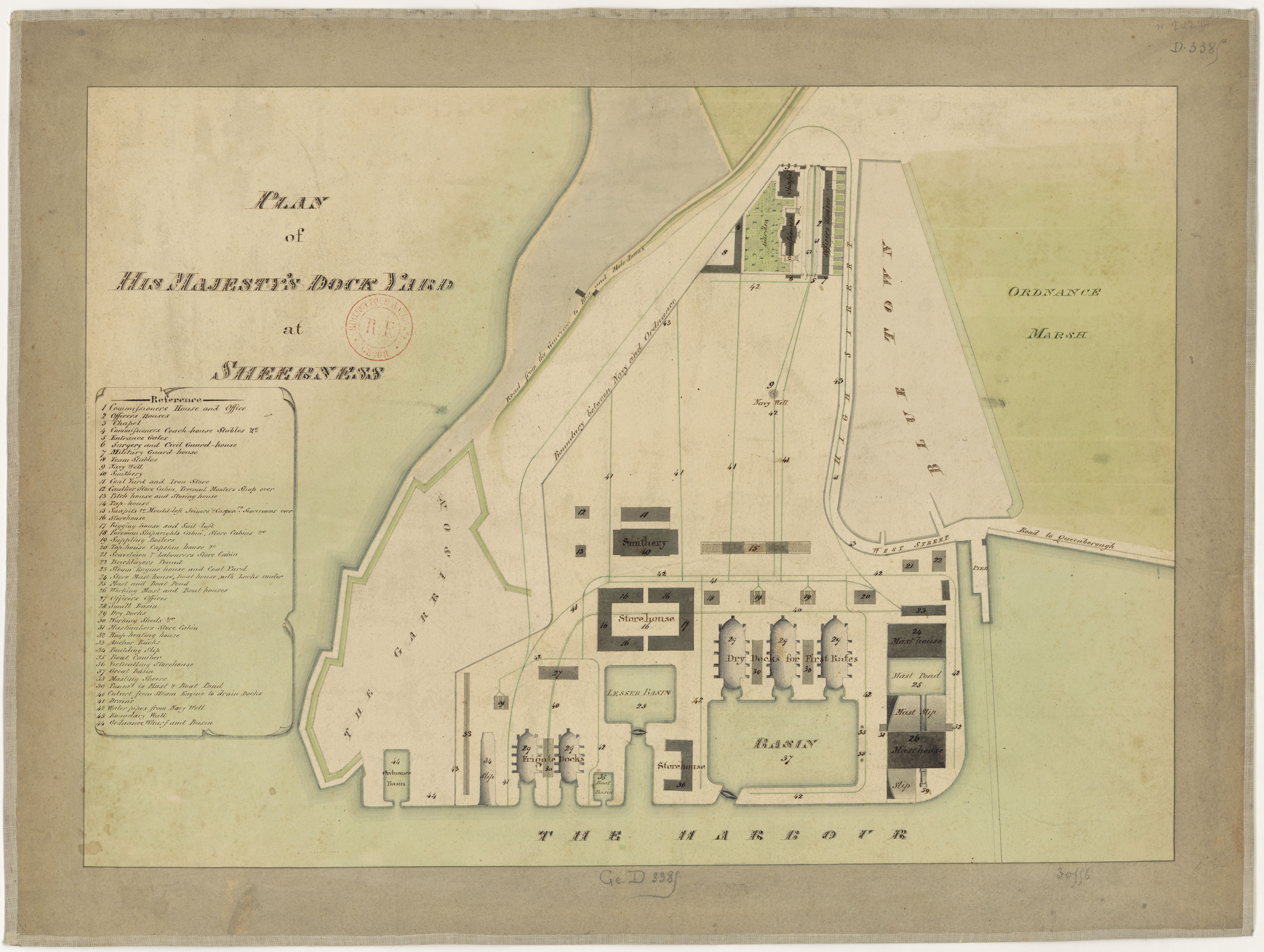
Plan for the rebuilding of the dockyard. (As built, the area to the north (left) of the Lesser Basin and the houses to the east (top right) were laid out differently.)

By the early nineteenth century, the old hulks underpinning the reclaimed land of the Dockyard were seriously decaying and the site was becoming increasingly unstable. The Dockyard, however, was getting busier, since it (unlike the nearby Chatham, Woolwich and Deptford yards) was not prone to silting. By 1810, designs had been submitted to the Controller of the Navy by both Samuel Bentham and John Rennie the Elder for a relatively modest rebuilding of the yard. Over the next three years, both Bentham and Rennie produced far more ambitious schemes: first, in 1812, Bentham drew up a radical panopticon-inspired proposal for the site, with docks, slips and storehouses all radiating from a central hub, which was occupied by a six-storey hexagonal office block; but it was Rennie's 1813 plan that gained approval.

After the end of the Napoleonic Wars, the old Sheerness Dockyard was closed in 1815 and work began to Rennie's meticulous designs. The principal architect was Surveyor of Buildings to the Navy Board, Edward Holl, assisted by William Miller. After Holl's death in 1823, George L. Taylor (an established architect with a practice in London responsible for some of London's most fashionable squares) took over as principal. The plan was for an entirely new dockyard, at 56 acres more than double the size of the old one. The site's quicksand and mud banks provided a substantial civil engineering challenge; thousands of wooden piles had to be put in place to support the inverted arch foundations of the docks, wharves, basins and buildings. A scale-model created at the time shows in great detail the original design (foundations included) of each element.

In all the project cost £2,586,083 and was largely complete by 1830. Sheerness was unusual among Dockyards in the unity and clarity of its design, having been built in one phase of construction, of a single architectural style according to a unified plan (rather than developing piecemeal over time).

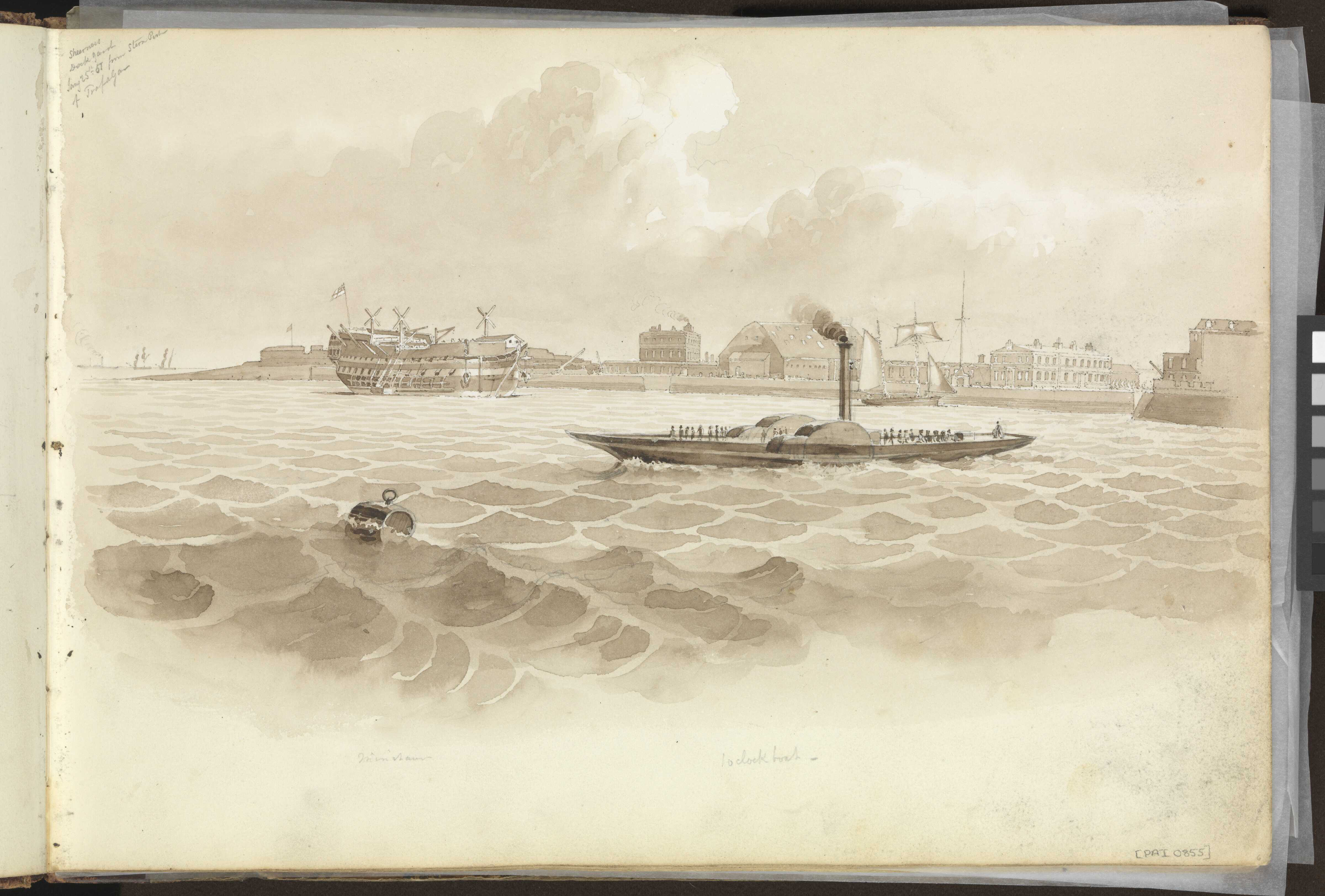
The northern part of the rebuilt Dockyard as seen from the river, 1850: (l-r) Garrison Point, (HMS Minotaur - receiving hulk), Admiralty House, covered Slip, (a schooner), flagstaff, the Dockyard Offices, the entrance to the Small Basin and part of the Victualling Store; in the foreground a naval picket boat.

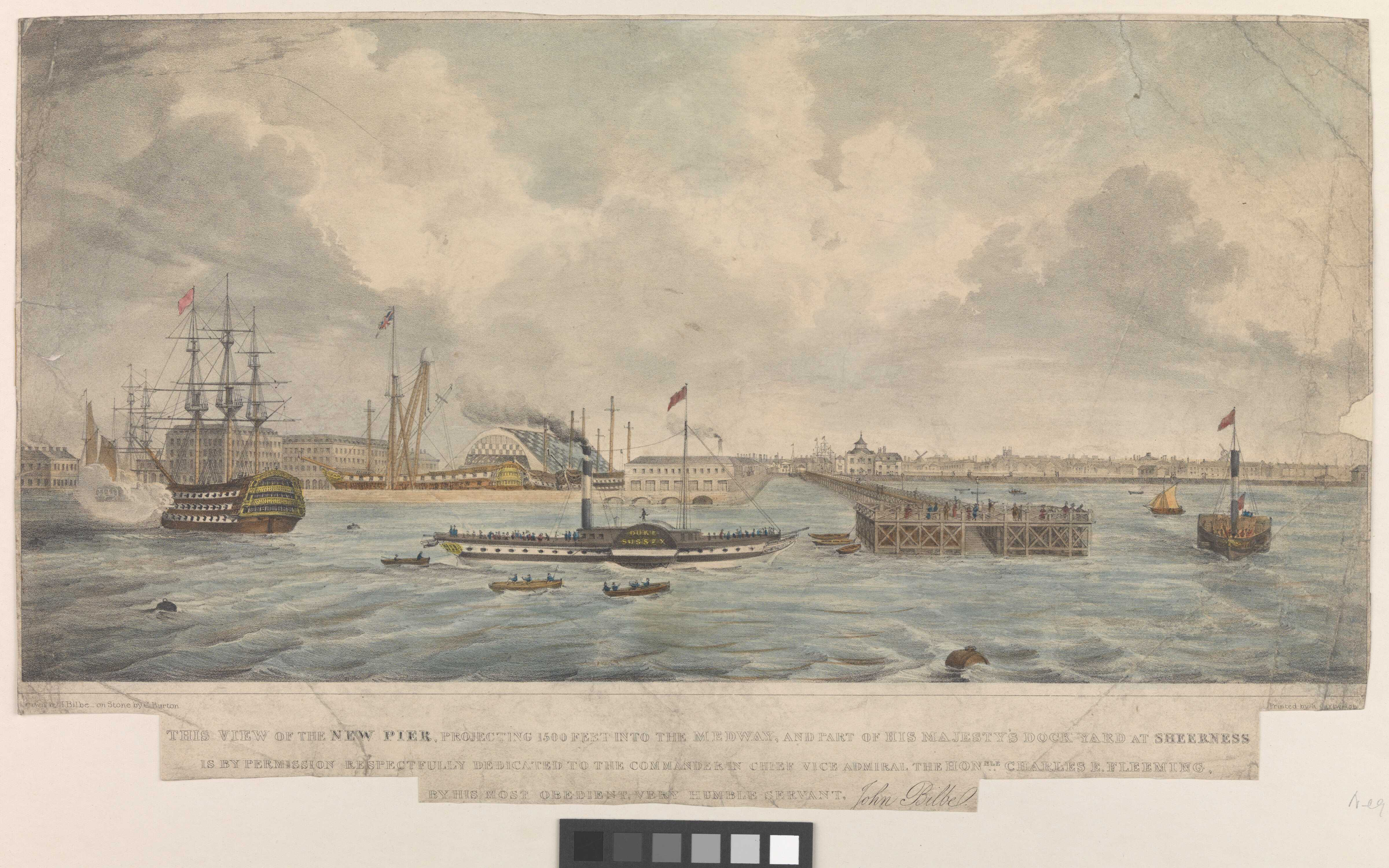
The southern part of the rebuilt Dockyard as seen from the river, c.1835: (l-r) part of the Dockyard Offices, the Victualling Store, Quadrangle Storehouse, covered No.2 Dock, Working Mast House, the new Town Pier, Blue Town.

=== Layout ===
The site was approximately triangular in shape when viewed from the air: Rennie's perimeter wall (1824–31) was built south-east from the Boat Basin (at the northernmost tip of the yard) running parallel with the Thames Estuary foreshore as far as the main gate, after which the wall (as can still be seen) turned southwards past the officers' houses, before turning sharply and continuing in a westerly direction as far as the river (though deviating south again at one point to accommodate the mast houses at the southern end of the site); the river then made up the third side of the triangle.

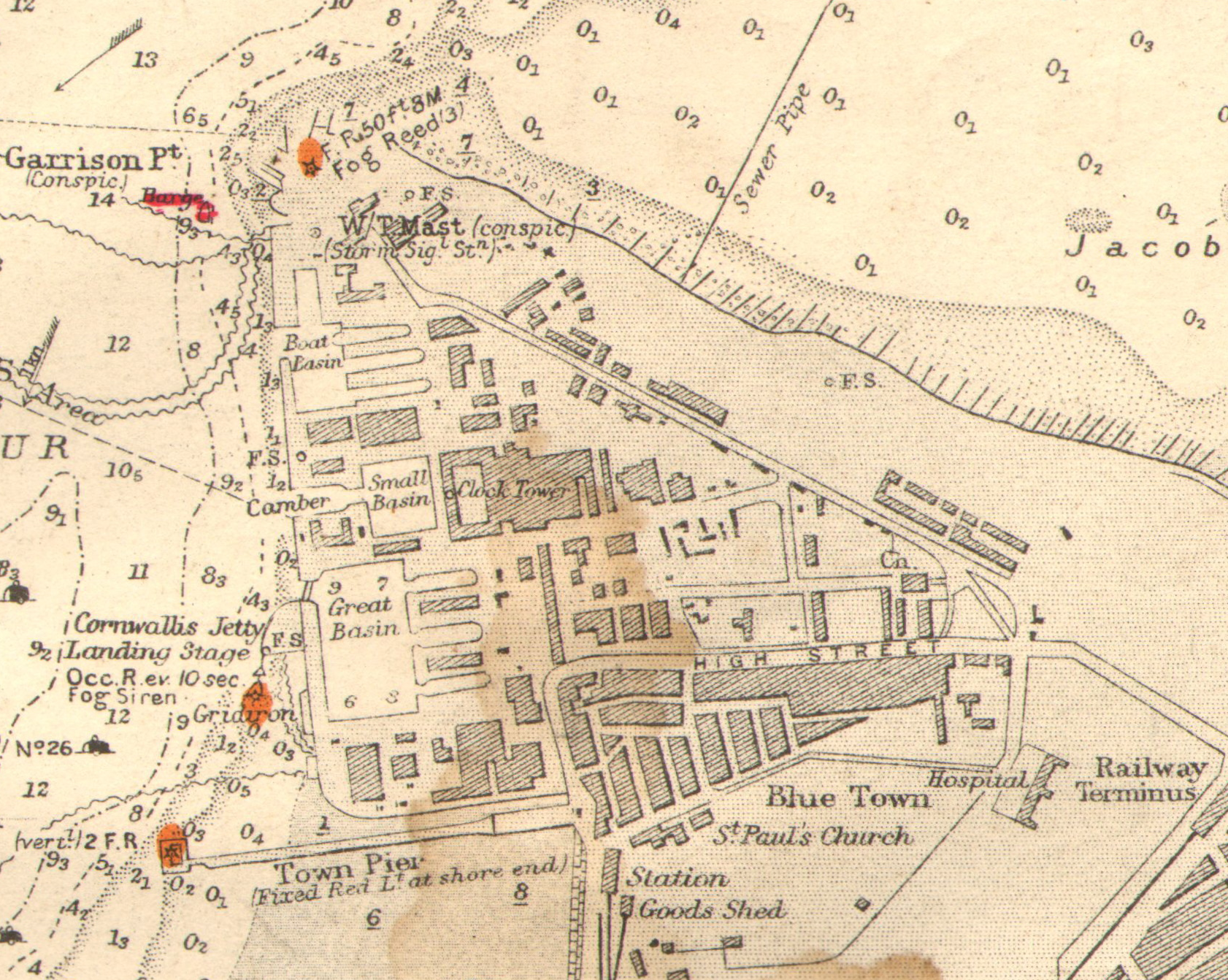
Plan of the rebuilt dockyard (as depicted on an Admiralty Chart in 1930). Garrison Point is at the top; the River Medway is on the left and the Thames Estuary top right.

The principal buildings and structures were laid out along the bank of the Medway; from north (i.e. Garrison Point) to South, these were:

- The Ordnance Store and Wharf (a self-contained compound with its own basin, accessed via the Boat Basin).
- The Boat Basin, providing access to:
  - No.1 (Building) Slip 200ft long
  - No.5 (Frigate) Dock (1819) 176ft long (but converted from a 'frigate dock' to a 'graving dock' in 1825)
  - No.4 (Frigate) Dock (1819) 177ft long
- The Working Boat House (with boat slip giving access to the basin)
- The Dockyard Offices (1821)
- The Small Basin (used by supply craft), providing access to:
  - The Quadrangle Storehouse (1824–29; a landmark five-storey building topped by a clock tower)
- The Victualling Storehouse (1826; facing the Offices across the entrance to the Small Basin)
- The Great Basin (its entrance placed off-centre leaving room for a sizeable set of masting sheers), providing access to:
  - No.3 Dock (1819) 225ft long
  - No.2 Dock (1819) 225ft long
  - No.1 Dock (1819) 225ft long
- A pair of Mast Houses (1826) with a Mast Pond between them.

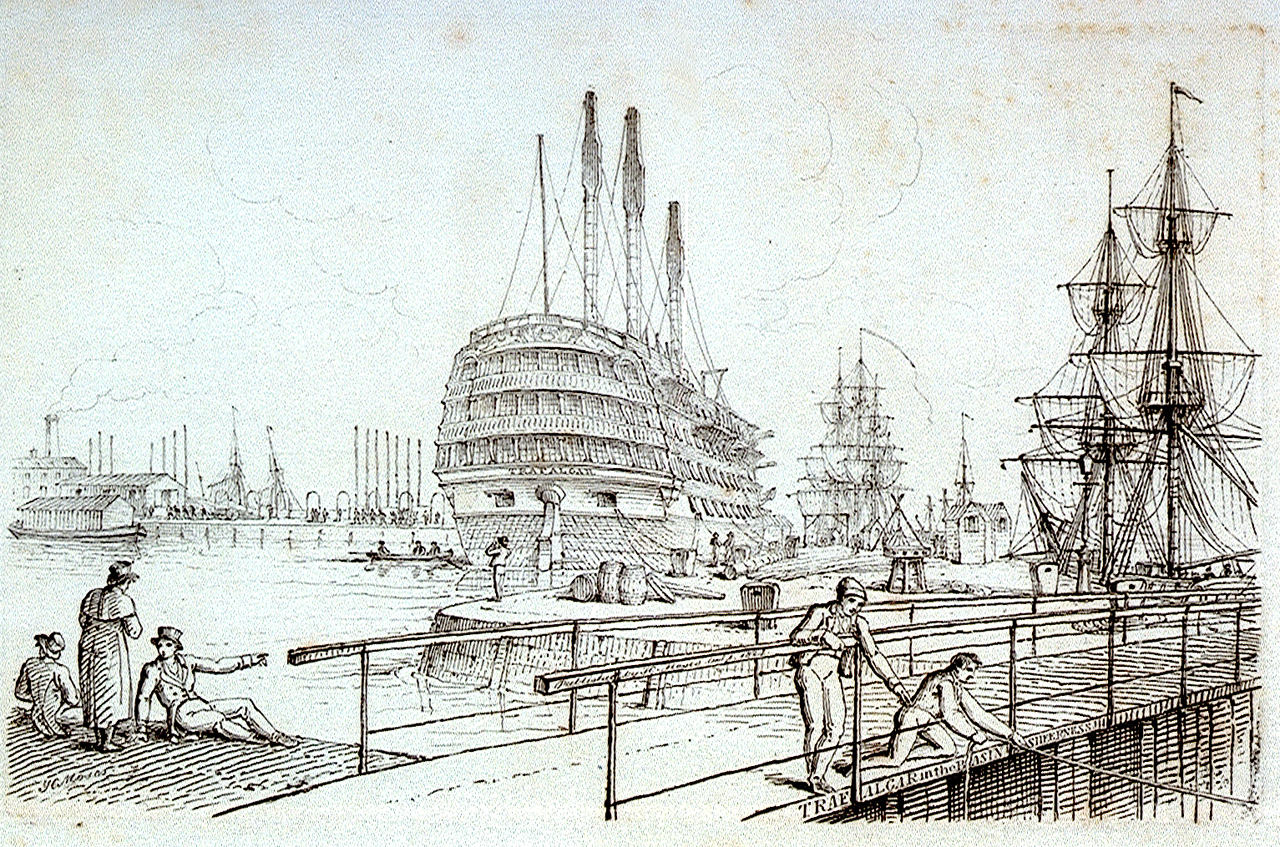
HMS Trafalgar, with her upper masts and spars removed, in the Great Basin at Sheerness (sketch by Henry Moses, 1824).

The Great Basin, with its three dry docks, formed the Dockyard's centre of operations; they were designed to accommodate First Rate Ships of the Line. It was the first area of the yard to be completed and was formally opened by the Duke of Clarence (later King William IV) on 5 September 1823. (The next areas to be completed were the Small Basin and the Boat Basin, with its smaller pair of docks; construction of major buildings continuing for several years afterwards.) As part of Rennie's co-ordinated plan, all the dry docks were connected by a single culvert to the pump house in the south of the yard.

Behind the three larger dry docks (Nos.1-3) were a pair of suppling kilns (1828), beyond which a long two-storey building (known today as the Archway Block, 1830) was built to Holl's design; it consisted of five interlinked blocks, each of five bays, housing saw pits and seasoning stores on the ground floor, with mould lofts, joiners' shops and other stores accommodated above. Its eponymous archway spanned a main east–west road in the Dockyard, at the far end of which stood the Dockyard Chapel (1828).

Behind the Quadrangular Storehouse, and equal to it in length, the Smithery was built (begun in 1822). Further north, another suppling kiln and a smaller saw-pit building (1828) served the other docks (Nos. 4 & 5); there was also a pitch house (1829) nearby, designed by Taylor. Further south, behind the mast houses, there was a small foundry; it was destined to grow significantly in later years as use of metal in shipbuilding vastly increased.

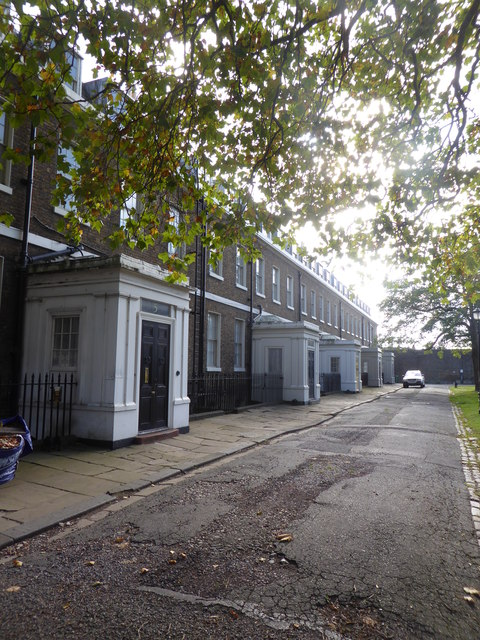
Dockyard Terrace

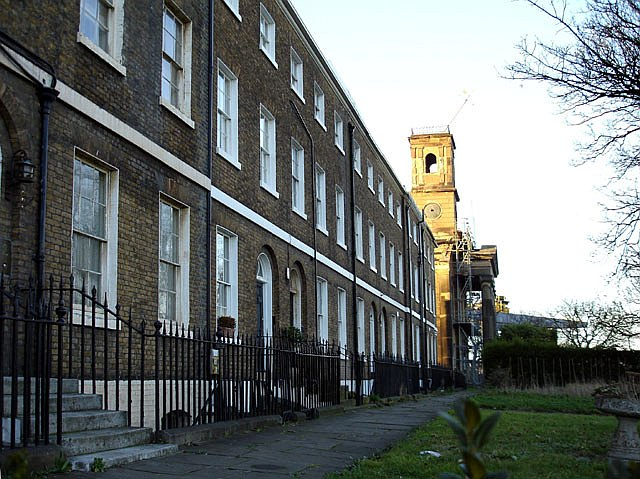
Naval Terrace and the Dockyard Church.

At the east end of the site, near the chapel, were grouped the main residential buildings pertaining to the senior officers of the Dockyard:

- Dockyard House (1825) for the Captain Superintendent;
- Dockyard Terrace (1827) for the Commander of the Dockyard and other senior officers;
- Naval Terrace (1833) for more junior offices;
- Boatswain's House (1826) for the boatswain.

The chapel (and the Naval Terrace alongside it) were placed outside the perimeter wall of the Dockyard.

The area between the residences at the east end and the basins and docks to the west was initially kept clear, in large part, to allow for storage of timber; though the artesian well (dated, on the Well House, to 1800) which had so transformed life in the old Dockyard, was located here in relative isolation. In addition, the yard's Pay Office with its strong room (1828) was placed in this area, not too far from the main gate.

==== The Garrison and fortifications ====
The land to the north of the rebuilt Dockyard, lying between the perimeter wall and the Estuary foreshore, was almost entirely given over to the Garrison, which had been displaced by the rebuilding. On a long narrow strip of land was built officers' accommodation, guard houses, barrack blocks, a parade ground and (within the bastion at the southern end of the site) a gunpowder magazine.

Along the estuary foreshore, a further line of fortification was constructed, connecting de Gomme's defences at the northern end with those south of Blue Town. All along the foreshore, a series of guns were placed; and in 1850 a new gun battery was installed in the Centre Bastion, designed to work in tandem with the new Grain Tower gun emplacement on the opposite side of the river. Ten years later, work began on replacing the old semi-circular gun battery on the promontory with a new casemated fort to replace the old blockhouse: Garrison Point Fort.

Further south, the defensive canal (now known as Queenborough Lines) was also strengthened with a gun battery at either end.

==== Admiralty House ====
Between what became known as Garrison Point and the Garrison itself stood Admiralty House, a large residence built in 1829 for the Port Admiral. In May 1827, the Duke of Clarence, newly appointed to the office of Lord High Admiral, had ordered its construction on land purchased from the Board of Ordnance. The Duke himself did not make use of it (despite persistent rumours that he planned to move in); instead, Vice-Admiral Sir John Beresford took up residence and it went on to accommodate him and his successors as Commander-in-Chief, The Nore until 1907 (after which it housed the Commander-in-Chief, Home Fleet).

=== Mechanisation ===
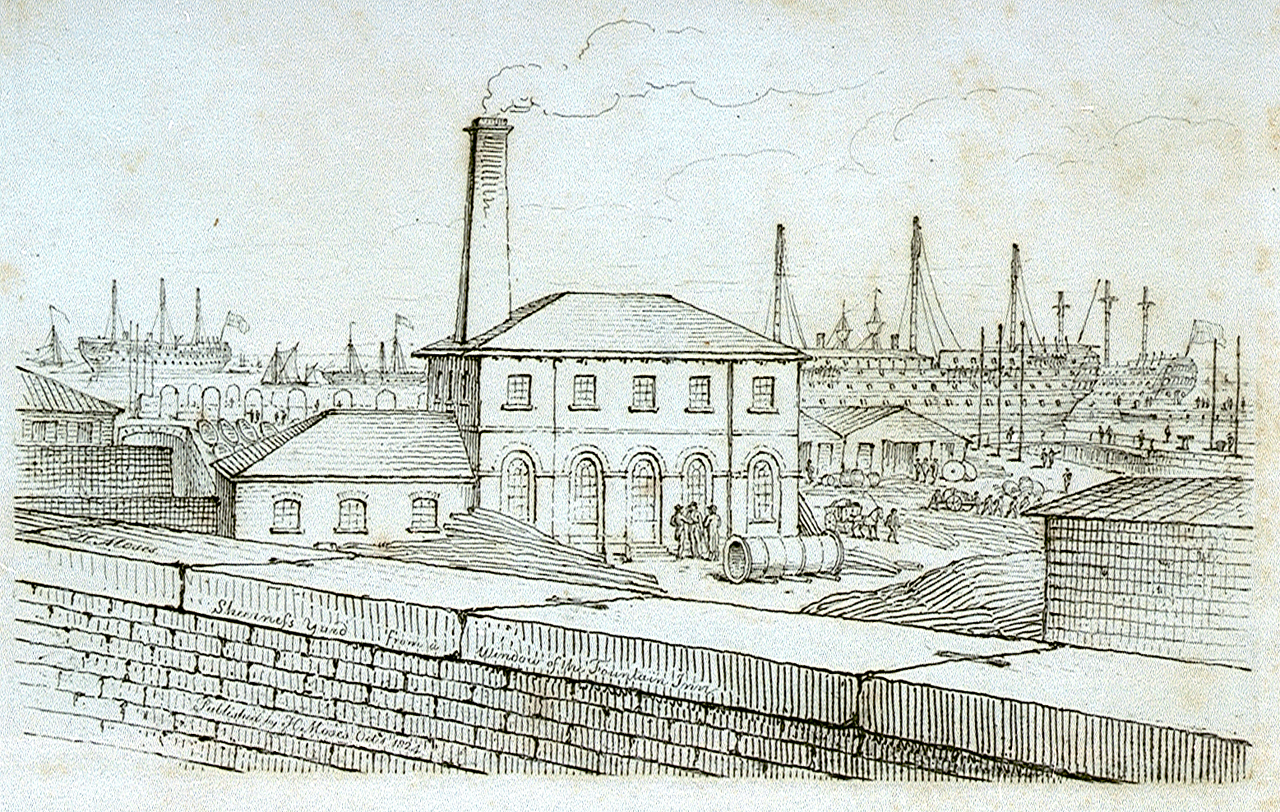
The Engine House, seen over the perimeter wall in 1824. As here, steam power was first used in the Royal Dockyards to drain the dry docks.

Before the rebuilding of Sheerness was complete, the Admiralty was beginning to invest in steam propulsion for warships, with the opening of its first Steam Factory at Woolwich Dockyard in 1831. This marked the start of an era of fast-paced technological change, and in the 1840s massive expansion took place at Portsmouth and Devonport to provide new basins and docks, which were served by factories, foundries, boiler-makers, fitting-shops and other facilities for mechanical engineering. The Royal Navy was still for the most part a sailing Navy at this stage, with steam providing auxiliary power rather than the main means of propulsion; this was to change over the course of the next thirty years.

The rebuilt Sheerness, which had been designed primarily for the repair and maintenance of sailing ships, soon found itself having to adapt to the changing demands of steam technology. Most particularly, because Chatham Dockyard was not expanded and adapted for steam until the 1860s, Sheerness found itself under pressure to provide interim facilities for repair and maintenance of steam-powered ships based in the Nore. This became an immediate priority with the outbreak of the Crimean War: so in 1854, a new Steam Factory was built 'in haste' at Sheerness by Godfrey Greene, with the second mast house being converted into an engineering foundry and fitting shop. By 1868 just under 500 men and boys were employed in the factory; sited in the south part of the Dockyard, it was served by its own entrance (later called the South Gate) in the perimeter wall. Also in 1854, No.1 Dock and No.3 Dock were both lengthened to accommodate the larger ships now coming in for repair.

The main Smithery, which stood behind the Quadrangle Store, had been provided with steam-powered hammers in 1846, and steam technology began to be used in various other parts of the yard; for instance, in 1856-8 a new steam-powered saw mill was built, to Greene's designs, replacing the manual saw pits built just 25 years earlier. Greene built a second Smithery in 1856, alongside the first, this time with an all-metal frame; a technique he took to new heights in 1858–60 with the building of a four-storey Boat Store (behind the Working Boat House), remarkable for its size, for its 'efficient storage and handling arrangement' and above all for its remarkable structural innovations: 'The all-metal frame was made rigid by portal bracing, subsequently adopted by the skyscraper pioneers in Chicago, and universal for modern steel-framed building'.

The introduction of ironclad warships after Crimea led to further new buildings in and around the Dockyard. An assortment of mechanical workshops - fitting shops, bending shops, boiler shops - began to fill available space around the basins and docks, and by the end of the century the old Working Mast House had become a Shipwright's Machine Shop, nestled among foundries and factories.

== Shipbuilding at Sheerness ==
Plans for the 14-gun sloop HMS Atlanta, 'Built in his Majesty's Yard, at Sheerness, and Launched the 12th day of August 1775'.

In 1824, the Admiralty declared that Sheerness would continue to serve primarily as a refitting base, leaving Chatham Dockyard to focus on shipbuilding. Provision of a single covered slip, however, indicates that (as in the old yard) some shipbuilding was also envisaged. In the second half of the century, dry docks began to be used for shipbuilding to some extent (especially as many of the old slips became too small for the fast-expanding size of new warships). At Sheerness, No.2 Dock was designated for this purpose and (like the slip) covered with a long pitched roof.

=== List of ships built at Sheerness ===
Beginning with a 7-gun ketch named Transporter in 1677, over 100 ships were built at Sheerness Dockyard over a 225-year period, including the following:

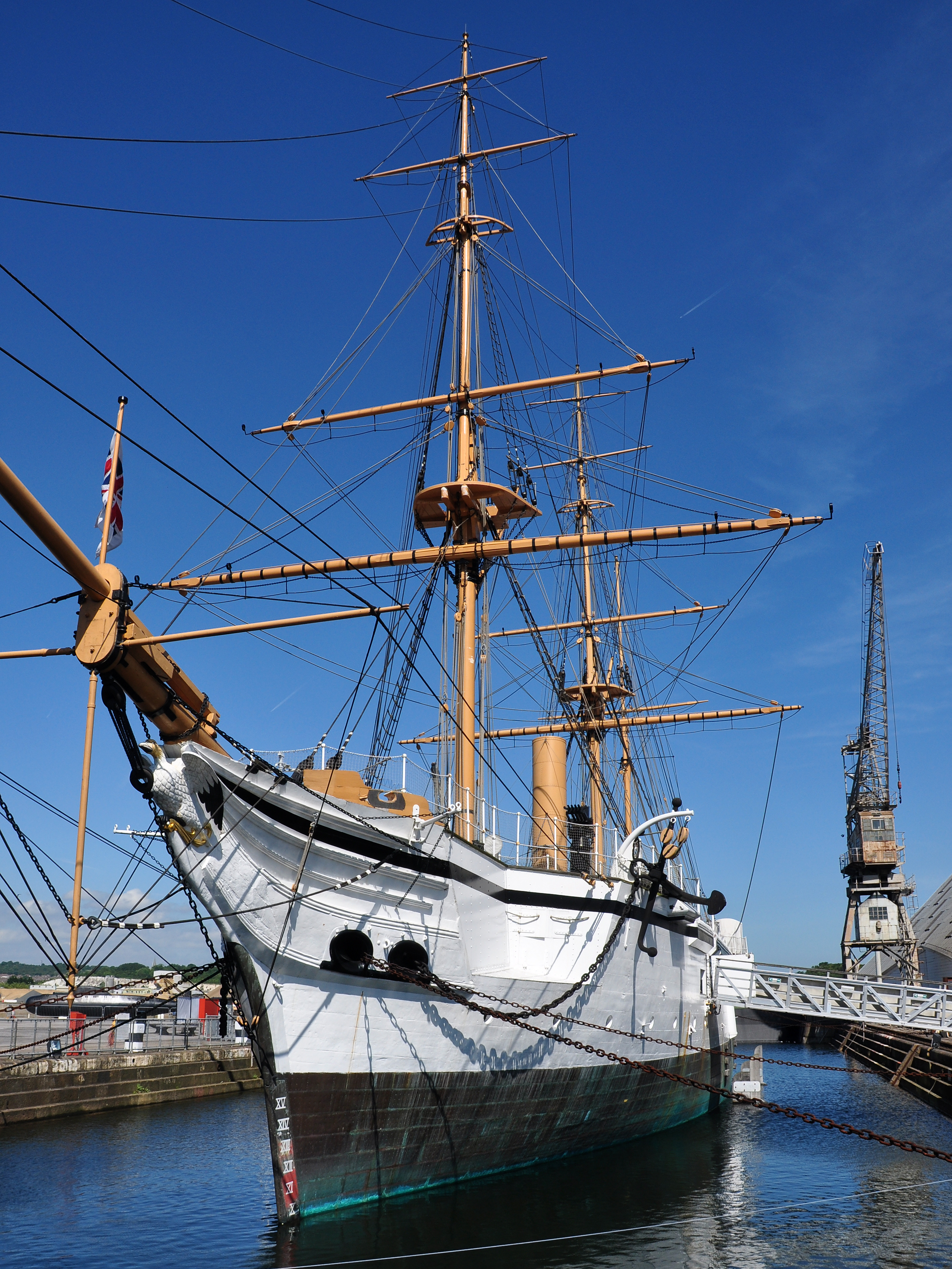
The sloop HMS Gannet at Chatham Historic Dockyard, launched at Sheerness in 1878; an example of the smaller size of warship that was built in Sheerness Dockyard.

- HMS Sheerness (1691)
- HMS Medway (1693)
- HMS Newcastle (1704)
- HMS Scarborough (1711)
- HMS Montreal (1761)
- HMS Solebay (1763)
- HMS Winchelsea (1764)
- HMS Carysfort (1766)
- HMS Bristol (1775)
- HMS Polyphemus (1782)
- HMS Mermaid (1784)
- HMS Daedelus (1826)
- HMS Vestal (1833)
- HMS Salamander (1832) - one of the first paddle steamers in the Royal Navy
- HMS Calliope (1837)
- HMS Acheron (1838)
- HMS Rattler (1843) - the first warship to use screw propulsion
- HMS Miranda (1851)
- HMS Clio (1858)
- HMS Diamond (1874) - the last purely wooden ship to be built at the dockyard
- HMS Gannet (1878) - the only surviving Sheerness-built vessel
- HMS Kingfisher (1879)
- HMS Pylades (1884) - the last classic corvette built for the Royal Navy
- HMS Buzzard (1887)
- HMS Goldfinch (1889)
- HMS Brilliant (1891)
- HMS Torch (1894)
- HMS Pelorus (1896)
- HMS Shearwater (1900)
- HMS Fantome (1901)
- HMS Clio (1903)
- HMS Cadmus (1903) - the last warship to be launched at Sheerness

In the early 20th century, the Admiralty decided that shipbuilding should cease at Sheerness to allow the yard to focus on a new specialised role: refitting torpedo boats and torpedo boat destroyers. Dry docks 4 and 5 were accordingly lengthened in 1906 to enable them to accommodate the latter, and in 1912 the roof over the old shipbuilding dock (No.2 Dock) was demolished. This specialised work continued through World War I. After the war, to keep the yard from closing, it was occasionally sent vessels built by private contractors that required completion (such as HMS Thracian and the submarine HMS L27). During World War Two, when a flotilla of minesweepers was based at Sheerness, a number of motor-launches were built at the yard; but, as in the previous conflict, the main business of the yard was refit and repair of ships on active service.

== Education and training ==
=== Barracks, Gunnery School and HMS Wildfire ===
In 1854, a wing of the Victualling Store, which stood alongside the entrance to the Small Basin, was converted to serve as a Naval Barracks: a unique pre-20th century example of a shore building in Britain being used as a barracks for naval personnel. It seems to have been used to house very young ordinary seamen under training but awaiting posting to a training ship.

Then, in 1892, the building as a whole was repurposed and reopened as a Royal Naval Gunnery School, providing specialist training in naval artillery. A training battery of 9-pounder guns was provided a few miles along the coast with a rifle range alongside. The school soon outgrew its accommodation; in 1908 it moved to new purpose-built accommodation alongside HMS Pembroke and the Victualling Store reverted to providing barracks accommodation.

In 1937, the same building again found a new use, this time being commissioned as a boys' training establishment: HMS Wildfire. It remained in commission until 1950; after closure, the 'Wildfire Building' (as it had come to be known) again reverted to providing accommodation until shortly before the closure of the Dockyard.

=== Dockyard apprentices ===
As at other Royal Dockyards, a school for apprentices was established at Sheerness in 1842. Fifty years later it was given its own purpose-built accommodation. It was (again in common with equivalent institutions elsewhere) renamed as the Dockyard Technical College in 1952, before closing a few years later along with the rest of the yard.

== Closure and aftermath ==
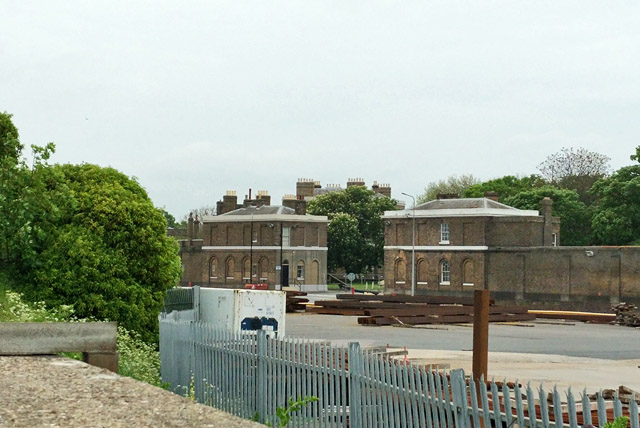
Main entrance in 2018: the old dockyard police station and police house (formerly linked by a colonnaded gateway, since demolished).

In February 1958 it was announced in Parliament that Sheerness Dockyard would close. The garrison was decommissioned in 1959 and on 31 March 1960 the closing ceremony took place for the Dockyard; the dockyard closure led to all 2,500 dockyard employees being made redundant. Once the Royal Navy had vacated Sheerness dockyard, a number of independent companies took over the running of the site for commercial use. These were brought together in October 1969 for form the Medway Ports Authority.

In 1959, the First Lord of the Admiralty had announced that 'Seventeen residences and eight other buildings, including the quadrangle, the old Admiralty House and the dockyard church, [had] been listed under Section 30 of the Town and Country Planning Act, 1947, as buildings of special architectural and historical interest.' Nevertheless, several of these very significant Dockyard buildings were demolished in the years that followed, including Admiralty House in 1964 and the Quadrangular Storehouse in 1978. The Small and Great Basins were also filled with rubble and covered over in the 1970s, along with Nos.1-3 Dry Docks, and to the east the former Garrison area was completely levelled.

A steelworks, established in 1971 on what had been military land to the south of the Dockyard, closed in 2012.

From 1974 to 1994 Olau Line operated a ferry service out of the northern part of the former Dockyard from Sheerness to Flushing. Whilst a linkspan already existing at Sheerness, having been built for the Ostend-Sheerness Freight Ferries service prior to its demise in October 1972, initially, some of the facilities at Sheerness were temporary in nature, and with the Medway Ports Authority being unable to finance the construction of new facilities, these had to be funded by Olau Line themselves, with a permanent passenger terminal being opening in November 1975.

By 1986, it had become apparent that Olau Line's, then 11 year old, terminal building at Sheerness was no longer fit for purpose. HM Customs and Excise deemed that the existing baggage hall was too small and required a new baggage reclaim hall to be built. This was the first phase of development with the new baggage building opening in March 1986 at a cost of £1.7 million. Administration staff were then moved from the terminal building to the refurbished former Pay Office building in September 1987 and a replacement Olau Line passenger terminal was constructed, ready for opening at Easter 1988.

Further to the earlier reconstruction of the baggage hall and passenger terminal, given the larger new ships by then planned for Olau Line, it had become clear that the original ferry berth at Garrison Point, which was only just large enough for the then Olau Hollandia and Olau Britannia, would not be large enough for the new ferries. Plans were duly drawn up by Medway Ports Authority and Olau Line for a £7 million, five acre reclamation scheme, to include a new Swedish-built linkspan. Vehicular access to the new linkspan was achieved by demolished a World War II blockhouse, however the passenger walkway was impeded by the listed Garrison Point Fort. The solution adopted was to run the passenger walkway through multiple gun emplacements within the fort to link to an elevated walkway connected to the ship, when berthed.

In January 1993, new European Community customs rules were brought in which saw the baggage reclaim building, built at the insistence of Customs and Excise in 1986, become redundant. The reduction in customs checks also led to large traffic jams leaving the port.

=== Sheerness Dockyard today ===
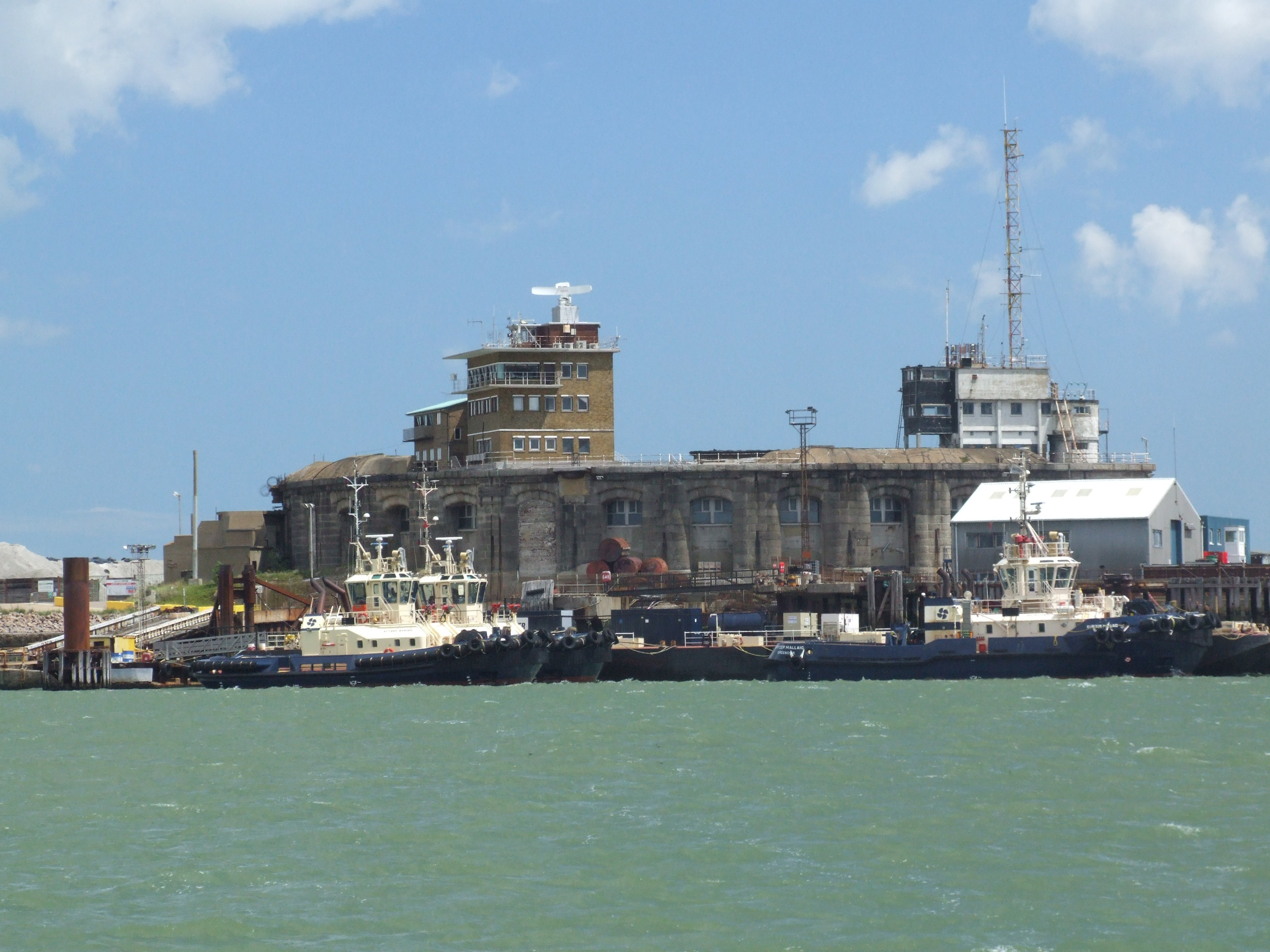
Navigation is controlled from a tower on the old Garrison Point Fort.

The commercial port is currently operated by The Peel Group under the name London Medway. As the local port authority, their Medway Ports division controls navigation on the River Medway from a headquarters in Garrison Point Fort.

== Legacy ==
50 listed structures were destroyed at Sheerness in the 20 years following its closure; but while much of the former Dockyard has been lost, much still remains, and that has received greater recognition and attention in recent years. Historic England describes 'the whole dockyard' as 'a notable feat of marine engineering, with all the masonry carried on piles, represent[ing] the greatest piece of dock engineering by one of the great engineers of the C19'.

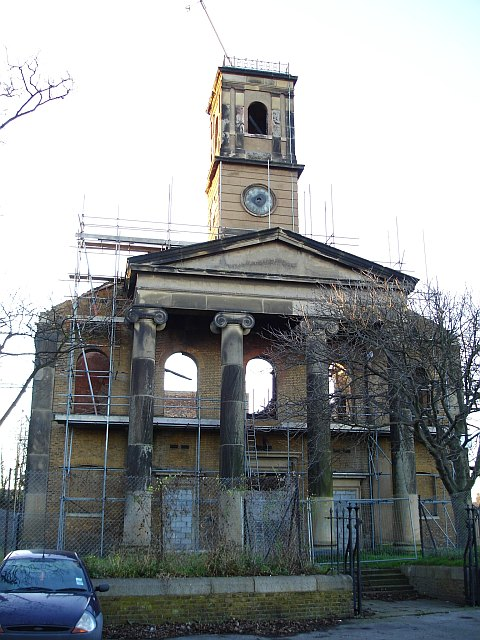
The former Dockyard Church in 2006

A campaign by Save Britain's Heritage saw the former dockyard placed on the World Monuments Fund watch list in 2010, noting that: 'Despite terrible losses, the site still contains a wealth of historic buildings. The problem now is that a majority of these structures stand empty and decaying.'

Much of the former residential quarter of the Dockyard had been sold to a property developer around the turn of the millennium. When planning permission was denied for its redevelopment in 2011, the Spitalfields Trust orchestrated its 'rescue and acquisition'; the area within the perimeter wall that was acquired (in the south-east corner of the former Dockyard) includes six Grade II* and four Grade II listed buildings which are now being restored and refurbished.

In 2013, the trust also acquired the former Dockyard Church, which had been gutted by fire in 2001. A new charity was formed (the Sheerness Dockyard Preservation Trust) with a view to restoring the building and using it, among other things, to put Rennie's 1825 model of the Dockyard on public display. A National Lottery Heritage Fund grant in 2019 enabled the redevelopment by Hugh Broughton Architects to commence. Work got underway in November 2020, with a scheduled opening date of September 2022; only a fraction of the model is to be put on display, however.

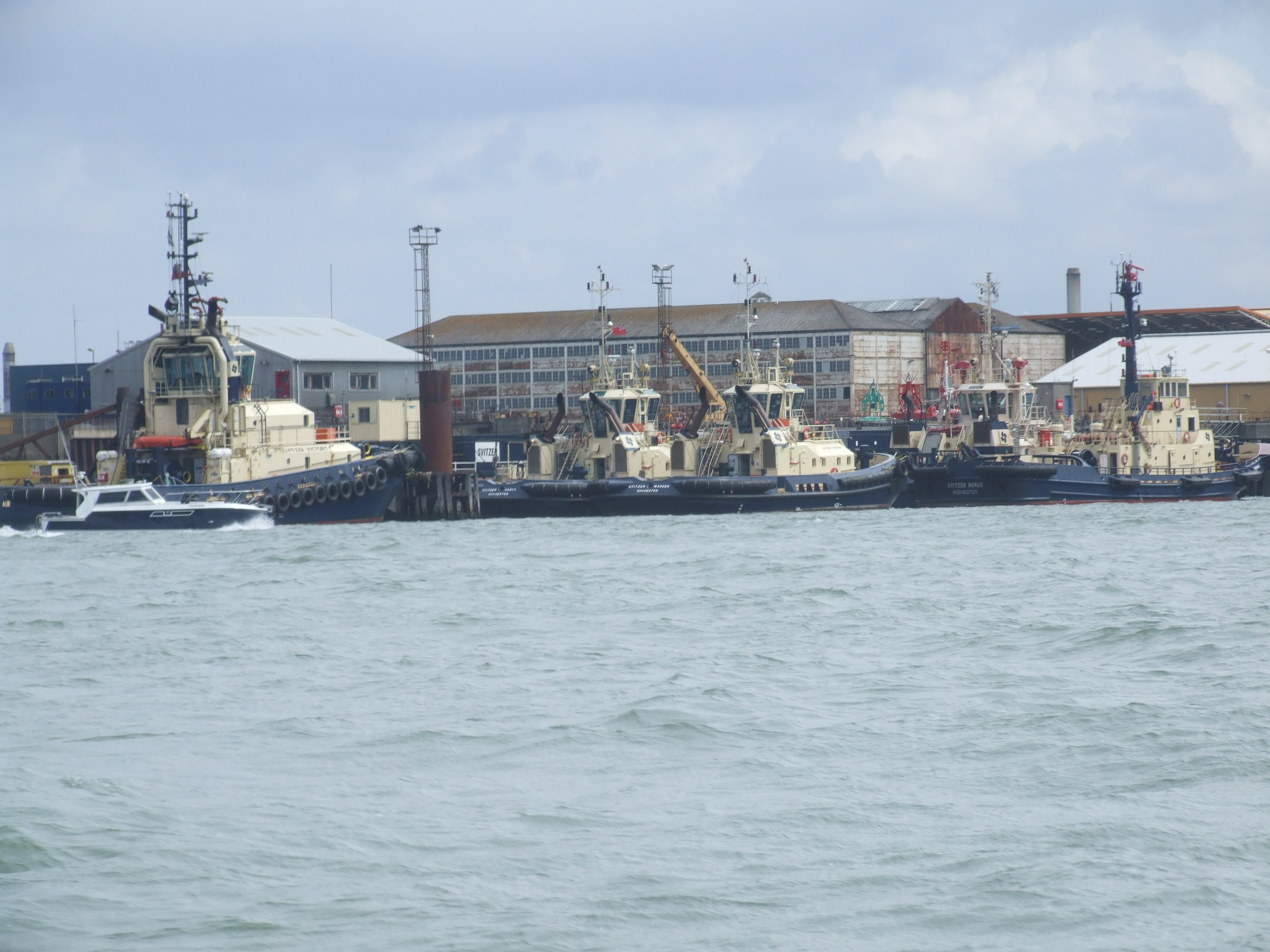
The Grade I listed Boat Store in the heart of the commercial port

Uncertainty remains, however, as to the future of other listed buildings within the former dockyard, above all:

- the Grade I listed Boat Store, described as being 'of international significance in the development of modern architecture' due to its innovatory all-metal rigid frame construction.

In 2015 it was placed by the Victorian Society on its top ten list of endangered buildings and it remains on the nation's Heritage at Risk Register.

Along with the Boat Store a good number of other listed and unlisted buildings and structures survive, several of which are now also judged to have been innovatory in their use of metal as a construction material, for example:

- The Grade II* listed Boat Basin with its docks and slip, including No.4 Dock: thanks to its surviving iron gates 'a uniquely complete example of early C19 dock technology, which Rennie perfected and refined'.
- The Grade II* listed former Working Mast House, its cast iron frame 'part of an important strain in the early C19 development of metal and fire-proof structural systems, devised by Holl... One of the last surviving dock buildings from Rennie's planned dockyard, and one of only two examples of a once-common naval building type'.
- The Grade II* listed Archway Block,'of considerable interest as a fire-proof integrated timber workshop within the elder Rennie's plan for the completely rebuilt yard. Forms a central part of a unique planned early C19 dockyard'.
- The Grade II* listed North Saw Pits building, 'an example of the experimental iron construction developed by Rennie and Holl and pioneered in the dockyards. An important example of a free-standing iron frame, and forming part of a unique early C19 dockyard'.

In 2016 the former Garrison Hospital of 1856, which had been threatened with demolition, was listed for being of special architectural and historic interest. Built on one of the defensive bastions outside the garrison gate, it latterly served as offices for the steelworks and is now owned by Peel Ports.

== Administration of the dockyard ==
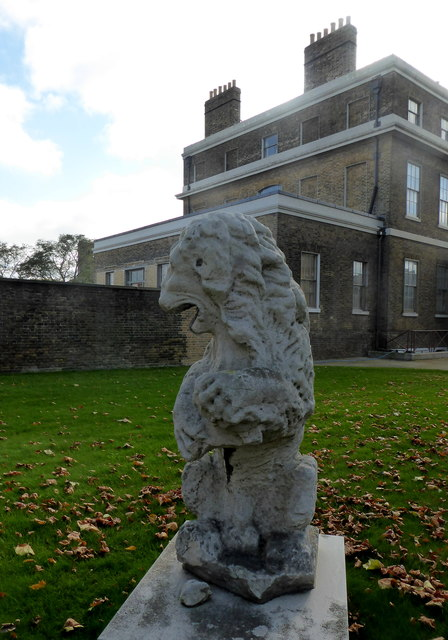
A stone lion from the demolished 17th-century garrison gatehouse sits in front of Dockyard House (built in 1825 to house the Superintendent of the yard).

=== Resident Commissioner, Sheerness Dockyard ===
The Royal Dockyards were overseen by Commissioners of the Navy. Prior to 1795, Sheerness Dockyard was 'under the Inspection of the Commissioner at Chatham'; that year Sheerness was provided with its own Resident Commissioner. Post holders included:

- Captain Harry Harmood May 1795 – August 1796 ('Extra Commissioner of the Navy, resident at Sheerness')
- Captain Francis John Hartwell, September 1796 – June 1799
- Captain Isaac Coffin, June 1799 – April 1804.
- Captain the Hon. George Grey April 1804 – February 1807
- Captain William Brown February 1807 – August 1811
- Captain William Granville Lobb, August 1811 – July 1814
- Captain the Hon. Courtenay Boyle July 1814 – May 1822

=== Captain/Commodore/Admiral superintendents ===
In 1832 the Navy Board was abolished. In place of the Board's Commissioners, the Admiralty appointed Superintendents to oversee the Dockyards. Post holders included:

- Captain Charles Wise: July 1860 – April 1865
- Captain William King-Hall: April 1865 – March 1869
- Captain the Hon. Arthur A.L.P. Cochrane: April 1869 – May 1870
- Captain William G. Luard: May 1870 – January 1875
- Rear-Admiral the Hon. Fitzgerald A.C. Foley: January 1875 – January 1877
- Captain Thomas Brandreth: January 1877 – January 1879
- Captain Theodore M. Jones: January 1879 – January 1883
- Captain John O. Hopkins: January–April 1883
- Captain William Codrington: April 1883 – July 1885
- Captain Henry F. Nicholson: July 1885 – July 1886
- Captain Sir Robert H. More-Molyneux: July 1886 – June 1888
- Captain Charles G. Fane: June 1888 – August 1890
- Captain Richard Duckworth-King: August 1890 – January 1892
- Captain Armand T. Powlett: January 1892 – January 1894
- Captain John Fellowes: January 1894 – January 1895
- Captain John C. Burnell: January 1895 – January 1898
- Captain Andrew K. Bickford: January 1898 – June 1899
- Captain Reginald F.H. Henderson: June 1899 – June 1901
- Captain Gerald C. Langley: June 1901 – August 1902
- Captain Walter H.B. Graham: August 1902 – January 1905
- Captain Frederick L. Campbell: January 1905 – January 1906
- Rear-Admiral James Startin: February 1906 – May 1907
- Captain John Casement: May 1907 – July 1908
- Captain Robert H. Johnston Stewart: July 1908 – December 1909
- Captain Henry H. Torlesse: December 1909 – December 1911
- Rear-Admiral Robert J. Prendergast: December 1911 – September 1915
- Rear-Admiral Edmund Hyde Smith: September 1915 – April 1919
- Captain F. Shirley Litchfield-Speer: April 1919 – March 1922
- Captain Herbert N. Garnett: March 1922 – February 1923
- Captain Oliver Backhouse: February 1923 – February 1925
- Captain Frederick C. Fisher: February 1925 – April 1927
- Captain Dashwood F. Moir: April 1927 – April 1929
- Captain Benjamin W. Barrow: April 1929 – July 1930
- Captain Hugh D. Hamilton: July 1930 – July 1932
- Captain Robert S. MacFarlan: July 1932 – July 1934
- Captain James V.V. Magrane: July 1934 – September 1935
- Captain Henry B. Maltby: September 1935 – December 1937
- Captain Hugh R. Marrack: December 1937 – July 1943
- Rear-Admiral Colin S. Thomson: July 1943 – October 1945
- Commodore Jack T. Borrett: October 1945 – August 1948
- Captain Hubert V.P. McClintock: August 1948 – September 1950
- Captain Villiers N. Surtees: September 1950 – September 1953
- Captain Sydney J.S. Boord: September 1953 – November 1955
- Captain Francis R. Main: November 1955 – October 1957
- Captain Paul M.B. Chavasse: October 1957 – March 1960
