= James Flower =

James Flower or Jim Flower may refer to:

- Sir James Flower, 2nd Baronet (1794–1850), British politician
- Jim Flower (American football) (1895–1956), American football player
- Jim Flower (Royal Navy officer) (1923–2002), British Royal Navy engineer admiral
