= Stanley McArdle =

Royal Navy Rear Admiral (1922–2007)

Rear-Admiral Stanley McArdle CB MVO GM JP
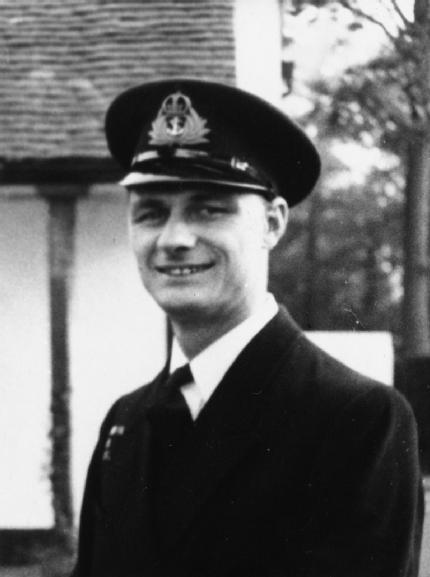
- McArdle c. 1945
- Born: 27 September 1922; Lochmaben, Dumfriesshire, Scotland
- Died: 4 December 2007 (aged 85)
- Military career
- Allegiance: United Kingdom
- Branch: Royal Navy
- Service years: 1938–1980
- Rank: Rear-Admiral
- Nickname: Mack
- Commands: HMS Burghead Bay; HMS Mohawk (1965); HMS Glamorgan (1970)
- Conflicts: Second World War
- Awards: Companion of the Order of the Bath; Member of the Royal Victorian Order; George Medal
- Other work: Director of British Bus and Endless Holdings; Governor of Godolphin School, Salisbury.

Rear-Admiral Stanley Lawrence McArdle, CB, MVO, GM, JP (27 September 1922 – 4 December 2007) was a senior officer in the Royal Navy, and a recipient of the George Medal for his efforts in the rescue of survivors from the ferry MV Princess Victoria during the North Sea flood of 1953.

== Early life ==
McArdle was born in Lochmaben, Dumfriesshire, on 27 September 1922, the son of a colour sergeant in the Royal Marines. He was educated at the Royal Hospital School, Holbrook.

== Navy career ==
McArdle joined HMS St Vincent at Gosport in 1938 as a boy seaman, 2nd class and saw service worldwide as a torpedoman before being the only successful candidate at a fleet board for promotion to officer in Colombo at the end of the Second World War.

In January 1953 he was awarded a George Medal for his part in HMS Contest's rescue of survivors from the ferry MV Princess Victoria.

His ship, the destroyer HMS Contest, was at Rothesay when it picked up a distress signal. The ferry's stern doors had been ripped open by a storm, and water had flooded the car deck. When Contest arrived the ferry had already sunk, but McArdle and Chief Petty Officer Wilfred Warren managed to pluck several survivors to safety.

He trained the naval guard for King George VI's funeral in 1952, for which he was appointed a Member of the Royal Victorian Order.

He served in the Directorate of Naval Operations and Trade at the Admiralty in 1969 and became Director General Personal Services and Training until 1977. His last appointment was as Flag Officer Spithead and Port Admiral Portsmouth, when he was made Companion of the Order of the Bath.
