= Galactic Patrol =

The Galactic Patrol was an intergalactic organization in the Lensman science fiction series written by E. E. Smith. It was also the title of the third book in the series.

== Overview ==
In the Lensman novels, the Galactic Patrol was a combination military force and interstellar law-enforcement agency, charged with the defense and preservation of Civilization. The Lensmen were the elite of the Galactic Patrol, and Lensmen tended to hold the majority of the senior-executive positions in the Patrol, although non-Lensmen personnel were essential to the organization's success, and garnered almost as much respect as their Lens-bearing superiors. The organization had large numbers of non-humans serving in all roles, although many of the leadership positions seem to be occupied by humanity.

== Organization and resources ==
The Patrol had a great deal of political influence in Civilization. In First Lensman, First Lensman Virgil Samms' first Galactic Council was made up entirely of Lensmen, and there was no evidence that the situation had changed in later novels. The Patrol's influence was also present in many other levels of society, to the point where "G-P hours" or "G-P days" were generally considered the standard unit of time, and that they had what amounted to a censorship veto over many prominent news-reporting organizations. Patrol bases dotted the galaxy, ranging from low-grade spaceports to the massive headquarters bases of Prime Base on Earth (or Tellus, as it is called in the novels) and Ultra Prime on Klovia, in the second galaxy, and its possession of the inertialess (or "free") drive made it possible for its forces to deploy anywhere in known space rapidly.

Other forms of faster-than-light travel included Hyper-Tubes, which were man-made wormholes which both the Boskonians and Galactic Patrol frequently used, and N-Space corridors which were gateways to a parallel universe. Both sides of the war frequently used literal planets accelerated to relativistic speeds and "fired" through wormholes as a primary strategic weapon, in effect intergalactic ICBMs. Later the Boskonian Empire began using N-Space corridors as "cannons" that could fire planets or moons at fifteen times the speed of light at a given target and could obliterate suns at intergalactic distances.

This organization was also very well-funded, to the point where even though the tax rate was the lowest in history with a total income tax, in the highest bracket, of only 3.592%, it possessed an expendable reserve of ten billion credits on Tellus alone. In Gray Lensman, Port Admiral Haynes noted that, were it not for the galactic war, a financial crisis might have risen over the Patrol possessing so much in the way of legal tender. (For comparison, in 1940, the year after Gray Lensman was originally published, the U. S. Gross Domestic Product was $97 billion, so the "ten thousand million credit" figure was perceived by readers as equivalent to 10% of GDP; in 2008 terms that would be almost $1.5 trillion.)

Also, the Patrol was well equipped for its second role as military force. In Galactic Patrol it fielded a Grand Fleet of over fifty thousand capital ships, including large numbers of "maulers", or super-heavy battleships. That fleet grew by leaps and bounds through the later novels, numbering well into the millions by Second Stage Lensmen and Children of the Lens. The number of combat units in the Grand Fleet were so numerous that a special flagship, the Directrix or Z9M9Z, had to be commissioned with extensive and advanced C3.

It is explicitly stated in later novels that the Directrix/Z9M9Z is in command of "one-million combat units", which is further elaborated upon as literally one-million individual fleets. The exact number of ships in each fleet is unknown, but the defensive fleet for Directrix alone was eighty ships, and this could reasonably be said to be the number of other fleets—or approximately 80,000,000 ships in total. This also leads to a fair estimation of the size of Civilization, since each fleet was based on an individual member-world of Civilization, indicating about one-million planets in total. This number does not include a fleet of uninhabited planets converted into mobile, armored weapons (also explicitly mentioned) and a huge, planet sized, antimatter WMD called a "Negasphere".

This number is in keeping with the fact that, later in the series, Boskone (the great enemy of Civilization) mustered fleets of warships and mobile worlds of comparable size to be sent through the "hundreds of thousands" of hyperspatial tubes they'd opened to attack Arisia and Earth directly. It is possible then that at that one battle Boskone possessed millions or even tens of millions of ships equal in size and power to super-maulers, thus explaining Civilization's need for such astonishingly vast standing armed forces.

The Patrol's ground forces, while receiving less attention than the fleet, were no slouches either. Perhaps the most visible of the ground combat arm were the Valerian marines, Terran-descended humans whose high-gravity colony world had bred incredible strength and agility into them. The Patrol also possessed extensive ground armor and artillery, including "catapillars", massive vehicles toting heavy beam cannon batteries. The two best-known weapons of the Patrol, however, are probably the DeLameter energy beam handgun, and the space-axe, described as a "combination and sublimation of battle-axe, mace, harpoon, and lumberman's picaroon" and the favored weapon of Valerian marines.

The Patrol's scientists were among the finest in the known universe, capable of quickly creating new forms of weapons. Examples include the detector nullifier, the negasphere (a weapon that behaved like antimatter with negative mass), and the sunbeam (which concentrated a star's entire energy output into a single, horrifyingly powerful beam).

== Leadership ==
The full range of executive leadership positions for the Patrol is less than clear. What is clear is that nearly all these positions were held by Gray Lensmen. Four distinct positions can be discerned:

- Port Admiral, the apparent head of the combat and operating forces. This position had a seat on Civilization's ruling Council, and there was at least one case of the Council President holding both posts simultaneously. Notable Port Admirals include Roderick K. Kinnison, Port Admiral Haynes, and Raoul LaForge. There is also mention of "five-star admirals" in Galactic Patrol, who are apparently the Port Admiral's subordinates and deputies.
- Commandant of Cadets, in charge of the training of Patrol personnel, with specific authority over Tellus's Lensmen candidates. Notable Commandants of Cadets include Lieutenant-Marshal Fritz von Hohendorff.
- Surgeon-Marshal, in charge of medical operations. Notable Surgeon-Marshals include Surgeon-Marshal Lacy.
- Galactic Coordinator, a semi-political post which, in effect, was a military governorship over the second of the two galaxies in which the Patrol operated. The first Galactic Coordinator was Kimball Kinnison, and he had a Vice-Coordinator as his deputy.

The first three positions generally operated from Prime Base on Tellus. By necessity, the Galactic Coordinator was based on Klovia. Other apparent positions include the following: Admiral and Lieutenant-Admiral of the First Galactic Region (the area surrounding the Sol system), Marshal and Lieutenant-Marshal of the Sol system, and General and Lieutenant-General of Tellus. (Notably, these ranks are apparently intended to be in descending order, but draw upon ranks from several different branches of the military service.) These posts were only mentioned in First Lensman, and it is unclear if they are still active as of the events of Galactic Patrol.

== Locations ==
=== Prime Base ===
Prime Base is the tremendous military base that first grew from "The Hill", a man-made, flat-topped, steel sheathed mountain that was the main base of first, the Triplanetary Service, and then of the new Galactic Patrol on Tellus. During the time of the First Lensman when it was still "The Hill", it was attacked by pirates working for Boskone, but thanks to the efforts of its fleet and its own very strong defenses, it survived without coming to any harm. Later in First Lensman Prime Base was moved to New York Space Port. If it remained there is not revealed in First Lensman or in the later books. At the beginning of the third book, Galactic Patrol, it is referred to only as the "Prime Base of Tellus", but its location is not stated.

Prime Base has a large number of functions including housing the office of the Port Admiral, facilities with the ability to construct warships for the Galactic Patrol, and a variety of scientific labs for scientists that work there. It is hinted within the series that, rather than a Military-Industrial Complex such as evolved in our society, almost all military research and production is managed by civilian employees of the Galactic Patrol, rather than by independent contractors. Earth's financial contribution to the Galactic Patrol is paid by a 3.6% income tax "in the highest brackets," distributed across the entire planet, making the financial resources of the Patrol—even in wartime—roughly equivalent to 10% of Earth's GDP; (in 2008 terms that would be almost $1.5 trillion from the Earth alone.)

Internal evidence in the series may lead the modern reader to believe that The Hill/Prime Base is the evolved form of North American Air Defense Command (NORAD) headquarters at the Cheyenne Mountain Complex, Colorado. However, the Cheyenne Mountain Complex, initiated in 1961, postdates the publication of the Lensman novels, and is location in a different region of the US. A passage in Triplanetary says The Hill is in "the heart of the Rockies", just "over the western ranges of the Bitter Roots"

With the discovery of Lundmark's Nebula (the "second Galaxy"), the Galactic Patrol built Ultra Prime base on Klovia - a far stronger version of Prime Base, though it never replaced Prime Base in terms of overall importance.

=== Ultra Prime ===
Ultra-Prime is the immensely well-protected fortress that is the Galactic Patrol's base on Klovia. It was built to be even tougher than Prime Base on Tellus, and has considerably better defenses. Built in the latter stages of the war against Boskone, it was never attacked, but provided the perfect lure with which to draw out the Boskonian Grand Fleet in order to destroy it.
