= Cyril Everard Tower =

Royal Navy Admiral (1861–1929)

Admiral Cyril Everard Tower, DSO (3 December 1861 – 20 January 1929) was a Royal Navy officer.
