= David Bawtree =

Royal Navy Rear Admiral (born 1937)

Rear Admiral David Bawtree CB DL FIEE FIMechE

Civil Emergencies Adviser to the Home Office
- In office 1993–1997

David Kenneth Bawtree (born 1 October 1937) was Civil Emergencies Adviser to the Home Office 1993–1997. He moved on to become the Chairman of Portsmouth Hospitals NHS Trust.

Bawtree joined the Royal Navy. He was promoted to captain on 31 December 1980. As a Weapon Engineering Officer, he was Director Naval Engineering Training 1987–1990, and Flag Officer and Naval Base Commander Portsmouth 1990–1993. He retired from the navy on 20 November 1993. After retirement he was Technical Director of Visor Consultants Limited.

He was appointed a Deputy lieutenant (DL) for Hampshire on 15 January 1997.
