= Neil E. Rankin =

British admiral

Rear Admiral Neil Erskine Rankin, CB, CBE (born December 1940) had a 33-year Royal Naval career, beginning as a pilot, when he was the first Fleet Air Arm pilot to fly the Harrier aircraft, working his way up to be the Commanding Officer of HMS Ark Royal before finishing his naval career as the last Flag Officer Portsmouth (1993–1996).

He also commanded HMS Achilles, HMS Bacchante, HMS Andromeda, the Eighth Frigate Squadron and held tri-service command in the Falkland Islands as a Rear Admiral. He has represented the Royal Navy at rugby, sailing and golf.

In 1996, he was appointed chairman of Caledonian MacBrayne, the Scottish Government-owned ferry company, continuing til 1999.

Neil served as an East Lothian Councillor for a decade and on the board of several schools. He is a trustee of The Royal Yacht Britannia Trust, the Portsmouth Naval Base Property Trust and former chairman of the Scottish Seabird Centre. He is an Honorary Fellow of Scottish Environment LINK.

Scots-born Rear Admiral Rankin CB, CBE, is married with two children.
