= Flag Officer Spithead =

- Navy Department
- Reports to: Commander-in-Chief, Naval Home Command
- Precursor: Flag Officer Portsmouth Area
- Formation: July 1971
- First holder: Rear-Admiral Peter G. La Niece
- Final holder: Rear-Admiral Stanley L. McArdle
- Abolished: August 1975
- Succession: Flag Officer, Portsmouth

The Flag Officer Spithead was a senior Royal Navy appointment first established in July 1971. The office holder was responsible for the command of Spithead and wider Portsmouth area command, that formed a part of Naval Home Command. The appointment continued until August 1975 when it was abolished.

== History ==
The office of the Flag Officer Spithead was a senior Royal Navy appointment first created in July 1971. The office holder was responsible for the command of Spithead and wider Portsmouth area command, that formed a part of Naval Home Command. The appointment continued until August 1975 when it was abolished.

== Office Holders ==
- Rear-Admiral Peter G. La Niece, July 1971 – May 1973
- Rear-Admiral Stanley McArdle, May 1973 – August 1975.
