= Jim Flower (Royal Navy officer) =

Rear-Admiral James Flower, CB (5 July 1923 – 19 December 2002) was a senior marine engineer with the Royal Navy and was later involved in restoration of the propulsion machinery of Isambard Kingdom Brunel's steamship the SS Great Britain.

== Early life and career ==
Jim Flower was educated at Blundell's School in Tiverton before joining the Royal Navy in 1941. He served during the war in the cruiser HMS Norfolk and the battleship HMS Duke of York and from 1948 in the cruiser HMS Liverpool.

Liverpool was followed by a five-year stint on the staff of the Engineer-in-Chief of the Fleet. This led to a first "charge job" in 1955 as the engineer officer of the frigate HMS Whitby, the first ship of the Type 12 anti-submarine frigates (Whitby-class frigates).

Flower was promoted to commander in 1957 and joined the recently formed nuclear propulsion development team under the Rear-Admiral Nuclear Propulsion, where he worked on the development of HMS Dreadnought, Britain's first nuclear submarine. From 1961 Flower spent two years at sea as the engineer officer of a frigate squadron, followed by tours at Cammell Laird's shipbuilders and at the Admiralty. After promotion to captain, he was the Western Fleet's senior engineering staff officer and, from 1970, commanded the nuclear reactor testing and training establishment at Dounreay before spending four years based at the Ministry of Defence in Bath as Deputy Director (Design) for marine engineering with the Director-General (Ships). Perhaps more than any other single person, he was responsible for the success of the "marinised" gas turbine programme, initially based on the Type 14 (Blackwood class) frigate HMS Exmouth which was rebuilt as a gas turbine-driven ship and used as a test-bed to overcome the host of design difficulties that confront aero engines when translated to a hostile shipborne environment.

This programme placed the Royal Navy well ahead of other nations and has been compared in importance to the introduction of the steam turbine. Within a few years, all major Royal Navy new construction, including aircraft carriers, were gas turbine-driven.

Flower was promoted to rear-admiral in 1975 and appointed Flag Officer and Port Admiral at Portsmouth. He returned to Bath for his final two postings as Director of Engineering (Ships) and Director of Post Design. There he was very much to the fore in promoting the interests of Rolls-Royce in Japan, where British experience with overall "marinised" installations, particularly the fuel-efficient Olympus-Tyne combination, produced an edge over the competition. This led to Japan's Maritime Self- Defense Force becoming a better customer than the Royal Navy. Flower was appointed Companion of the Order of the Bath on his retirement in 1980.

== SS Great Britain ==
Flower is particularly remembered for his work in support of the engineering restoration of the SS Great Britain.

== Sources ==
- Obituary of Rear-Admiral James Flower, The Times, 7 January 2003
