= Admiral-superintendent =

Former UK naval appointment

The admiral-superintendent was the Royal Navy officer in command of a larger Naval Dockyard. Portsmouth, Devonport and Chatham all had admiral-superintendents, as did some other dockyards in the United Kingdom and abroad at certain times. The admiral-superintendent usually held the rank of rear-admiral. His deputy was the captain of the dockyard (or captain of the port from 1969).

Some smaller dockyards, such as Sheerness and Pembroke, had a captain-superintendent instead, whose deputy was styled commander of the dockyard. The appointment of a commodore-superintendent was also made from time to time in certain yards.

The appointment of admiral-superintendents (or their junior equivalents) dates from 1832 when the Admiralty took charge of the Royal Dockyards. Prior to this larger dockyards were overseen by a commissioner who represented the Navy Board.

In the Royal Naval Dockyards, admiral-superintendents ceased to be appointed after 15 September 1971, and existing post-holders were renamed port admirals. This followed the appointment of a (civilian) Chief Executive of the Royal Dockyards in September 1969 and the creation of a centralised Royal Dockyards Management Board.

== Admiral-superintendents ==
List of admiral-superintendents by first appointment date. Appointed by the Navy Board until 1832 and the Board of Admiralty thereafter.

- Admiral-Superintendent, Plymouth, 1707–1712, 1832–1966
- Admiral-Superintendent, Chatham, 1879–1951
- Admiral-superintendent, Malta, 1832–1897
- Admiral-superintendent, Portsmouth, 1832–1996
- Admiral-Superintendent, Naval Reserves, 1875–1903
- Admiral-Superintendent, Devonport, 1846–1970
- Admiral-Superintendent, Gibraltar, 1898–1945
- Admiral-Superintendent, Rosyth Dockyard, 1915–1944
- Admiral-Superintendent of Esquimalt Dockyard (Victoria, British Columbia)
- Admiral-Superintendent of Halifax Dockyard
- Admirals-Superintendent on the Clyde

== Commodore-superintendents ==
List of commodore-superintendents by first appointment date. All appointed by the Board of Admiralty.

- Commodore-Superintendent, Halifax, 1759-1905?
- Commodore-Superintendent, Bermuda, 1795-1834?

== Captain-Superintendents ==
List of captain-superintendents by first appointment date. Appointed by the Navy Board until 1832 and the Board of Admiralty thereafter.

- Captain-Superintendent, Sheerness, 1799-1934
- Captain-Superintendent, Pembroke, 1882-1926
- Captain-Superintendent, Haulbowline, 1869-1923
- Captain-Superintendent, Woolwich, 1512-1869
