= Port admiral =

Port admiral is an honorary rank in the United States Navy, and a former appointment in the British Royal Navy.

== Royal Navy ==
In British naval usage, the term 'port admiral' had two distinct (and somewhat contradictory) meanings, one generic, one specific.

=== Generic use ===
Historically, 'port admiral' was used as a generic term for the senior naval officer having authority over all commissioned ships and naval personnel stationed at a particular home base or anchorage. (Those appointed as Flag Officers Commanding or Commanding-in-Chief of a particular area or Fleet often functioned as the local port admiral in this sense.)

By this definition, the port admiral did not have oversight of the local Royal Navy Dockyard (if any); Dockyards (including ships laid up 'in ordinary') were overseen by an independent official: usually a resident Commissioner appointed by the Navy Board (prior to 1832) or an Admiral-superintendent appointed by the Admiralty (1832-1971). The distinction is seen in informal correspondence such as the following, dated 1837: "The Devonport regatta ... was attended by the Port-Admiral, the Admiral-Superintendent of the Dockyard ... and other persons of consideration."

In practice, the offices of port admiral and admiral-superintendent were sometimes combined.

=== Specific use ===
In 1971, the remaining Admirals-Superintendent of HM Dockyards were redesignated as Port Admirals; unlike the above use of the term, this was an official designation. This reflected a consolidation of previously distinct command roles, and coincided with the appointment of civilian Dockyard General Managers to oversee work within the Dockyards across all departments.

=== Current use ===
Today, both uses of the term are obsolete (as far as current naval practice is concerned) as the equivalent appointments are not of flag-officer rank.

== United States Navy ==
Port admiral is an honorary rank in the United States Navy for the senior officer of the ships in a naval dockyard. Examples include Samuel Livingston Breese from 1869 to 1870 in Philadelphia. The port admiral usually has a flagship, examples of which include USS Roanoke for the New York City port admiral from 1865 to 1874.

== Use of the title in science fiction ==
The rank of port admiral appears in several futuristic military organisations in science fiction.

In the Lensman novels, the rank of port admiral appeared as the most senior naval officer of the Galactic Patrol, with de facto supreme command over its forces. Three specific port admirals were mentioned by name: Roderick K. Kinnison, the first port admiral and ancestor of series protagonist Kimball Kinnison; Port Admiral Haynes, who commanded the patrol during Kimball Kinnison's early career and was a mentor and father figure to him; and Raoul Laforge, an academy classmate and friend of Kinnison's who had replaced the retired Haynes by the time of the last novel.

In the Starfire universe, a fleet admiral (five-star admiral) holds the position of port admiral, presiding over The Yard, the Terran Federation's largest and most important naval base and shipyard.

== See also ==
- Captain of the port
